= Literature of Laos =

The people of Laos have a rich literary tradition dating back at least six hundred years, with the oral and storytelling traditions of its peoples dating back much earlier. Lao literature refers to the written productions of Laotian peoples, its émigrés, and to Lao-language works. In Laos today there are over forty-seven recognized ethnic groups, with the Lao Loum comprising the majority group. Lao (part of the Lao-Tai family) is officially recognized as the national language, but owing to the ethnic diversity of the country the literature of Laos can generally be grouped according to four ethnolinguistic families: Lao–Tai (Tai–Kadai); Mon–Khmer (Austroasiatic); Hmong–Mien (Miao–Yao), and Sino-Tibetan (primarily Tibeto-Burman). As an inland crossroads of Southeast Asia the political history of Laos has been complicated by frequent warfare and colonial conquests by European and regional rivals.

== Literature in Lao society ==
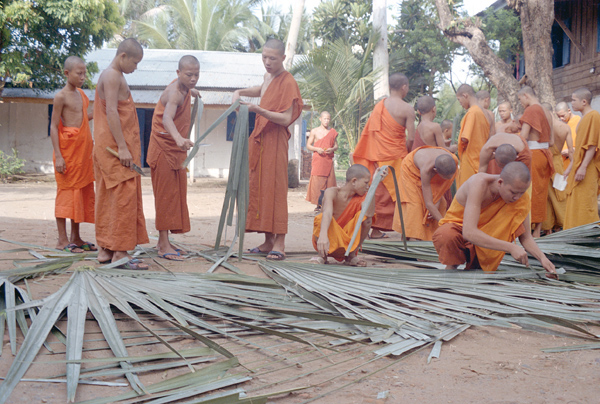
Novice monks practicing the art of making palm-leaf folios at Wat Manolom, Luang Prabang, Laos

Traditionally literature is held high regard in Lao society. Lao literature spans a wide range of genres including religious, philosophy, prose, epic or lyric poetry, histories, traditional law and customs, folklore, astrology, rituals, grammar and lexicography, dramas, romances, comedies, and non-fiction. Lao thematic elements frequently combine the religious and philosophical with secular works and folklore. It is important to appreciate that for the Lao, to engage in study or writing was in essence to pursue a deeper philosophical or religious meaning. Equally important is that oral traditions continue to exist along with written literary forms, and there is difficulty to distinguish the two as separate traditions as they are essentially coexisting and complementary. Written texts, in particular classical or religious, frequently do not have individual authorship nor do they have a fixed form, they are subject to continual retelling, reinterpretation and elaboration.

Most works of Lao literature have been handed down through continuous copying and have survived in the form of palm-leaf manuscripts, which were traditionally stored in wooden caskets and kept in the libraries of Buddhist monasteries. The act of copying a book or text held deep religious significance as a meritorious act. The emphasis in writing was to convey Theravada Buddhist thought, although syncretism with animist beliefs is also common, religious and philosophical teachings. Individual authorship is not important; works were simply attributed with a perceived religious origin raising its status in the eyes of the audience. Owing to the religious and societal importance of most literature, the written word is generally kept in high regard and stored according to specific cultural taboos (i.e. never on the ground, and must be stored in a way that demonstrates respect).

=== Scripts ===
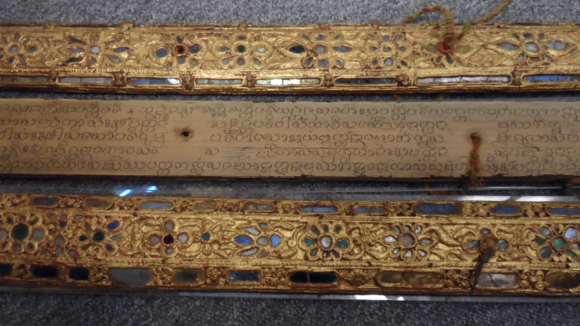
Nineteenth-century Kammavāca palm leaf manuscript from Laos written in Tham Script. The wooden covers are decorated with lacquer, gilt and mirror glass inlay.

Traditionally texts were kept as palm leaf manuscripts (bailan), which were prepared from dried palm leaves which had been cut, incised, covered over with ink or charcoal and subsequently cleaned to reveal the written words. Texts were also recorded using folding books of locally produced paper from mulberry bark paper (saa), khoi paper, or from lacquered cotton although these materials were less durable, and thus tended to be used for non-religious purposes.

Theravada Buddhist religious texts were generally written in Pali, or transcribed into Lao using Tham script. The Tham script shows a strong similarity to the Mon script used in inscriptions in the ancient Mon kingdom of Haripuñjaya (present-day Lamphun Province of Northern Thailand), dating from the 13th century. Versions of the Tham script continue to be used to this day by the Lao, Northern Thai, Tai Lue and Tai Khuen. comprising present-day Laos, the Upper North and Northeast of Thailand, the Northeast of Myanmar, and the Southwest of Yunnan Province in China. In Laos, the Tham script was generally reserved for religious writings, whereas texts which were considered secular were written in Lao Buhan, the precursor of the modern Lao script.

Less common script variants include Tai Dam, and Khom (Ancient Khmer) scripts. Khom script was mainly used for Buddhist texts, works on language, medicine, cosmology, astrology and numerology, protective and astrological formulas (mantra and yantra) in Pali or Sanskrit, based upon the belief that it was a sacred script and special knowledge was required to produce and to use these manuscripts. In the early periods, knowledge of Khom script was originally exclusively attributed to court Brahmin from Angkor. Khmer Brahmin priests were recruited by Lao kings for the purpose of carrying out certain ritual functions at the royal courts.

=== Historical Overview ===
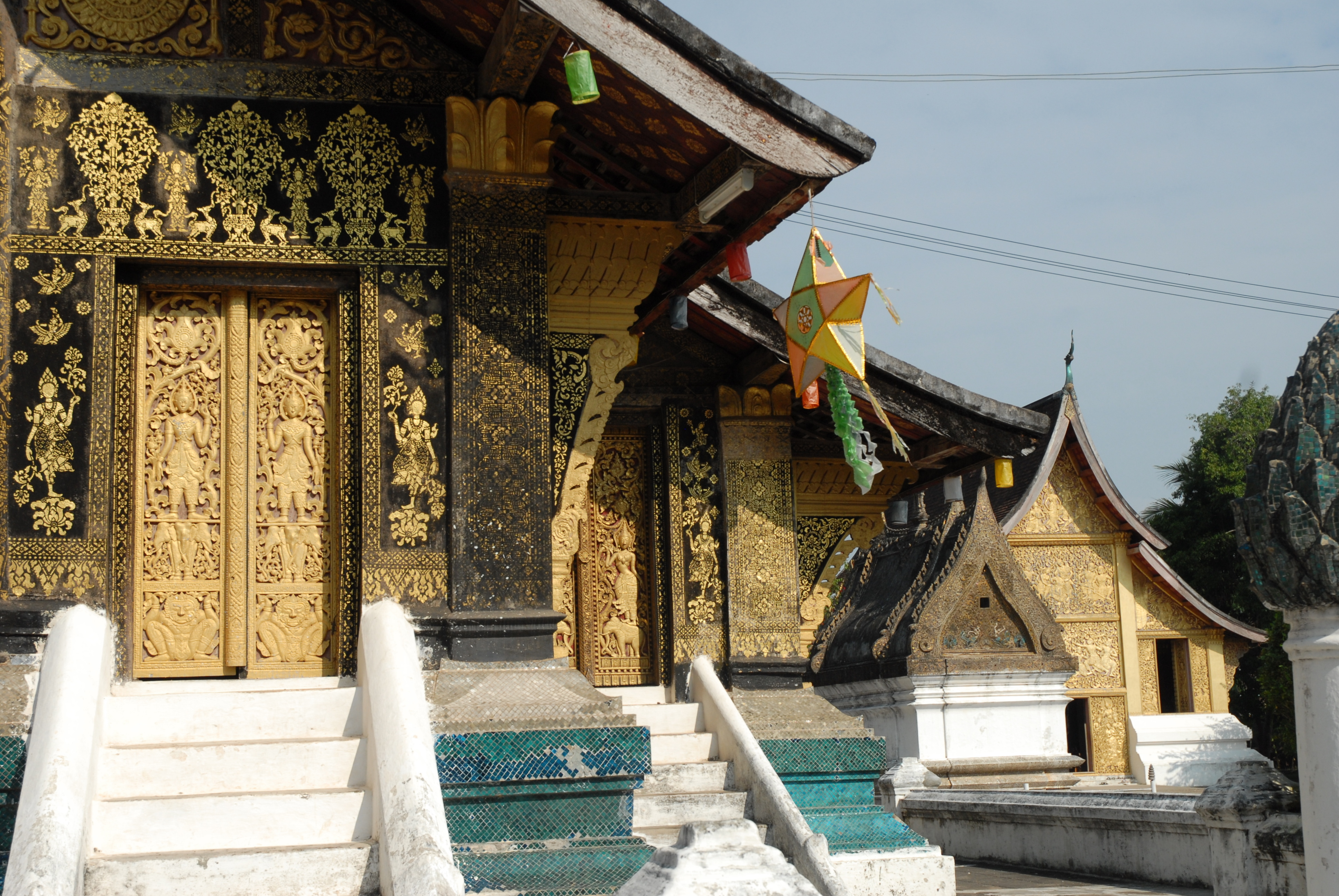
Luang Prabang, Wat Xieng Thong, an ornate Ho or library is in the background.

The Lao trace their linguistic, cultural, and political history to the Kingdom of Lan Xang (1353-1707). Lan Xang had a highly literate society because of the importance of religion and religious education in Lao society. A temple (wat) typically existed in every Lao village and certainly in every town (muang). The Lao sangha had a moral and religious authority on par with the monarchy. All Lao males were expected to spend several years in religious education as a novice or to continue on as a Buddhist monk. Monastic education was the typical route to gain literacy and also some degree of social mobility in traditional society. Royal and religious records were stored in Ho or specifically designed libraries on temple grounds.

From 1707-1713 the Kingdom of Lan Xang had split into the kingdoms of Vientiane, Luang Prabang, and Champassak. By the end of the eighteenth century the Lao kingdoms, had become vassal states to Siam. The cultural impact of Siam was greatest in the Isan region of northeast Thailand, an area which was predominantly Lao in terms of history and ethnicity. By the end of the nineteenth century the French had forced Siam to cede the areas on the east bank of the Mekong River, and had roughly established the borders of modern Laos.

Colonialism during these periods had a lasting impact on Lao society and literature. The traditional model of monastic education was slowly replaced by a secular one which was dominated by Siamese or French culture. The earlier forms of Lao literature were preserved only in the monasteries, and folk culture and tradition remained one of the few remaining links between the Lao and their ethnic heritage.

The twentieth century was period of immense upheaval and conflict, but also a gradual renewal of Lao literature. Both French and Thai nationalist policies aggressively sought to assimilate the Lao during the 1920s-1940s. World War II and the Franco-Thai War had a profound impact on everyday life for the Lao, which gave way to independence movements and the emergence of communism. Politics split Lao society and Lao literature, while the Royal Lao Government struggled to establish itself from 1954-1975.

Independence and secular education helped to create a nationalist identity for the Lao, and interest in traditional Lao history and culture slowly reemerged. Revolutionaries in Laos and Vietnam during the early 1950s began to spread communist ideology, which culminated in the Vietnam War era and the ousting of the Lao monarchy in 1975. During this period Laos became the most heavily bombed country in world history.

Politics continued to dominate literature in the 1980s, with the communist Pathet Lao struggling to assert their control over Laos. Today Laos has a reawakening interest in literature, as people struggle with national identity, rapid technological and social changes, development and a lagging economy, while maintaining a strong popular interest in the folk culture which has been part of their cultural heritage for millennia.

== Classical literature ==
The Lao period of classical literature began during the Lan Xang era, and flourished during the early sixteenth century. The primary cultural influence on Lan Xang during this period was the closely related Tai Yuan Kingdom of Lanna. By the second resurgence of Lao classical literature in the seventeenth century, the Lao had developed a sophisticated tradition of art, literature and scholarship. Subjects were primarily religious or historical in nature, but also included epic poems, law, customs, astrology, numerology, as well as traditional medicine and healing. Many of the works during this period have been lost due to wars in the eighteenth, nineteenth, and twentieth century.

=== The epic poem of Sin Xay ===
The epic of Sin Xay was composed by the Lao poet Pang Kham during the reign of King Sourigna Vongsa and is regarded as the seminal work of Lao epic poetry. The central message is one that unchecked desires will inevitably lead to suffering.

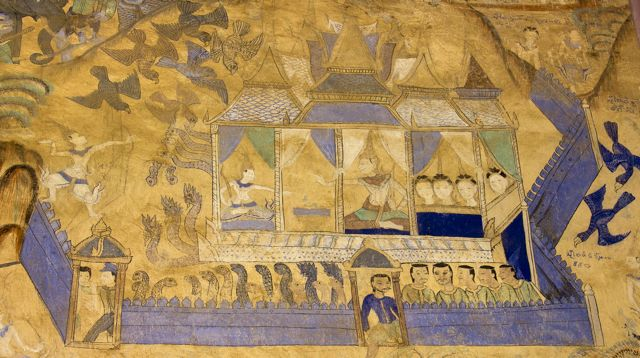
A mural of San Sin Xay epic from Wat Chaisi in Isan, Thailand.

The plot follows the exploits of a king and his family, whose sister was kidnapped by a flying multi-headed nyak (mythological giant) during his youth. The king is so distraught he renounces the throne, and becomes a wandering monk to find his sister. As a wandering monk the king makes his way to a city where he sees seven daughters of wealthy merchant and falls in love. He returns to the kingdom and ceases being a monk to wed all seven of the girls. Six of the queens bear six sons. Through divine intervention the first queen gives birth to an elephant with giant golden tusks, and the youngest gives birth to twins- a golden snail, and boy born clutching a bow, who they name Sin Xay.

The king feared the omen of the births, and consulted the court astrologer, who secretly plotted with other six queens, and suggested that the snail, elephant, and boy together with the two queens who bore them be exiled. The Lord of Heaven (Phaya Thaen) at this point in the epic saves the divine children and the queens by constructing a castle in the sky for them to live. The astrologer is made to raise the remaining six princes, who are neither very smart nor very diligent.

When the princes come of age the king sends them out to find his sister who had long ago been kidnapped. Through the princes aimless wanderings they come to find Sin Xay- whom they trick into thinking will be welcomed back by the king if he joins them in their quest. The group endures many adventures, finally coming to the City of the Nyak among the clouds, where they find the king's sister. They fight a terrible battle where Sin Xay slays the flying multi-headed nyak.

Having achieved their quest, group sets out to return but stops to cleanse themselves and make offerings to the Lord of Heaven. The six brothers, not wanting to lose face in the eyes of their father push Sin Xay, the golden-tusked elephant and snail off a cliff and tell the king's sister that they had tragically drowned. The king’s sister did not believe the princes, but waited to tell the king directly.

On seeing his long lost sister and hearing from her that the princes had killed their brothers, the king becomes enraged and banishes them all, the astrologer, and his six remaining queens. Sin Xay, who did not die in the fall, but was saved by his elephant and snail brothers, returns to see his father. The king is overjoyed to see his faithful son, and crowns him king.

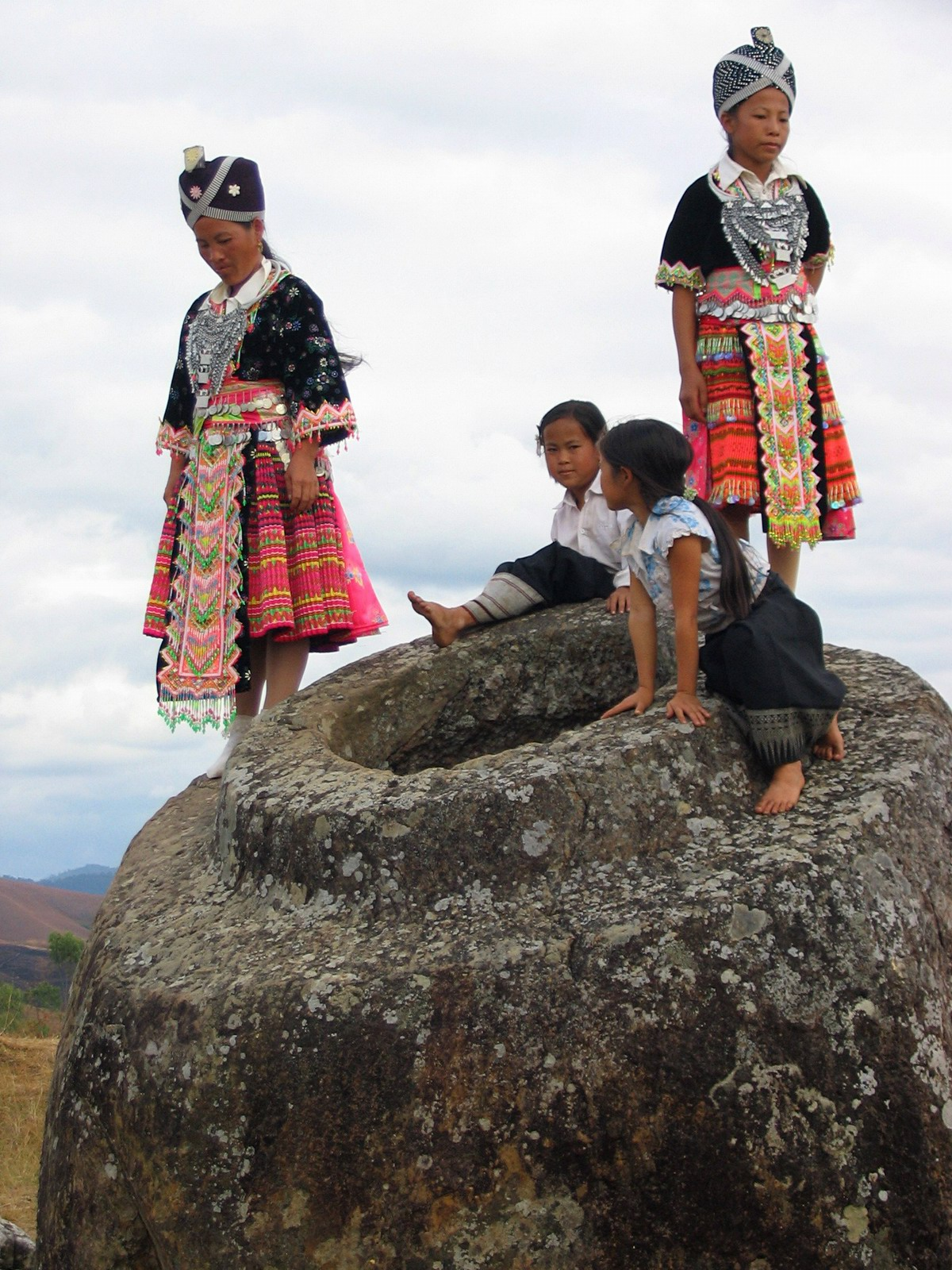
Hmong girls at the Plain of Jars, Xieng Khouang Province, Laos

=== The epic poem of Thao Hung Thao Cheuang ===
The Thao Hung Thao Cheuang epic is regarded by literary critics and historians as one of the most important indigenous epic poems in Southeast Asia and a Lao language literary masterpiece for artistic, historical, and cultural reasons. Both the single extant copy of the text and the oral history originated in Xieng Khouang in Laos, among the Khmu peoples, which were indigenous to Laos prior to the Tai migrations. The oral tradition of the folktale recalls the struggle between the Khmu and indigenous peoples of Laos and the Tai-Lao.

During the fifteenth century, under the Lan Xang era, the story was written and adapted by royal scribes so that the version recalled the struggle of the Lao against the Dai Viet during the 10th and 12th centuries. The plot follows the exploits of a conquering hero Thao Hung, who even in death goes on to lead a ghost army in the afterlife. One scene of the epic describes the creation of the Plain of Jars as part of a massive victory feast. The composition resulted in three patterns of Lao verses in 20,000 lines, making it one of the longest Lao epics.

Despite the changes, major thematic elements and wording remained consistent, so the epic is one of the only descriptions of life in Southeast Asia among indigenous peoples during the Tai migrations. Both the written form and oral traditions are uniquely Lao and show the complex relationship between the major ethnic groups of the Lao Loum, Lao Theung and Lao Sung. The historical and cultural value continues in the description of the way of life among Lao peoples prior to the introduction of Theravada Buddhism.

=== Phra Lak Phra Lam – the Lao version of the Ramayana ===
The Phra Lak Phra Lam is the official national epic of Laos and retells the Lao version of the Ramayana. Phra Lak Phra Lam is named after two principal characters, the brothers Phra Lak, or Lakshaman, and Phra Lam, or Rama. The emphasis of the story is on selflessness and brotherly love in the Lao version, making it traditionally classified among the Jataka tales although the story also had great significance in the royal court as a dance-drama.

During the festivals of Pii Mai (Lao New Year) scenes from the work would be recreated, read aloud, or used in religious sermons. The Lao version is set along the Mekong River and includes Lao characters such as the king of the nāga, and scenes which involve buffalo sacrifice which is associated with the satsana phi (animist religions) in Laos. The story is part shows the influence of India in Lao culture, and more broadly throughout Southeast Asia. Variations of the Ramayana story are common in Southeast Asia, and can be found as the Reamker in Cambodia or the Ramakien in Thailand.

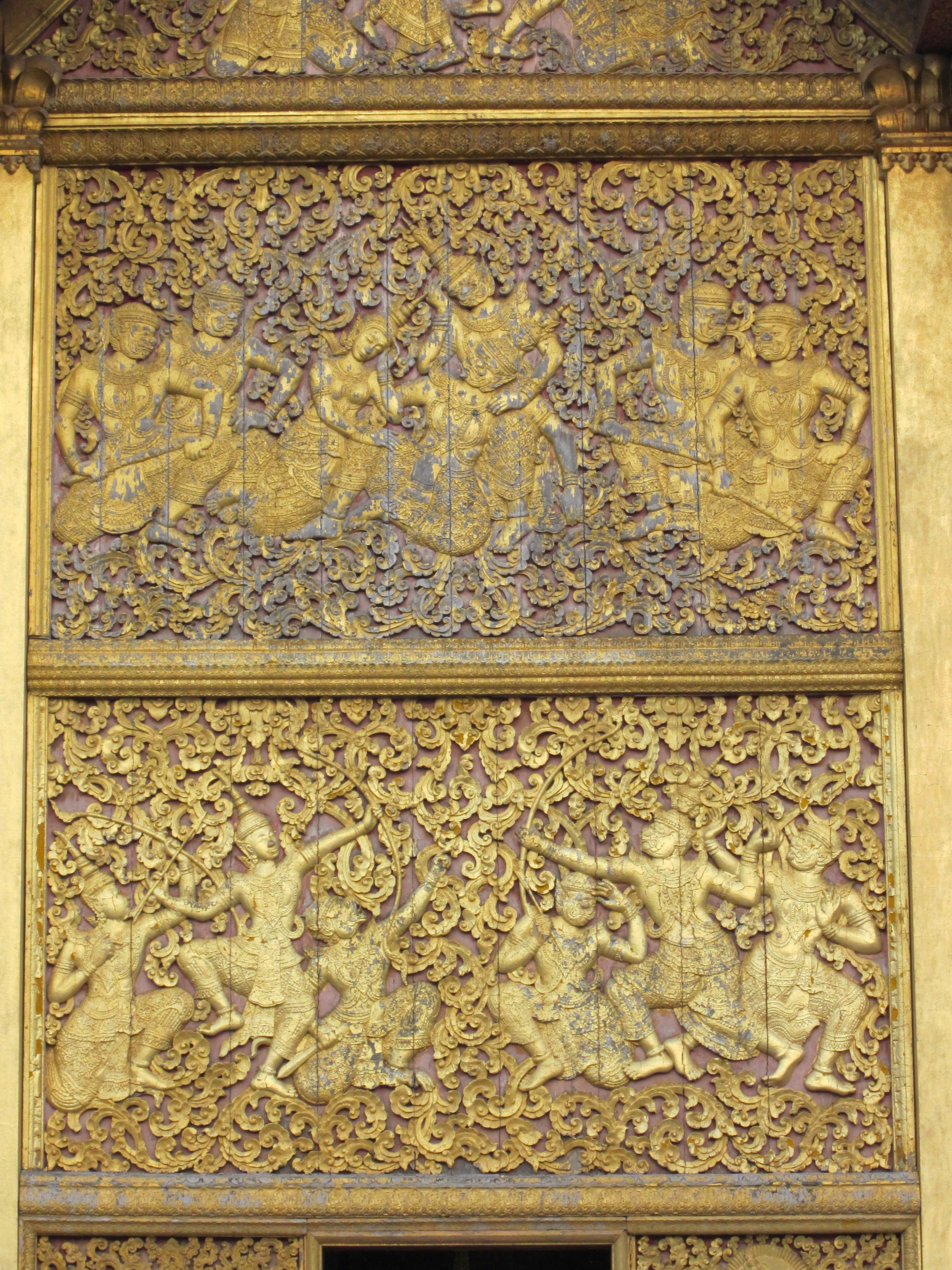
Luang Prabang, Wat Xieng Thong, Gilded bas relief figures from the Phra Lak Phra Lam

=== The Rocket Festival Epics ===
The tale of the Toad King (Phya Khankhaak) and the nithan or love poem Phadaeng Nang Ai are extremely popular literary works and are read or sung as part of the Rocket Festival (Boun Bang Fai; Lao: ບຸນບັ້ງໄຟ,) celebrations each year. The festival has roots as a fertility celebration, and is held at the beginnings of the monsoon season each year.

The epic of the Toad King, tells the story of a prince born to a king in the form of a golden toad. The king cares for the prince, but the prince wishes for a wife as he grows older. The toad prince prays to the Lord of Heaven (Phaya Thaen), who grants the prince everything he wishes for and allows him to shed his toad-like appearance to become a handsome prince.

The prince finds a beautiful wife and his father happily allows his son to become king. The Toad King and his wife are so beloved that everyone and everything under heaven comes to pay him homage, and forget to honor the Lord of Heaven. The Lord of Heaven is so humiliated he forbids the nāga to make rain, which causes drought, terrible fires and suffering on Earth. After seven years of suffering the people, and creatures of Earth and even the divine creatures of heaven cannot take anymore trouble, and come to the Toad King for help.

The Toad King builds a bridge to heaven and fights a terrible battle with the Lord of Heaven. The Toad King wins, and teaches the Lord of Heaven the value of humility. As a result, each year the Lord of Heaven sends down rains, but just in case he forgets the people hold festivals and shoot rockets into the air to bring the rains and remind the Lord of Heaven of his promise.

The Phadaeng Nang Ai poem is a love story that takes place across multiple reincarnations. The title heroine Nang Aikham was born to a powerful Khmer king, her beauty was so great it was renowned even among the nāga. King Phadaeng, in a neighboring kingdom came to see her and seek her hand in marriage. The two fell quickly in love. The Khmer King ordered a rocket festival (Boun Bang Fai), where the winner would be the one to shoot their rocket the highest.

As a reward they would win his daughter’s hand in marriage. King Phadaeng built a rocket but it exploded on the launcher, he left humiliated, and the Khmer King sent the contestants away without promising his daughter to anyone. When the nāga came to bring the rain after the rocket festival, the nāga prince Phangkhi fell madly in love with Nang Aikham. Prince Phangkhi had been Nang Aikham’s soul mate in past lives. Prince Phangkhi transformed himself into a white squirrel to slip past her father’s guards and visit Nang Aikham.

Prince Phangkhi was shot by a poisoned arrow, while transformed as a squirrel and with his dying breath laid a curse on his meat. The meat from his dead body multiplied and was served to the entire Khmer court. The court was all poisoned except Nang Aikham. King Phadaeng charged in to rescue her on a white horse. The nāga king, seeking revenge on the Khmer for killing his son sent a massive nāga army to destroy the Khmer.

The nāga king pursued King Phadaeng and Nang Aikham in a chase that went on for days. Eventually he caught up when Nang Aikham stopped to drink water from a stream, where the nāga king was able to drag through the water to the Nāga City. King Phadaeng looked for her till the day he died. In death, he became a ghost king and made constant war with the nāga. Finally the Lord of Heaven (Phaya Thaen) had to separate Nang Aikham from her two lovers; there they wait between rebirths for the second coming of the Buddha, who will make the final judgment of who she should be with for eternity.

== Historical legends and chronicles ==
History was related using san (poetry) which was intended to be sung or performed, and phongsavadan (chronicles) which were meant to be read aloud during festivals and important occasions.

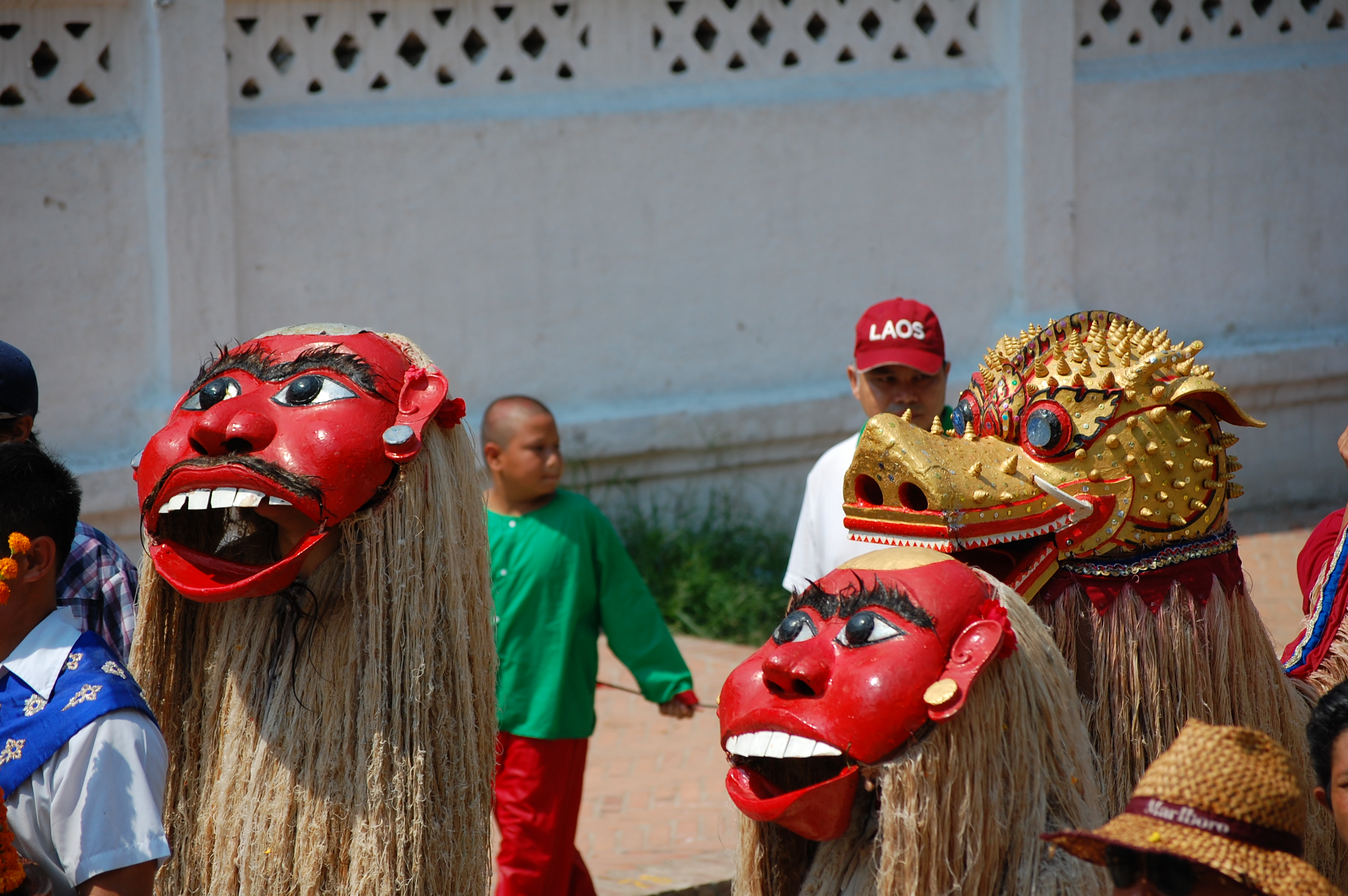
Luang Prabang, Lao New Year, Spirit masks of Pu Nyoe and Ya Nyoe.

=== Origin legends ===
The Lao frequently wrote origin legends (nithan a-thi bay hed) for the people, places, and cultural relics which were part of their society. The Nithan Khun Borom (Story of Khun Borom) is one of the most important origin legends and describes the origin of the peoples in Laos and the surrounding regions from a common gourd. The Nithan Khun Lo expands where the Khun Borom story ends to describe the relationship between the early Lao and the Lord of Heaven (Phaya Thaen) and how the first kings were sent among men to rule the surrounding regions.

Within the tale, mankind was threatened with destruction by giant creeping ivy, and was saved only through the sacrifice of a common elderly couple who volunteered to destroy the ivy and was crushed to death in the process. The story is recalled during the annual Pii Mai (New Year) celebrations by red-faced masked figures representing the spirits of the couple (Pu Nyoe and Ya Nyoe).

Other origin legends describe the founding of major cities in Lan Xang, such as Vientiane, Luang Prabang, Xieng Khouang, and Sikhottabong. Important religious sites such as Phu Si in Luang Prabang and Wat Phu in Champassak were also recorded. Major statues of the Buddha, which included the Phra Kaew (Emerald Buddha), Phra Bang (namesake of Luang Prabang), Phra Sae Kham, and Phra Luk (Champassak) all had written accounts for their creation or discovery and transfer to Lan Xang. The Buddha images were symbols of royal and religious authority, and their stories combined folklore with animist traditions to become powerful palladiums of the monarchy and kingdoms of Lan Xang and Laos.

=== Chronicles ===
The royal court chronicles (phongsavadan) and more general historical accounts (phuen sueb) of Laos come in many versions, yet few of these primary sources have survived due to wars throughout the history of Laos and the earlier Kingdom of Lan Xang. Each of the major cities (muang) Vientiane, Luang Prabang, Xiengkhouang, Champassak maintained various versions of the court chronicles of Lan Xang. During the eighteenth century when these muang became the kingdoms of Vientiane, Luang Prabang and Champassak, and the Principality of Xieng Khouang, the chronicles became more regional in nature.

In 1779 under King Taksin the Great and again following the rebellion of King Anouvong in 1828, the Lan Xang capital city of Vientiane was razed and many of the most important royal chronicles were destroyed or carried to Bangkok along with the Phra Kaew (Emerald Buddha) and other cultural treasures. The population in and around Vientiane was relocated to the west bank of the Mekong in the area of the Khorat Plateau.

The Isan region, although historically within the Lan Xang mandala, was more accessible for the growing power of a nationalist Siam where the population could be taxed or brought into the corvee system of labor. The Lao kingdoms maintained their monarchy and sangha but became vassal states within Siam. The French establishment of Laos in 1893 as part of Indochina would create a political division with the Isan region, although the majority population was historically and ethnically Lao.

Today the Isan region remains part of Thailand, and has developed a distinctly different historical identity which has been the result Thai policies which began during the 1930s and sought to assimilate these people within the dominant culture of the central Thai. During the Vietnam War, and the period of the Khmer Rouge, the influx of Lao and Khmer refugees to the Isan region revived cross cultural communications. The importance of this history to Lao literature and culture is that Thailand is now home to an estimated 30 million Lao speakers, while Laos has an approximate total population of 6 million.

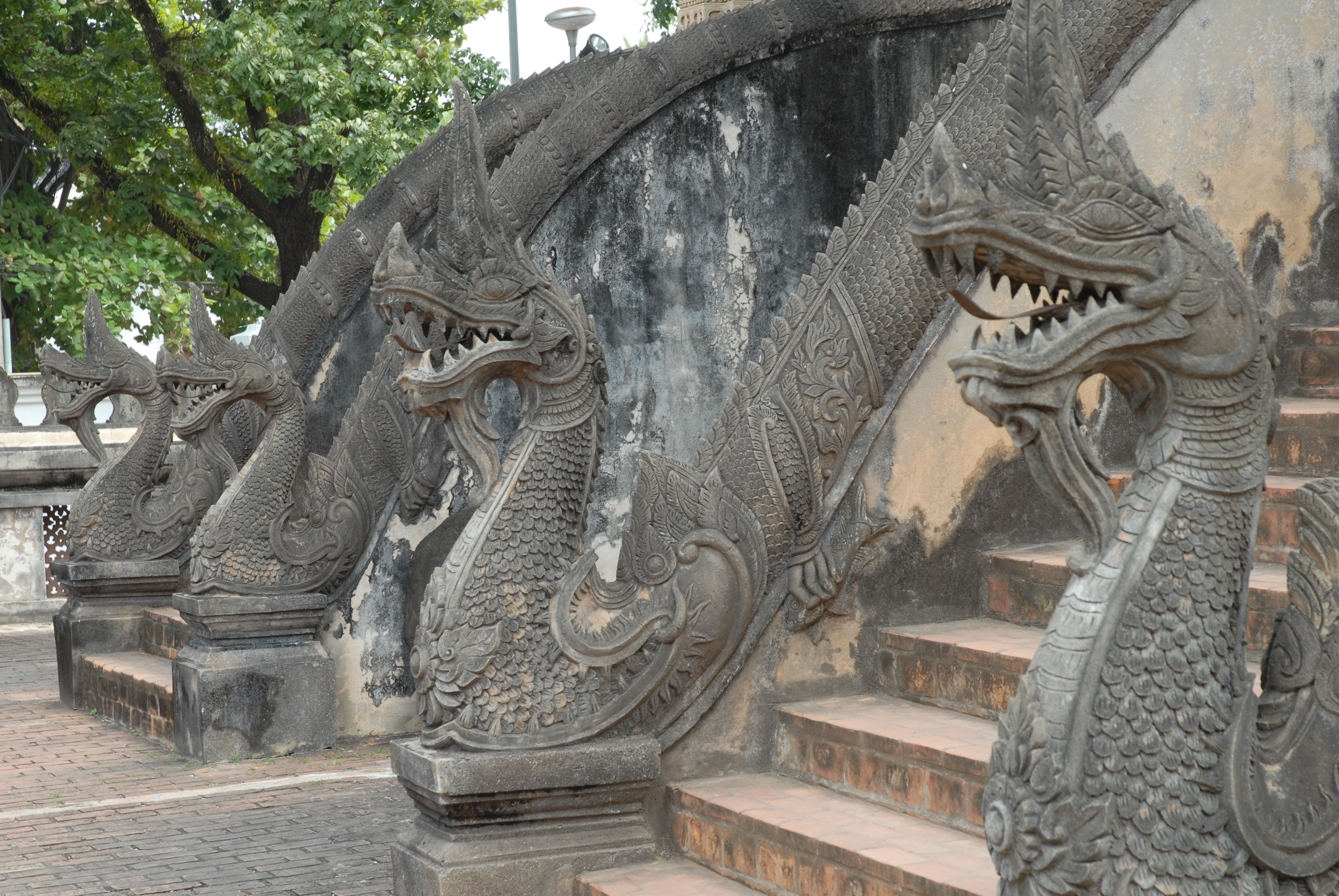
Lao Naga outside the Haw Phra Kaew, Vientiane.

=== Leup Pha Sun and other secret histories ===
The dominance of Siam during the nineteenth century left the Lao unable to remain politically independent, and the infighting among the kingdoms of Vientiane, Luang Prabang and Champassak was bitterly resented among the common people. In 1828, King Anouvong of Vientiane, together with his son the king of Champassak rebelled against Siam in what became known as the Anouvong Rebellion (1828). The end results of the rebellion were disastrous for the Lao, and resulted in the total destruction of Vientiane and more forced population transfers to the Isan.

The willingness to challenge Siamese hegemony created the first stirrings of Lao nationalism, and presented a folk hero identity to the Lao who would not compromise to outside pressures. In one of the most enigmatic and controversial Lao epics, the Leup Pha Sun expresses the author's sadness that he cannot speak freely of his country while he tries to cope with tumultuous relationship between Lan Xang and Siam using both romantic and religious language and imagery. The unnamed author In the end prays for a divine intervention to end the widespread suffering. Similarly, the Pheun Raxavong and Pheun Viang are first hand Lao histories of the Anouvong Rebellion.

Other histories were put into the classical form of epic poetry including the Kab Phagna Siengsa, which retold the history of King Anouvong from the perspective of his top commanders. These secret histories and poetry circulated among the ethnic Lao in Isan and in Laos, keeping the cultural memory of the rebellion in the popular memory. In 2010 a statue of King Anouvong was erected in Laos, a tangible symbol that the cultural memories of the rebellion still carried symbolic importance in the modern era.

== Religious literature ==
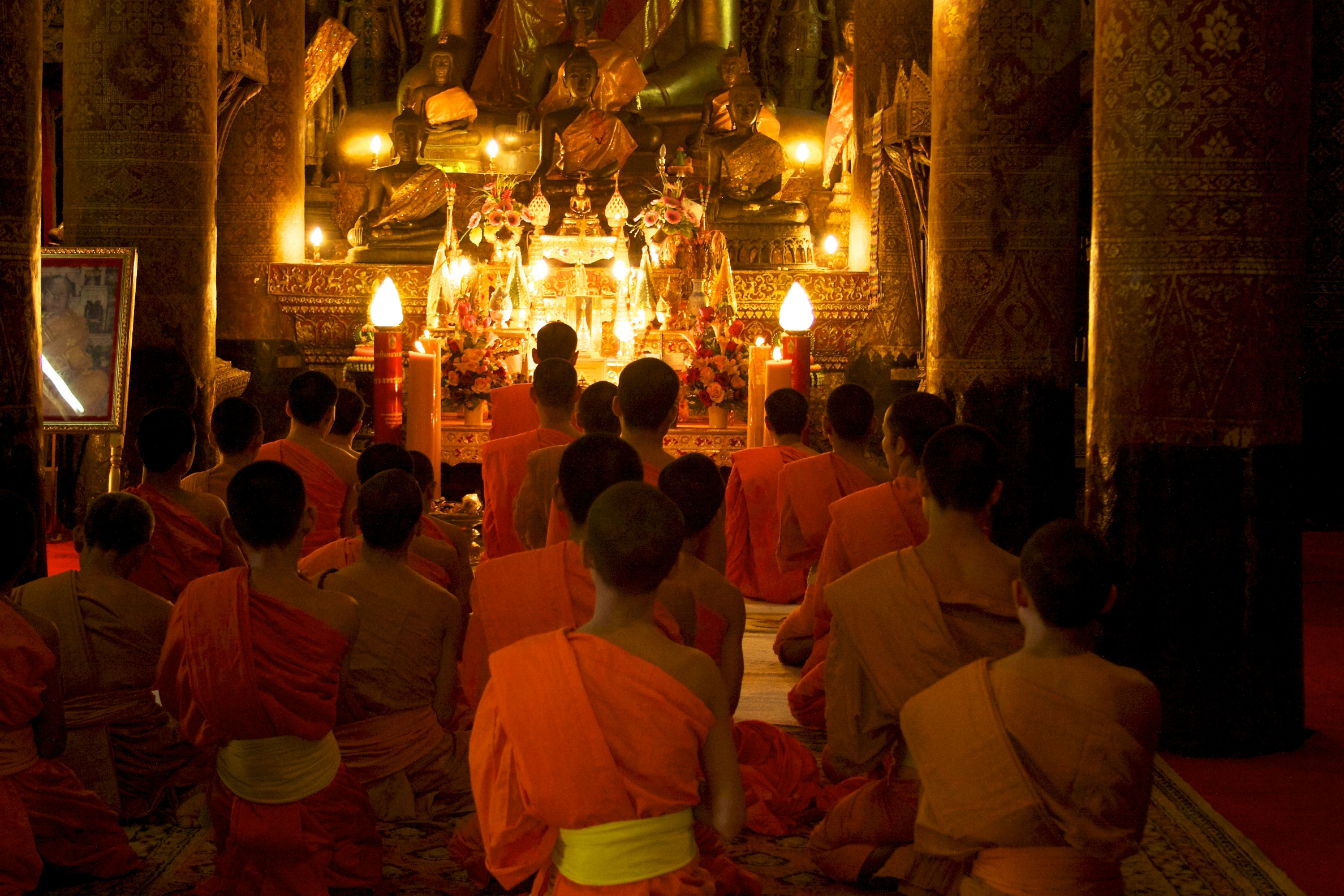
Monks at evening prayer Wat Xieng Thong, Luang Prabang

Religion and religious teaching is a recurring theme for much of Lao literature throughout its history. Laos is predominantly Theravada Buddhist, which was the state religion in the Kingdom of Lan Xang since the time of King Photisarath in the 1520s. King Fa Ngum the founder of Lan Xang brought Theravada monks and the Phra Bang (palladium of Laos) with him when he established Lan Xang in 1353, according to folk traditions. The principle religious texts of Theravada Buddhism are known as the Tipitaka (Three Baskets) which include:

1. Vinaya Pitaka ("Discipline Basket"), dealing with rules for monks and nuns
2. Sutta Pitaka (Sutra/Sayings Basket), discourses, mostly ascribed to the Buddha and disciples
3. Abhidhamma Pitaka, variously described as philosophy, psychology, metaphysics, etc.

The texts, collectively known as the Pali Canon, are written in Pali and were a traditional merit making gift among the kings and sanghas of Southeast Asia. The earliest record of a complete copy of the Tipitaka in Laos was such a gift from the Kingdom of Lanna to King Vixun in the 16th century.

Monastic education has been central to Lao society from the Lan Xang period to the modern day. The oldest monastic school in Laos was founded by King Vixun in 1503. Throughout the areas of what are today southeast Myanmar, the Xipsongpanna in China, north and northeast Thailand, northwest Vietnam, and Laos it was common for monks, texts and even complete libraries to move between monasteries. Kingship in Laos, and Southeast Asia generally, was reinforced and legitimized by sponsorship of the sangha and acts of religious merit. In return, the most prolific teachers with royal sponsorship attracted wealthy patrons, artists, and pilgrims.

As a result of itinerant monks, Buddhist texts in Laos vary greatly between monasteries, with an emphasis for those texts used most frequently in daily community life, rather than complete or formal copies of the Pali Canon. Generally, the most popular texts include blessings used in ritual ceremonies (animasa); blessings used for protection (paritta); instructions used for lay or religious ceremonies (xalong); non-canonical stories from the life of the Buddha (jataka); commentary on Tipitaka (atthakatha); ritual rules or instructions for monks and nuns (kammavaca and vinaya pitaka); local epics and legends (e.g. Xiang Miang, Sin Xay, and Thao Hung Thao Cheuang); summary treatises on Theravadist doctrine (Visuddhimagga and Mangaladipani); grammar handbooks (excerpts from the Padarūpasiddhi and Kaccāyanavyākarana); and relic, image and temple histories (tamnan).

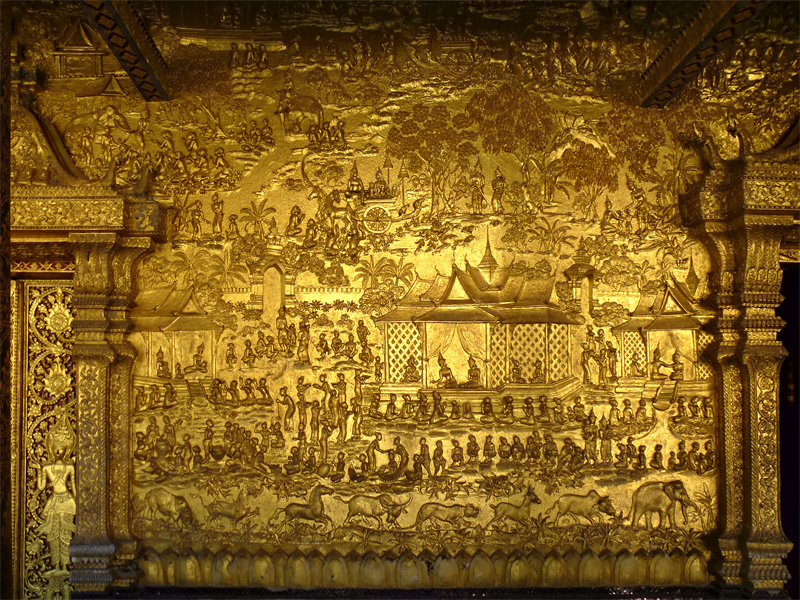
Luang Prabang, Wat Mai, Scenes from the Prince Vessantara Jataka.

=== Jataka tale of Prince Vessantara ===
Jataka tales are morality stories which recall previous incarnations of the Buddha before he was able to reach enlightenment. The stories are used to exemplify a particular virtue or teach a specific lesson, in which the character representing the Buddha may be either human or animal.

In Theravada Buddhism, the Jatakas are a textual division of the Pali Canon, included in the Khuddaka Nikaya of the Sutta Pitaka. The term Jataka may also refer to a traditional commentary on this book. Jataka tales are common throughout Southeast Asia and there can often be found with many regional variations. Laos has developed a number of Jataka tales which are uniquely Lao in their tradition.

The Lao written version of the Vessantara Jataka is generally considered one of the greatest masterpieces of Lao literature. The story recalls the past life of a compassionate prince, Vessantara, who gives away everything he owns, including his children, thereby displaying the virtue of perfect charity. The story is incorporated into Lao celebrations of the festival Boun Phra Vet (Festival of Prince Vessantara) where the story is read aloud and is usually accompanied with dance, drama and mor lam (Lao folk singing).

== Folklore ==
Folklore is among the most diverse, and expressive form of literature in Laos. The category can apply to almost any narrative form of expression, and includes many myths, customs, popular beliefs, riddles, jokes, and common depictions of everyday life. Most Lao folklore is pre-classical and mostly comes from oral traditions. Lao folk singing or mor lam is one of the most popular and widely used methods to preserve folk heritage. Another widely used method is in the various motifs found in weaving. All ethnic groups in Laos practice weaving at some level and it forms an important method of story telling and identity through folk art.

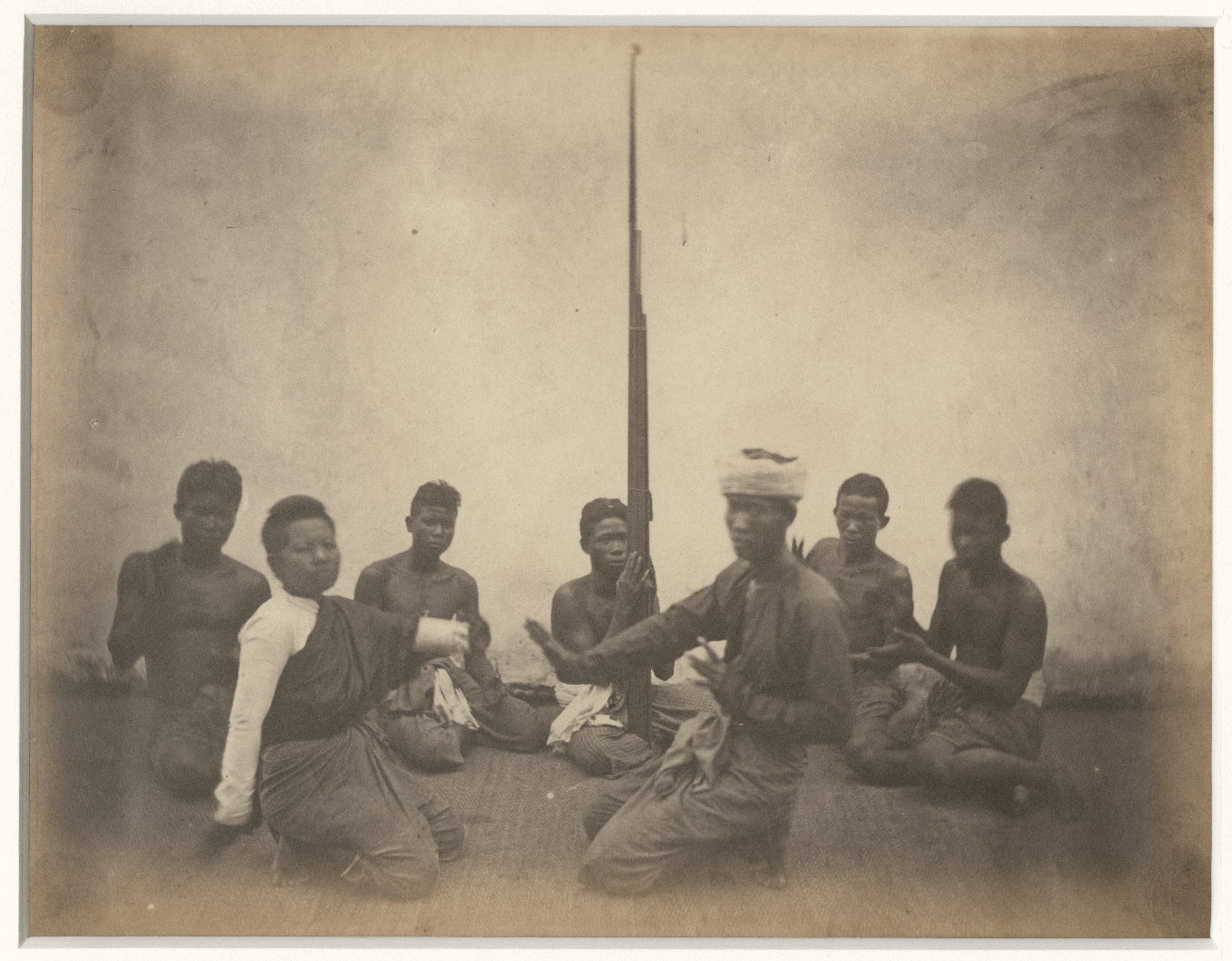
Lao Mor Lam folk singing.

=== Spirit stories ===
Animism is the most widely practiced spiritual practice in Laos behind Theravada Buddhism. Collectively known as Satsana Phi the religion preserves pre-Buddhist, indigenous, and tribal spiritual practices. Although there is no central hierarchy or authority, the practices do form a cultural link between the Lao Loum, Lao Theung and Lao Sung throughout history.

Phi, or spirits, are believed to inhabit buildings, territories, natural places and things, and phenomena. Phi commonly includes ancestral spirits and protection spirits, which are popular in shamanism and traditional medicine. Oral and written traditions also include entertaining stories of malevolent ghosts, such as Grandmother Vom (Phi Ya Vom), who eats the living that wander into the jungle, or the ghosts of spurned lovers (Phi Khon Long).

The spirit stories are varied and extremely popular. The Lao ceremony known as baci is one of the most popular folk traditions and beliefs which stem from animist traditions, and are performed at key moments in Lao life to strengthen the soul and its believed thirty-two components (kwan).

=== Naga stories ===
Folk traditions include the protector spirits of the Mekong River, the nāga which take a serpentine form and are popular motifs in Lao art, weaving and folklore. The nāga are along with phi the oldest written and oral subjects in Lao folklore. The nāga stories show a mixing of indigenous Lao beliefs and Khmer influence. The indigenous and pre-Buddhist Lao took their folklore and combined it with the serpents found in the Hindu pantheon which was familiar through interaction with the Khmer.

The nāga would again be “tamed” by the influence of Buddhism, and became popular spirit guardians depicted among Lao temples (wats). The cities of Vientiane and Luang Prabang were first ruled by nāga in Lao tradition, and the Mekong River itself was first called Nam Nyai Ngu Luang or "Great River of the Giant Serpent," for the belief that the river and surrounding terrain were gouged by the movement of a great nāga lord over the Earth.

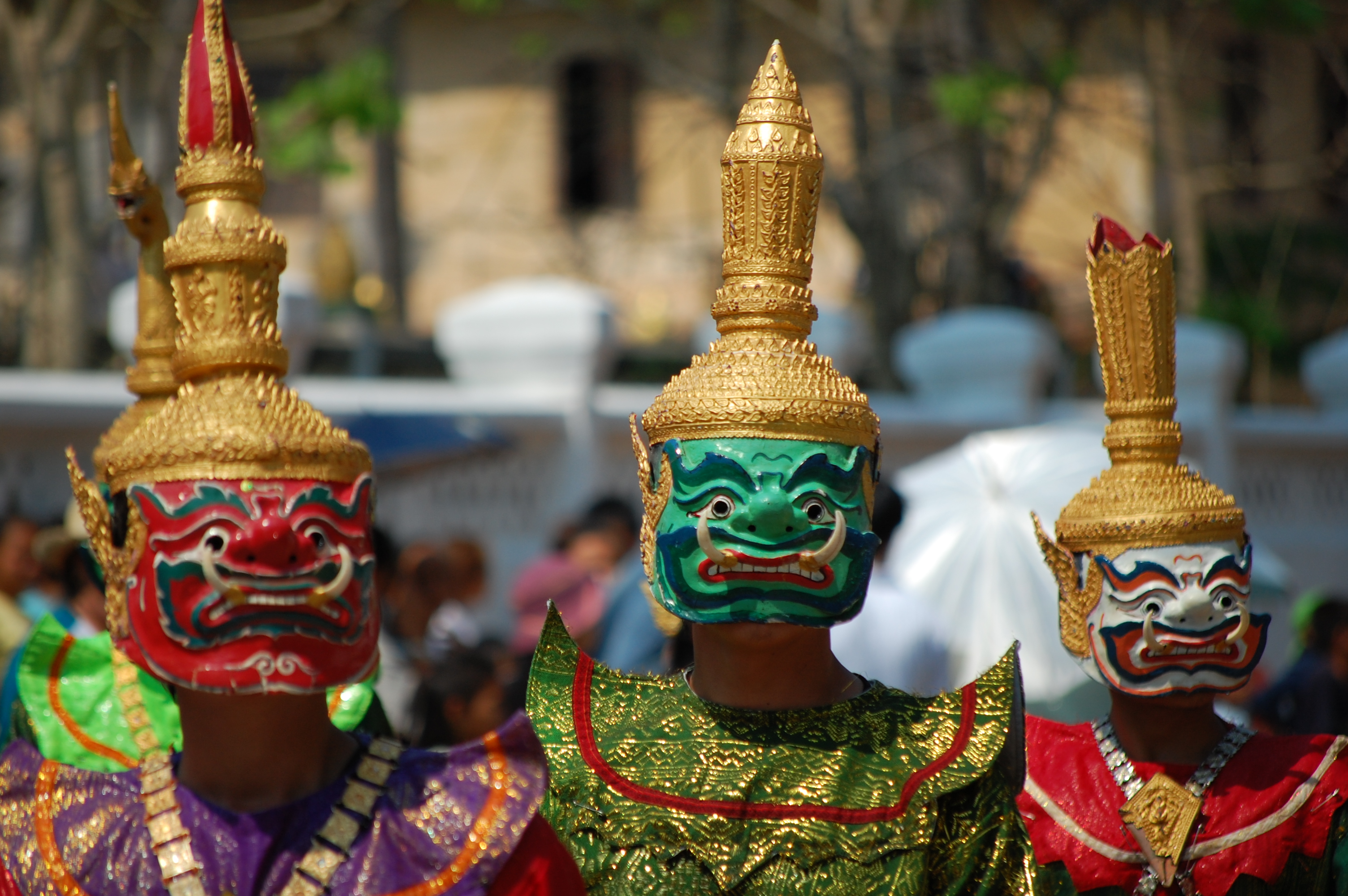
Nyak folk masks, Lao New Year

=== Trickster tales of Xiang Miang ===
Xiang Miang tales are among some of the most recent and widely known folk literature in Laos. The stories emerged as clever and irreverent political satire during the wars of the eighteenth and nineteenth century when both the Lao kings and sangha were politically at their weakest, and yet direct criticism would have broken cultural taboos or religious authority (saksit). The stories involve the protagonist Xiang Miang, who is portrayed as a boy and novice monk, and his efforts to outwit the king or abbot in both humorous and morally instructive ways.

=== Indigenous and tribal stories ===
Oral traditions among the ethnic minority groups of Laos are a rich source of folklore which developed along parallel lines to the written literature of the majority Lao Loum. Stories from the Mon–Khmer, Blang, Lamet, Khmu, Akha, Tibeto-Burmese, Tai-Rau, and Hmong–Mien create unique myths, legends, laws, customs, beliefs and identities which have been passed down largely through oral tradition.

Anthropological studies of these societies, and first hand retelling from the members of these groups have become an increasing part of modern literature about Laos, and are a source of increasing ethnographic study. Each group maintains unique aspects of their storytelling culture. For instance, the Hmong, a division of the Mien who immigrated to Laos in the nineteenth century from China, are famous for their "story cloths". These cloths, ranging in size up to several square feet, use figures to represent stories from Hmong history and folklore in a narrative form.

== Modern literature ==
Modern Lao literature is inseparable from the political history of the country. Modern literary forms began in Laos began to emerge during the French Colonial period in Laos (1893–1954). French cultural influence was strongest among the Lao nobility and upper classes who were sent to French language parochial schools in Laos, would subsequently pursue high school at the lycee in Vietnam, and in rare occasions were sent on to higher education in France. Studies into traditional Lao literary forms were made by a small group of French intellectuals representing the French cultural institute the École Française d'Extrême-Orient.

The goals of these initial studies were threefold. The first goal, was a genuine intellectual and rational discourse to better understand the Lao, from an anthropological and historical perspective. The second, being more intentionally political, was to preserve Lao cultural identity and fashion it into a more nationalist one as a means to counterbalance Thai cultural influence. Lastly, there was also a political aim to present colonialism to the French public as a "positive" for Lao society in general. The net impact to the culture was one which was positively pro-French.

The first modern Lao novel, The Sacred Buddha Image (Phra Phoutthahoup Saksit) by Somchine Nginn, was published in 1944 and was composed entirely in Lao, with an introduction in French. The fictional account follows a French-Lao detective in his efforts to recover a stolen sacred Buddha image. In the same period, French colonial influence took a decidedly more nationalistic tone to counterbalance Thai regional hegemony.

In the Isan region, the fascist policies of Field Marshal Phibun, sought to forcibly assimilate the ethnic minorities of Thailand into the Central Thai identity. Lao language, dress, and cultural expression in the Isan region were made illegal. The ultimate goal was an attempt to absorb the territories of Laos (as well as the Malay in the South, and the remaining traditions of the Tai Yuan, of Lanna) into a reunified Thailand, within the borders of the former Siam.

In promoting a Lao identity, the French had indirectly created the Lao independence movement under the Lao Issara. When Paris fell to the Axis powers in 1940, the momentary weakness of the Vichy Government, forced France to permit the Empire of Japan to establish a military presence in Indochina. Seizing on this opportunity and perceived weakness, Thailand attacked French outposts in the Franco-Thai War (1940–1941) where Thailand was able to seize areas of Laos and Cambodia.

The Empire of Japan mediated the conflict, which forced Vichy France to cede Lao territories and areas of Cambodia. In 1945 facing when the Empire of Japan was on the defensive, control of Laos was handed over to the Lao Issara. In 1946 following the end of World War II, Thailand returned the territories to France in exchange for recognition in the newly established United Nations. France reasserted control of Laos, and the Lao Issara fled to Thailand.

Lao nationalism having been firmly established during the 1930s-1940s, political movements for independence took shape after World War II. Politics and internal struggle would come to dominate Lao life and literature for the second half of the twentieth century. Literature took on a polarity between pro-French views which distrusted the influence of Vietnam and Thailand, the Issara which sought their own government but were deeply divided between pro-Thai and pro-Vietnamese factions, and communist revolutionaries among the Pathet Lao which were supported from Vietnam.

=== Post-Second World War ===
In 1946 the French established Laos as a constitutional monarchy within the French Union, in an attempt to reconcile with the nationalists. Academic study took a step forward in the early 1950s with the creation of the Comite Litteraire, the forerunner of the Lao Royal Academy, and brought together both French and Lao historians and academics for serious study with an aim of popular publication.

By 1953 the Franco–Lao Treaty of Amity and Association, gave control of Laos to the Royal Lao Government, with the exception of the military. However the rifts between the political factions were deep and split along both ideological and personal lines among the Lao royal family, and would later give rise to the Laotian Civil War. Literature produced during the war, from the early 1950s to the communist Pathet Lao victory in 1975, can be divided into two distinct groups: literature created in the regions of the country controlled by the Royal Lao Government and literature from the "liberated zones" governed by the communist Lao Patriotic Front (Pathet Lao). Further complicating the conflict was the internationalization of the Laotian Civil War, with the United States supporting the Royal Lao Government, the Vietnamese supporting the Lao Patriotic Front, and the Thai government which was concerned with its own internal security and relationship with the United States, but very cautiously seeking to preserve its own regional interests.

From 1975 to the present Lao literature has begun to reemerge after decades of wars and conflict. Some literature remains overtly political, Laos being one of the few remaining communist states is caught in a balancing act between China, Thailand and Vietnam, and all three have a history of mutual distrust stronger than cooperation. Yet, the economic power of China and its increasing nationalistic image remain a model for Muang Lao's communist regime. Statues of former Lan Xang kings were erected beginning in 2004, with the founder King Fa Ngum.

At the same time, expatriate Lao are reflecting on the period of upheaval which began in the 1940s and came to crisis during the Vietnam War era, creating a Lao literary tradition from outside the country. The younger post-war generation of Lao is influenced by Thai culture and Western pop influence, creating a modern mix of genres and topics. All of these groups and transitions are creating a broad spectrum of uniquely Lao literary voices, which are reemerging with a frequency that had long been dormant since the classical era of Lan Xang.

== Preservation efforts ==
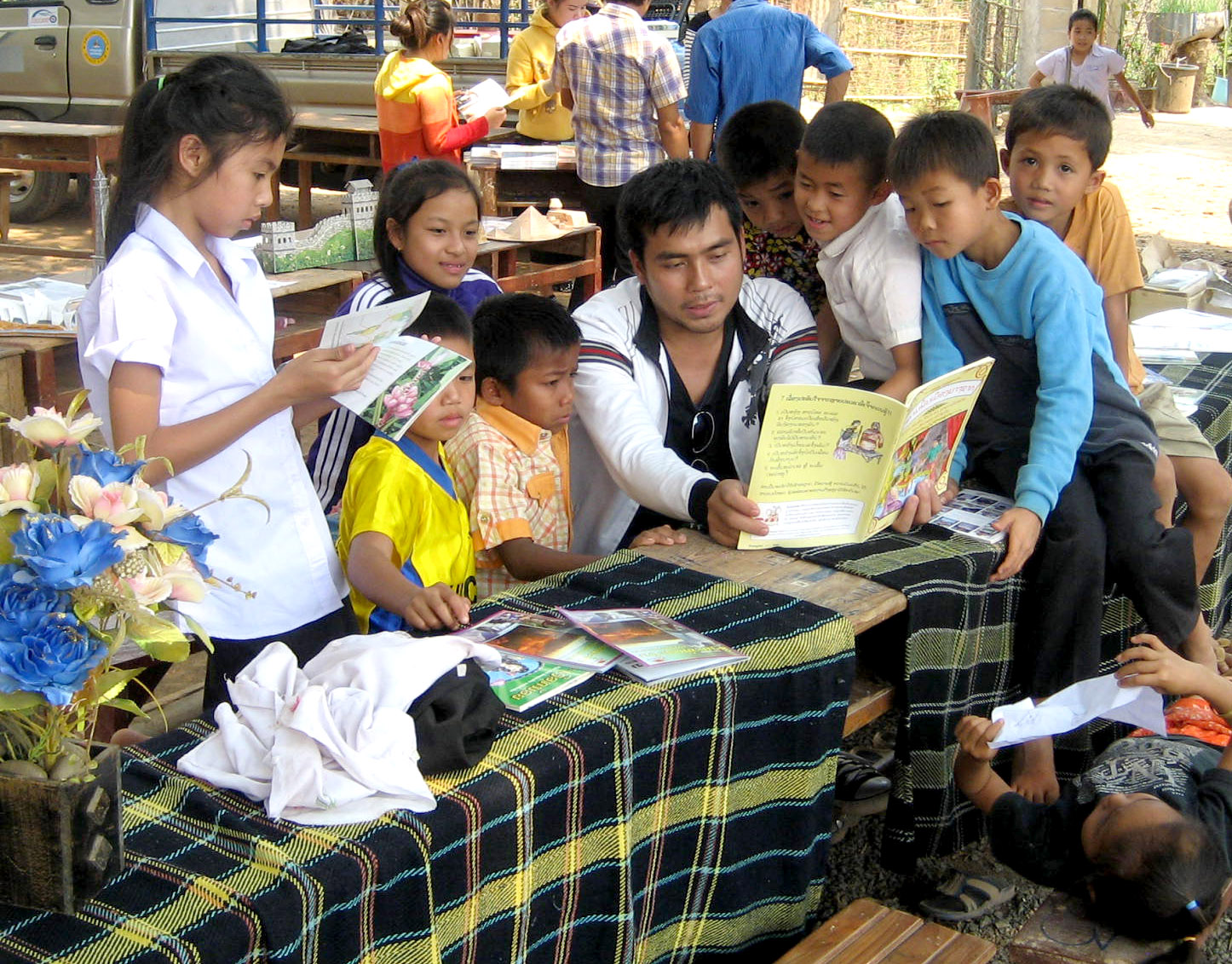
Reading aloud is one way that Big Brother Mouse, a literacy project in Laos, gets children excited about reading.

The history of conflicts in Laos over the centuries shaped much of Lao literature, and determines what primary sources have continued to survive. Yet, renewed scholarship has led to important discoveries of classical literature in the twentieth century.

The first serious efforts to interpret and preserve Lao literature began in the twentieth century. Modern efforts to translate and preserve Lao literature began with French scholars working with the École Française d'Extrême-Orient, a French colonial institute dedicated to cultural studies within Indochina. Academics like George Coedes, Henri Parmentier, and Louis Finot working in the late 1910s and 1920s produced the first in depth cultural materials on Laos since the explorations of Auguste Pavie in the 1870s.

From 1928–1940 Prince Phetsarath promoted the Chanthabouly Buddhist Institute for the promotion and preservation of Lao cultural heritage. During the 1940s and 1950s preeminent Lao scholars began to emerge. Nhoui Abhay, and Maha Sila Viravong working through the Comite Litteraire, produced the first popular publications of classical Lao literature. Maha Sila Viravong did extensive work on the early classics identifying the major masterpieces of Lao storytelling and producing one of the first popular histories of Lan Xang. Maha Viravong is also credited with the rediscovery of one of the only primary copies of the Thao Hung Thao Cheuang which he uncovered in 1943, having been kept in storage at the National Library in Bangkok for a century.

In 1956, the National Library of Laos (Lao language: ຫໍສະໝຸດແຫ່ງຊາດ) was established in Vientiane. In 1988 the first serious attempt to catalogue and digitize Lao primary sources began. The Toyota Foundation in conjunction with the Lao Ministry of Information and Culture began an initiative to catalogue over 300,000 phuk (palm-leaf books) in over 800 monasteries. From 1992-2004 the Preservation of Lao Manuscripts Programme began as a joint German and Lao venture. Starting in October 2007, the National Library has collaborated with the University of Passau and the Berlin State Library (Staatsbibliothek zu Berlin Preußischer Kulturbesitz) to create the Digital Library of Lao Manuscripts. The government granted permission for the manuscript collection to be made accessible via the Internet.

The project digitally copied and stored Lao palm leaf manuscripts, with over 86,000 texts being preserved and 12,000 texts microfilmed in a central database. The results of these efforts are over 7,500 old and unique titles, representing a massive amount of literary wealth despite the destruction and wars of the nineteenth and twentieth centuries. The effort to translate, preserve and promote these primary sources is ongoing and will protect the literary heritage of Laos for future generations.

== See also ==
- Culture of Laos
- Lao alphabet
- Lao Language
- Isan language
- Dance and Theater of Laos
- Mor lam
- Phra Lak Phra Lam
- Sang Sinxay
- Big Brother Mouse
