= Korf, North Khorasan =

Village in North Khorasan province, Iran

Korf Persian: كرف
- Village
- Location within Iran
- Coordinates: 37°11′40″N 56°55′55″E
- Country: Iran
- Province: North Khorasan
- County: Jajrom
- District: Jolgeh Sankhvast
- Rural District: Darband

Population (2016)
  - Total: 387
- Time zone: UTC+3:30 (IRST)

Korf (Persian: كرف) (Note: Also known as Kafar and Kūrf) is a village in Darband Rural District of Jolgeh Sankhvast District in Jajrom County, North Khorasan province, Iran.

== Demographics ==
=== Population ===
At the time of the 2006 National Census, the village's population was 696 in 202 households. The following census in 2011 counted 649 people in 200 households. The 2016 census measured the population of the village as 387 people in 144 households.
