= LAOO =

LAOO or Laoo or may refer to:

- Lao script (ISO 15924 code)
- Legislative Assembly of Ontario, legislative chamber of the Canadian province of Ontario
