= Darband, Jajrom =

Village in North Khorasan province, Iran

Darband Persian: دربند
- Village
- Location within Iran
- Coordinates: 37°15′06″N 56°49′42″E
- Country: Iran
- Province: North Khorasan
- County: Jajrom
- District: Jolgeh Sankhvast
- Rural District: Darband

Population (2016)
  - Total: 303
- Time zone: UTC+3:30 (IRST)

Darband (Persian: دربند) is a village in, and the capital of, Darband Rural District in Jolgeh Sankhvast District of Jajrom County, North Khorasan province, Iran.

== Demographics ==
=== Population ===
At the time of the 2006 National Census, the village's population was 337 in 93 households. The following census in 2011 counted 364 people in 100 households. The 2016 census measured the population of the village as 303 people in 99 households.
