= Jorbat =

Village in North Khorasan province, Iran

Jorbat Persian: جربت
- Village
- Location within Iran
- Coordinates: 37°05′17″N 56°44′42″E
- Country: Iran
- Province: North Khorasan
- County: Jajrom
- District: Jolgeh Sankhvast
- Rural District: Chahardeh Sankhvast

Population (2016)
  - Total: 527
- Time zone: UTC+3:30 (IRST)

Jorbat (Persian: جربت) (Note: Also romanized as Jarbat; also known as Jorbod, Jūrbud, Zhūbāt, and Zobāt) is a village in Chahardeh Sankhvast Rural District of Jolgeh Sankhvast District in Jajrom County, North Khorasan province, Iran.

== Demographics ==
=== Population ===
At the time of the 2006 National Census, the village's population was 639 in 185 households. The following census in 2011 counted 634 people in 197 households. The 2016 census measured the population of the village as 527 people in 182 households, the most populous in its rural district.
