= Qarah Cheh Robat =

Village in North Khorasan province, Iran

Qarah Cheh Robat Persian: قره چه رباط
- Village
- Location within Iran
- Coordinates: 37°13′20″N 56°52′42″E
- Country: Iran
- Province: North Khorasan
- County: Jajrom
- District: Jolgeh Sankhvast
- Rural District: Darband

Population (2016)
  - Total: 411
- Time zone: UTC+3:30 (IRST)

Qarah Cheh Robat (Persian: قره چه رباط) (Note: Also romanized as Qarah Cheh Robāţ; also known as Qarajeh Robāţ and Qareh Jarābād) is a village in Darband Rural District of Jolgeh Sankhvast District in Jajrom County, North Khorasan province, Iran.

== Demographics ==
=== Population ===
At the time of the 2006 National Census, the village's population was 354 in 76 households. The following census in 2011 counted 345 people in 86 households. The 2016 census measured the population of the village as 411 people in 111 households.
