= 3rd Secretariat of the Lao People's Revolutionary Party =

The 3rd Secretariat of the Lao People's Revolutionary Party (LPRP), officially the Secretariat of the 3rd National Congress of the Lao People's Revolutionary Party, was elected at the 1st Plenary Session of the 3rd Central Committee in 1982.

== Members ==
Rank	Name	Akson Lao	2nd SEC	4th SEC	Birth	Death	Gender
1	Kaysone Phomvihane	ໄກສອນ ພົມວິຫານ	Old	Reelected	1920	1992	Male
2	Nouhak Phoumsavanh	ໜູຮັກ ພູມສະຫວັນ	Old	Not	1910	2008	Male
3	Khamtai Siphandone	ຄໍາໄຕ ສີພັນດອນ	New	Reelected	1924	—	Male
4	Phoun Sipaseut	ພູນ ສີປະເສີດ	Old	Not	1920	1994	Male
5	Sisomphone Lovansay	ສີສົມພອນ ລໍວັນໄຊ	Old	Not	1916	1993	Male
6	Sali Vongkhamsao	ສາລີ ວົງຄໍາຊາວ	Old	Reelected	1925	1991	Male
7	Sisavath Keobounphanh	ສີສະຫວາດ ແກ້ວບຸນພັນ	Old	Reelected	1928	2020	Male
8	Samane Vignaket	ສະໝານ ວິຍະເກດ	New	Reelected	1927	2016	Male
9	Maichantan Sengmani	ໄມຈັນຕານ ແສງມະນີ	New	Reelected	1922	1991	Male
