= 4th Secretariat of the Lao People's Revolutionary Party =

The 4th Secretariat of the Lao People's Revolutionary Party (LPRP), officially the Secretariat of the 4th National Congress of the Lao People's Revolutionary Party, was elected at the 1st Plenary Session of the 4th Central Committee in 1986.

== Members ==
Rank	Name	Akson Lao	3rd SEC	Birth	Death	Gender
1	Kaysone Phomvihane	ໄກສອນ ພົມວິຫານ	Old	1920	1992	Male
2	Khamtai Siphandone	ຄໍາໄຕ ສີພັນດອນ	Old	1924	—	Male
3	Sisavath Keobounphanh	ສີສະຫວາດ ແກ້ວບຸນພັນ	Old	1928	2020	Male
4	Sali Vongkhamsao	ສາລີ ວົງຄໍາຊາວ	Old	1925	1991	Male
5	Maichantan Sengmani	ໄມຈັນຕານ ແສງມະນີ	Old	1922	1999	Male
6	Samane Vignaket	ສະໝານ ວິຍະເກດ	Old	1927	2016	Male
7	Oudom Khattigna	ອຸດົມ ຂັດຕິຍະ	New	1931	1999	Male
8	Choummaly Sayasone	ຈູມມາລີ ໄຊຍະສອນ	New	1936	—	Male
9	Somlat Chanthamat	ສົມລັດ ຈັນທະມາດ	New	?	1993	Male
