= Kalateh-ye Torkha =

Village in North Khorasan province, Iran

Kalateh-ye Torkha Persian: كلاته تركها
- Village
- Location within Iran
- Coordinates: 37°13′20″N 56°52′42″E
- Country: Iran
- Province: North Khorasan
- County: Jajrom
- District: Jolgeh Sankhvast
- Rural District: Darband

Population (2016)
  - Total: 220
- Time zone: UTC+3:30 (IRST)

Kalateh-ye Torkha (Persian: كلاته تركها) (Note: Also romanized as Kalāteh-ye Torkhā) is a village in Darband Rural District of Jolgeh Sankhvast District in Jajrom County, North Khorasan province, Iran.

== Demographics ==
=== Population ===
At the time of the 2006 National Census, the village's population was 318 in 71 households. The following census in 2011 counted 266 people in 67 households. The 2016 census measured the population of the village as 220 people in 60 households.
