= Kharashah =

Village in North Khorasan province, Iran

Kharashah Persian: خراشاه
- Village
- Location within Iran
- Coordinates: 37°07′13″N 56°48′57″E
- Country: Iran
- Province: North Khorasan
- County: Jajrom
- District: Jolgeh Sankhvast
- Rural District: Chahardeh Sankhvast

Population (2016)
  - Total: 467
- Time zone: UTC+3:30 (IRST)

Kharashah (Persian: خراشاه) (Note: Also romanized as Kharāshāh and Khorāshāh; also known as Eslāmābād (اسلام اباد), Khorāshā, and Khorāshān) is a village in Chahardeh Sankhvast Rural District of Jolgeh Sankhvast District in Jajrom County, North Khorasan province, Iran.

== Demographics ==
=== Population ===
At the time of the 2006 National Census, the village's population was 655 in 196 households. The following census in 2011 counted 499 people in 174 households. The 2016 census measured the population of the village as 467 people in 164 households.
