= Anduqan =

Village in North Khorasan province, Iran

Anduqan Persian: اندوقان
- Village
- Location within Iran
- Coordinates: 37°05′55″N 56°50′49″E
- Country: Iran
- Province: North Khorasan
- County: Jajrom
- District: Jolgeh Sankhvast
- Rural District: Chahardeh Sankhvast

Population (2016)
  - Total: 425
- Time zone: UTC+3:30 (IRST)

Anduqan (Persian: اندوقان) (Note: Also romanized as Āndūqān; also known as Andeqān) is a village in Chahardeh Sankhvast Rural District of Jolgeh Sankhvast District in Jajrom County, North Khorasan province, Iran.

== Demographics ==
=== Population ===
At the time of the 2006 National Census, the village's population was 554 in 162 households. The following census in 2011 counted 465 people in 164 households. The 2016 census measured the population of the village as 425 people in 155 households.
