= 2nd Secretariat of the Lao People's Revolutionary Party =

The 2nd Secretariat of the Lao People's Revolutionary Party (LPRP), officially the Secretariat of the 2nd National Congress of the Lao People's Revolutionary Party, was elected at the 1st Plenary Session of the 2nd Central Committee in 1972.

== Members ==
Rank	Name	Akson Lao	3rd SEC	Birth	Death	Gender
1	Kaysone Phomvihane	ໄກສອນ ພົມວິຫານ	Reelected	1920	1992	Male
2	Nouhak Phoumsavanh	ໜູຮັກ ພູມສະຫວັນ	Reelected	1910	2008	Male
3	Phoun Sipaseut	ພູນ ສີປະເສີດ	Reelected	1920	1994	Male
4	Sisomphone Lovansay	ສີສົມພອນ ລໍວັນໄຊ	Reelected	1916	1993	Male

== Add-ons ==
Name	Akson Lao	3rd SEC	Birth	Death	Gender
Sali Vongkhamsao	ສາລີ ວົງຄໍາຊາວ	Reelected	1925	1991	Male
Sisavath Keobounphanh	ສີສະຫວາດ ແກ້ວບຸນພັນ	Reelected	1928	2020	Male
