= Qeli =

Village in North Khorasan province, Iran

Qeli Persian: قلی
- Village
- Location within Iran
- Coordinates: 37°11′40″N 56°55′55″E
- Country: Iran
- Province: North Khorasan
- County: Jajrom
- District: Jolgeh Sankhvast
- Rural District: Darband

Population (2016)
  - Total: 1,298
- Time zone: UTC+3:30 (IRST)

Qeli (Persian: قلی) (Note: Also romanized as Qelī) is a village in Darband Rural District of Jolgeh Sankhvast District in Jajrom County, North Khorasan province, Iran.

== Demographics ==
=== Population ===
At the time of the 2006 National Census, the village's population was 1,277 in 273 households. The following census in 2011 counted 1,385 people in 363 households. The 2016 census measured the population of the village as 1,298 people in 352 households. It was the most populous village in its rural district.
