= Outhine Bounyavong =

Laotian writer (1942–2000)

- ອຸທິນ ບຸນຍາວົງ
- Born: 1942; Sainyabuli province, Laos
- Died: 2000 (aged 57–58)
- Occupation: Writer
- Spouse: Douangdeuane Bounyavong
- Family: Sila Viravong (father-in-law)

Outhine Bounyavong (Lao: ອຸທິນ ບຸນຍາວົງ ʻUthin Bunyāvong, 1942–2000) was a prominent present-day Laotian writer, known especially for works of contemporary fiction.

== Life ==
Bounyavong was born in 1942 in Xaignabouli Province, he grew up in the capital, Vientiane, where one of his early teachers was Pierre Somchine Nginn, author of the first novel in Lao.

Outhine held a variety of jobs during the 1960s, and began to publish short fictional works in newspapers and magazines. He came to be associated with the group of writers who were the children of Maha Sila Viravong, an important Laotian scholar. Eventually he married one of this group, Duangdeuane Viravong, a prominent author in her own right.

Outhine worked during the Laotian Civil War and, after the Communist victory in 1975, continued to write for the State Publishing House. Many of his stories celebrate traditional aspects of Laotian rural life, and at least one collection has been translated into English as Mother's Beloved (ISBN 9789747551044).

In the 1990s, Outhine worked for the Ministry of Information and Culture, where he created children's fiction.

In 1992 along with his wife, Outhine traveled from Lao to the University of Washington to instructing the Lao language to students. After which Outhine returned to Laos and with his wife they created a printing shop named Phai Nam after the magazine founded by Maha Sila Viravong.

Translations of his works have appeared in Russian, Vietnamese, and Thai languages.
