= Ark, Jajrom =

Village in North Khorasan province, Iran

Ark Persian: ارك
- Village
- Country: Iran
- Province: North Khorasan
- County: Jajrom
- District: Jolgeh Sankhvast
- Rural District: Chahardeh Sankhvast

Population (2016)
  - Total: 210
- Time zone: UTC+3:30 (IRST)

Ark (Persian: ارك) (Note: Also romanized as Ārḵ) is a village in Chahardeh Sankhvast Rural District of Jolgeh Sankhvast District in Jajrom County, North Khorasan province, Iran.

== Demographics ==
=== Population ===
At the time of the 2006 National Census, the village's population was 263 in 60 households. The following census in 2011 counted 239 people in 65 households. The 2016 census measured the population of the village as 210 people in 65 households.
