= Ghamiteh =

Village in North Khorasan province, Iran

Ghamiteh Persian: غميطه
- Village
- Location within Iran
- Coordinates: 37°03′14″N 56°45′51″E
- Country: Iran
- Province: North Khorasan
- County: Jajrom
- District: Jolgeh Sankhvast
- Rural District: Chahardeh Sankhvast

Population (2016)
  - Total: 103
- Time zone: UTC+3:30 (IRST)

Ghamiteh (Persian: غميطه) (Note: Also romanized as Ghamīţeh; also known as Qamīţeh) is a village in Chahardeh Sankhvast Rural District of Jolgeh Sankhvast District in Jajrom County, North Khorasan province, Iran.

== Demographics ==
=== Population ===
At the time of the 2006 National Census, the village's population was 140 in 40 households. The following census in 2011 counted 109 people in 34 households. The 2016 census measured the population of the village as 103 people in 38 households.
