= Kalateh-ye Shur, Jajrom =

Village in North Khorasan province, Iran

Kalateh-ye Shur Persian: كلاته شور
- Village
- Location within Iran
- Coordinates: 37°13′20″N 56°52′42″E
- Country: Iran
- Province: North Khorasan
- County: Jajrom
- District: Jolgeh Sankhvast
- Rural District: Darband

Population (2016)
  - Total: 184
- Time zone: UTC+3:30 (IRST)

Kalateh-ye Shur (Persian: كلاته شور) (Note: Also romanized as Kalāteh-ye Shūr) is a village in Darband Rural District of Jolgeh Sankhvast District in Jajrom County, North Khorasan province, Iran.

== Demographics ==
=== Population ===
At the time of the 2006 National Census, the village's population was 120 in 27 households. The following census in 2011 counted 122 people in 31 households. The 2016 census measured the population of the village as 184 people in 53 households.
