= Dara Viravong =

Lao writer

Dara Viravong Kanlagna
- Born: 1940; Laos
- Occupation: writer

Dara Viravong Kanlagna or Dara Viravong; Douangchampa (born 1940) is a Lao writer. She was involved with work that led to the creation of the Digital Library of Lao Manuscripts.

== Life ==
Kanlagna was born in Laos in 1940. Her father, Sila Viravong, was a prominent Lao scholar who designed the flag of the country. He had fourteen children and three children, Douangdeuane Bounyavong, Dara Viravong and Pakian Viravong are prominent Laotian writers.

Kanlagna had been interested in literature since early childhood. She started her career as a schoolteacher in 1958 and began to write around the same time. Few years later she became an editor at Phainam Magazine, and she also began to translate literature books. After the revolution in 1975, Dara Kanlagna worked at the Ministry of Culture as a translator, editor and writer. In 1979 she established Vannasin, a literary magazine, together with other leading Lao writers. Much of her time was dedicated to working with the Preservation of Lao Manuscripts Programme that ran from 1988 to 1994 with support from the Toyota Foundation, and from 1992 to 2004 with support from the German government. Subsequently, this programme led to the establishment of the Digital Library of Lao Manuscripts which today makes images of over 12,000 manuscript texts from across Laos accessible online. In 1996 Dara Kanlagna was awarded the Nikkei Asia Prize for Culture and Community for her passionate work with the manuscripts project.

After her retirement in 2001 she continued to write, focusing on issues in society. Her themes include the role of women in society and education, the struggles and obstacles that Lao women face, and inequalities which are often a result of ancient traditions and poverty. To raise awareness about the tradition of weaving and the fact that textile production is an important industry run and led by women in Laos, Kanlagna teamed up with members of the Group for Promotion of Art and Lao Textiles, all experienced female weavers, to record their stories and research into practices and techniques of weaving and dyeing not only of the Lao, but also of ethnic minority groups. The project resulted in the book Pha phae ni mi tamnan / Legends in the Weaving.

Duangchampa's prize-winning poetry book collection, Hak dok… chung bok ma, was published in 2005.

For her collection of poems with the title Hak dok... chung bok ma (Vientiane, 2005) Dara Kanlagna received the Southeast Asia Write Award in 2010. She wrote the poems in honour of her mother, who raised her and her thirteen siblings with great patience and determination amid hardship and poverty and provided them with a good education despite being illiterate herself.

=== Anthologies ===
- Various authors (2023). Jarquín, Carlos Javier (ed.). Canto planetario: hermandad en la Tierra. Costa Rica: HC Editores. ISBN 979-8850092115.
