= Molla Veys =

Village in North Khorasan province, Iran

Molla Veys Persian: ملاويس
- Village
- Location within Iran
- Coordinates: 37°14′51″N 56°51′27″E
- Country: Iran
- Province: North Khorasan
- County: Jajrom
- District: Jolgeh Sankhvast
- Rural District: Darband

Population (2016)
  - Total: 104
- Time zone: UTC+3:30 (IRST)

Molla Veys (Persian: ملاويس) (Note: Also romanized as Mollā Veys; also known as Kalāteh-ye Mollā Veys and Kalāteh-ye Mollāvīsh) is a village in Darband Rural District of Jolgeh Sankhvast District in Jajrom County, North Khorasan province, Iran.

== Demographics ==
=== Population ===
At the time of the 2006 National Census, the village's population was 226 in 54 households. The following census in 2011 counted 147 people in 48 households. The 2016 census measured the population of the village as 104 people in 44 households.
