= Kalateh-ye Muri =

Village in North Khorasan province, Iran

Kalateh-ye Muri Persian: كلاته موري
- Village
- Location within Iran
- Coordinates: 37°13′20″N 56°52′42″E
- Country: Iran
- Province: North Khorasan
- County: Jajrom
- District: Jolgeh Sankhvast
- Rural District: Darband

Population (2016)
  - Total: 136
- Time zone: UTC+3:30 (IRST)

Kalateh-ye Muri (Persian: كلاته موري) (Note: Also romanized as Kalāteh-ye Mūrī) is a village in Darband Rural District of Jolgeh Sankhvast District in Jajrom County, North Khorasan province, Iran.

== Demographics ==
=== Population ===
At the time of the 2006 National Census, the village's population was 188 in 39 households. The following census in 2011 counted 176 people in 39 households. The 2016 census measured the population of the village as 136 people in 35 households.
