= Chahardeh Sankhvast Rural District =

Rural district in North Khorasan province, Iran

Chahardeh Sankhvast Rural District Persian: دهستان چهارده سنخواست
- Rural District
- Location within Iran
- Coordinates: 36°58′12″N 56°43′12″E
- Country: Iran
- Province: North Khorasan
- County: Jajrom
- District: Jolgeh Sankhvast
- Capital: Sankhvast

Population (2016)
  - Total: 1,761
- Time zone: UTC+3:30 (IRST)

Chahardeh Sankhvast Rural District (Persian: دهستان چهارده سنخواست) is in Jolgeh Sankhvast District of Jajrom County, North Khorasan province, Iran. It is administered from the city of Sankhvast.

== Demographics ==
=== Population ===
At the time of the 2006 National Census, the rural district's population was 2,257 in 645 households. There were 1,970 inhabitants in 642 households at the following census of 2011. The 2016 census measured the population of the rural district as 1,761 in 615 households. The most populous of its 27 villages was Jorbat, with 527 people.

=== Other villages in the rural district ===
- Anduqan
- Ark
- Ghamiteh
- Kharashah
