= Lao (Unicode block) =

- Range: U+0E80..U+0EFF (128 code points)
- Plane: BMP
- Scripts: Lao
- Major alphabets: Lao; Pali
- Assigned: 83 code points
- Unused: 45 reserved code points
- Source standards: Thai Industrial Standard 620-2529 and 620-2533

Unicode version history
- 1.0.0 (1991): 70 (+70)
- 1.0.1 (1992): 65 (-5)
- 6.1 (2012): 67 (+2)
- 12.0 (2019): 82 (+15)
- 15.0 (2022): 83 (+1)

Unicode documentation
- Code chart ∣ Web page
- Note: Five characters were removed from the Lao block in version 1.0.1 during the process of unifying with ISO 10646.

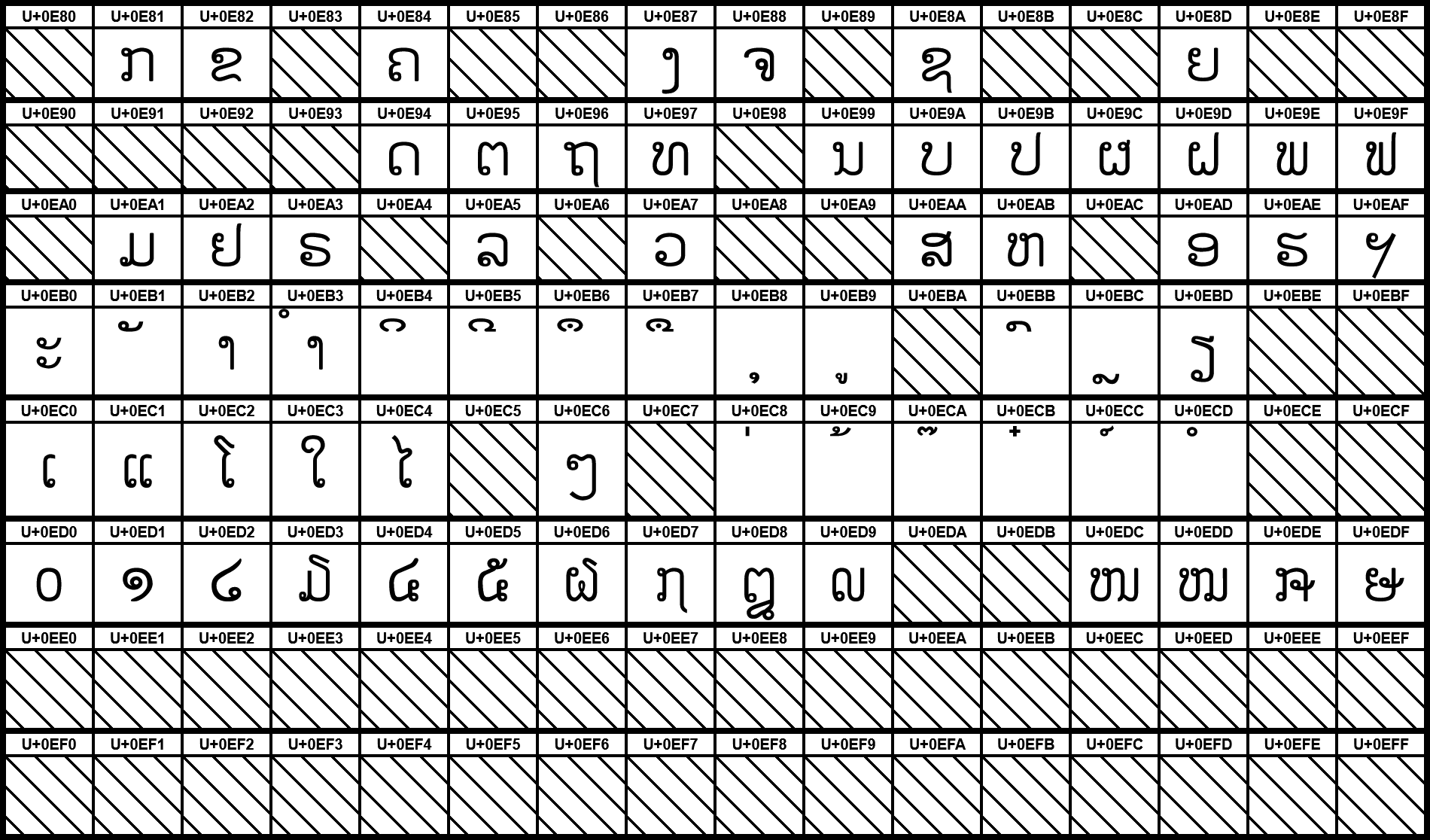
Graphical representation of the Lao Unicode block

Lao is a Unicode block containing characters for the languages of Laos. The characters of the Lao block are allocated so as to be equivalent to the similarly positioned characters of the Thai block immediately preceding it.

== Block ==
Lao^{[1]}^{[2]} Official Unicode Consortium code chart (PDF)
	0	1	2	3	4	5	6	7	8	9	A	B	C	D	E	F
U+0E8x		ກ	ຂ		ຄ		ຆ	ງ	ຈ	ຉ	ຊ		ຌ	ຍ	ຎ	ຏ
U+0E9x	ຐ	ຑ	ຒ	ຓ	ດ	ຕ	ຖ	ທ	ຘ	ນ	ບ	ປ	ຜ	ຝ	ພ	ຟ
U+0EAx	ຠ	ມ	ຢ	ຣ		ລ		ວ	ຨ	ຩ	ສ	ຫ	ຬ	ອ	ຮ	ຯ
U+0EBx	ະ	ັ	າ	ຳ	ິ	ີ	ຶ	ື	ຸ	ູ	຺	ົ	ຼ	ຽ		
U+0ECx	ເ	ແ	ໂ	ໃ	ໄ		ໆ		່	້	໊	໋	໌	ໍ	໎	
U+0EDx	໐	໑	໒	໓	໔	໕	໖	໗	໘	໙			ໜ	ໝ	ໞ	ໟ
U+0EEx																
U+0EFx																
Notes: 1. As of Unicode version 16.0; 2. Grey areas indicate non-assigned code points

== History ==
The following Unicode-related documents record the purpose and process of defining specific characters in the Lao block:

Version	Final code points (Note: Proposed code points and characters names may differ from final code points and names)	Count	UTC ID	L2 ID	WG2 ID	Document
1.0.0	U+0E81..0E82, 0E84, 0E87..0E88, 0E8A, 0E8D, 0E94..0E97, 0E99..0E9F, 0EA1..0EA3, 0EA5, 0EA7, 0EAA..0EAB, 0EAD..0EB9, 0EBB..0EBD, 0EC0..0EC4, 0EC6, 0EC8..0ECD, 0ED0..0ED9, 0EDC..0EDD	65	UTC/1991-058			Whistler, Ken, Thai, Lao
1.0.0	U+0E81..0E82, 0E84, 0E87..0E88, 0E8A, 0E8D, 0E94..0E97, 0E99..0E9F, 0EA1..0EA3, 0EA5, 0EA7, 0EAA..0EAB, 0EAD..0EB9, 0EBB..0EBD, 0EC0..0EC4, 0EC6, 0EC8..0ECD, 0ED0..0ED9, 0EDC..0EDD	65	UTC/1991-048B			Whistler, Ken (1991-03-27), "Thai, Lao", Draft Minutes from the UTC meeting #46 day 2, 3/27 at Apple
1.0.0	U+0E81..0E82, 0E84, 0E87..0E88, 0E8A, 0E8D, 0E94..0E97, 0E99..0E9F, 0EA1..0EA3, 0EA5, 0EA7, 0EAA..0EAB, 0EAD..0EB9, 0EBB..0EBD, 0EC0..0EC4, 0EC6, 0EC8..0ECD, 0ED0..0ED9, 0EDC..0EDD	65	UTC/1992-xxx			Freytag, Asmus (1992-05-12), "B. Indic SC", Unconfirmed minutes for UTC Meeting #52, May 8, 1992 at Xerox
1.0.0	U+0E81..0E82, 0E84, 0E87..0E88, 0E8A, 0E8D, 0E94..0E97, 0E99..0E9F, 0EA1..0EA3, 0EA5, 0EA7, 0EAA..0EAB, 0EAD..0EB9, 0EBB..0EBD, 0EC0..0EC4, 0EC6, 0EC8..0ECD, 0ED0..0ED9, 0EDC..0EDD	65		L2/02-017		Whistler, Ken (2002-01-14), Character Properties for avagrahas, etc.
1.0.0	U+0E81..0E82, 0E84, 0E87..0E88, 0E8A, 0E8D, 0E94..0E97, 0E99..0E9F, 0EA1..0EA3, 0EA5, 0EA7, 0EAA..0EAB, 0EAD..0EB9, 0EBB..0EBD, 0EC0..0EC4, 0EC6, 0EC8..0ECD, 0ED0..0ED9, 0EDC..0EDD	65		L2/05-357	N3137	West, Andrew (2005-10-30), Note on Lao Character Names
1.0.0	U+0E81..0E82, 0E84, 0E87..0E88, 0E8A, 0E8D, 0E94..0E97, 0E99..0E9F, 0EA1..0EA3, 0EA5, 0EA7, 0EAA..0EAB, 0EAD..0EB9, 0EBB..0EBD, 0EC0..0EC4, 0EC6, 0EC8..0ECD, 0ED0..0ED9, 0EDC..0EDD	65		L2/05-279		Moore, Lisa (2005-11-10), "Lao Names (C.15)", UTC #105 Minutes
1.0.0	U+0E81..0E82, 0E84, 0E87..0E88, 0E8A, 0E8D, 0E94..0E97, 0E99..0E9F, 0EA1..0EA3, 0EA5, 0EA7, 0EAA..0EAB, 0EAD..0EB9, 0EBB..0EBD, 0EC0..0EC4, 0EC6, 0EC8..0ECD, 0ED0..0ED9, 0EDC..0EDD	65			N3103 (pdf, doc)	Umamaheswaran, V. S. (2006-08-25), "M48.36", Unconfirmed minutes of WG 2 meeting 48, Mountain View, CA, USA; 2006-04-24/27
6.1	U+0EDE..0EDF	2		L2/10-335	N3893R	Hosken, Martin (2010-10-05), Proposal to add minority characters to Lao script
6.1	U+0EDE..0EDF	2		L2/10-416R		Moore, Lisa (2010-11-09), "Consensus 125-C20", UTC #125 / L2 #222 Minutes
6.1	U+0EDE..0EDF	2			N3903 (pdf, doc)	"M57.02i", Unconfirmed minutes of WG2 meeting 57, 2011-03-31
12.0	U+0E86, 0E89, 0E8C, 0E8E..0E93, 0E98, 0EA0, 0EA8..0EA9, 0EAC, 0EBA	15		L2/17-106R	N4861	Rajan, Vinodh; Mitchell, Ben; Jansche, Martin; Brawer, Sascha (2017-07-19), Revised Proposal to Encode Lao Characters for Pali
12.0	U+0E86, 0E89, 0E8C, 0E8E..0E93, 0E98, 0EA0, 0EA8..0EA9, 0EAC, 0EBA	15		L2/17-255		Anderson, Deborah; Whistler, Ken; Pournader, Roozbeh; Moore, Lisa; Liang, Hai (2017-07-28), "6. Lao", Recommendations to UTC #152 July-August 2017 on Script Proposals
12.0	U+0E86, 0E89, 0E8C, 0E8E..0E93, 0E98, 0EA0, 0EA8..0EA9, 0EAC, 0EBA	15		L2/17-222		Moore, Lisa (2017-08-11), "D.4", UTC #152 Minutes
12.0	U+0E86, 0E89, 0E8C, 0E8E..0E93, 0E98, 0EA0, 0EA8..0EA9, 0EAC, 0EBA	15			N4953 (pdf, doc)	"M66.14", Unconfirmed minutes of WG 2 meeting 66, 2018-03-23
15.0	U+0ECE	1		L2/21-093		Rajan, Vinodh; Bhikkhu, Jayasāro (2021-04-21), Proposal to Encode Lao Yamakkan
15.0	U+0ECE	1		L2/21-073		Anderson, Deborah; Whistler, Ken; Pournader, Roozbeh; Moore, Lisa; Liang, Hai (2021-04-23), "11. Lao", Recommendations to UTC #167 April 2021 on Script Proposals
15.0	U+0ECE	1		L2/21-143		Rajan, Vinodh (2021-07-14), Response to Comments on Lao Yamakkan
15.0	U+0ECE	1		L2/21-130		Anderson, Deborah; Whistler, Ken; Pournader, Roozbeh; Liang, Hai (2021-07-26), "16. Lao", Recommendations to UTC #168 July 2021 on Script Proposals
15.0	U+0ECE	1		L2/21-123		Cummings, Craig (2021-08-03), "B.1 Section 16, Lao", Draft Minutes of UTC Meeting 168
