= Darband Rural District =

Rural district in North Khorasan province, Iran

Darband Rural District Persian: دهستان دربند
- Rural District
- Location within Iran
- Coordinates: 37°11′24″N 56°48′00″E
- Country: Iran
- Province: North Khorasan
- County: Jajrom
- District: Jolgeh Sankhvast
- Established: 1998
- Capital: Darband

Population (2016)
  - Total: 3,043
- Time zone: UTC+3:30 (IRST)

Darband Rural District (Persian: دهستان دربند) is in Jolgeh Sankhvast District of Jajrom County, North Khorasan province, Iran. Its capital is the village of Darband.

== Demographics ==
=== Population ===
At the time of the 2006 National Census, the rural district's population was 3,530 in 839 households. There were 3,454 inhabitants in 934 households at the following census of 2011. The 2016 census measured the population of the rural district as 3,043 in 898 households. The most populous of its 17 villages was Qeli, with 1,298 people.

=== Other villages in the rural district ===
- Kalateh-ye Muri
- Kalateh-ye Shur
- Kalateh-ye Torkha
- Korf
- Molla Veys
- Qarah Cheh Robat
