= Douangdeuane Bounyavong =

Laotian writer

- ດວງເດືອນ ບຸນຍາວົງສ໌
- Born: Douangdeuane Viravong; June 11, 1947 (age 79)
- Other name: Dok Ked
- Occupation: Writer
- Notable work: Kam Pha Phi Noi ('The Little Orphan and the Spirit’)
- Spouse: Outhine Bounyavong
- Father: Sila Viravong

Douangdeuane Bounyavong (Lao: ດວງເດືອນ ບຸນຍາວົງສ໌; Dūangdư̄an Bunyāvong; born 11 June 1947, also known by her maiden name Douangdeuane Viravong), pen name Dok Ked (Dō̜kkēt), is a Laotian writer. Her best known story is Kam Pha Phi Noi ('The Little Orphan and the Spirit’).

== Life ==
She was born in 1947. Her father, Sila Viravong, was a prominent Lao scholar who designed the flag of the country. He had fourteen children and three children, Douangdeuane Bounyavong, Dara Viravong and Pakian Viravong are prominent Laotian writers.

She married Outhine Bounyavong, a contemporary Laotian fiction writer.

She has written poems, several textiles books and novels and transcribed numerous traditional stories, of which the best-known is Kam Pha Phi Noi ('The Little Orphan and the Spirit’). She is engaged in literacy, e.g. by participating at the Big Brother Mouse project, and participates on running a publishing house and a shop providing children's books in the Lao language.

In 2005, Peace Women Across the Globe selected her as one of the thousand peace women from the Asia Pacific region. She was awarded with the Fukukoa Art and Culture Prize. She is also a recipient of the S.E.A. Write Award.

== Bibliography ==
=== Works in Lao language ===
- Dō̜kkēt 'Athan hǣng phongphai Viangchan: Bō̜risat Phainām Kānphim læ Khō̜mphiutœ, 1995 (novel)
- Dō̜kkēt Dō̜k sutthāi lư̄ ngām [Vientiane]: Kom Vannakhadī læ Vatthanatham Mahāson, 1995 (biography of Mari Viravong, the mother of the author)
- Douangdeuane Bounyavong et al. Phǣnphan lāi nai sin sāimai = Infinite Design: The Art of Silk Vientiane: Lao Women's Union, 1995 (Lao/English)
- Douangdeuane Bounyavong Thao Hung Khun Cheuang, Weeraburut song phang khong [the Hero of the Two Sides of the Mekong River Banks] Bangkok: Phikkhanet Printing Center, 1995
- Douangdeuane Bounyavong Vatchanānukom pakō̜p hūp Vientiane: K. S. Kanphim, 1998 (pictorial dictionary for children)
- Dō̜kkēt Chotmāi nī khō̜ fāk thœng ʻāi: hōm lư̄angsan Vientiane: Dokket, 2004 (Collection of short stories)
- Douangdeuane Bounyavong et al. Thao Hung Thao Cheuang Epic: Adaptation into Modern Prose Vientiane: The National Library of Laos, 2000 (text in Lao, parts in English)
- Douangdeuane Bounyavong, Inkiane Dejvongsa Mư̄a mǣ khao khuk: lưangching khō̜ng phūying khonnưng = When Mother Was In Prison Vientiane: Dokked, 2004 (Lao/English)

=== Works in English language ===
- Douangdeuane Bounyavong, Othong Khaminxu Traditions and rites in Thao Hung epic Vientiane: Vannasin, 1991
- Douangdeuane Bounyavong A comparative study on the political ideology expressed in the Thao Hung Thao Cheaung epic, with reference to local chronicle of Lao-Thai groups Tokyo: Institute of Asian Cultures – Sophia University, 1995
- Duang Deuane Bounyavong, Kham Pin Phiatheb Report on the survey and situation regarding the trafficking of children in Lao PDR Vientiane: PDR, 1995 (abridged version of a UNICEF report)
- Douangdeuane Bounyavong et al. Legends in the Weaving Vientiane: Dokked, 2001
- Douangdeuane Bounyavong Lao textiles: prayers floating on fabric Fukuoka-shi: Fukuoka Art Museum, 2005 (English/Japanese)
