= Sankhvast =

City in North Khorasan province, Iran

Sankhvast Persian: سنخواست
- City
- Location within Iran
- Coordinates: 37°06′01″N 56°51′13″E
- Country: Iran
- Province: North Khorasan
- County: Jajrom
- District: Jolgeh Sankhvast
- Established as a city: 2000

Population (2016)
  - Total: 2,077
- Time zone: UTC+3:30 (IRST)

Sankhvast (Persian: سنخواست) (Note: Also romanized as Sankhvāst; also known as Sanghas, Sangkhuast, Sankhāş, and Sankhāst) is a city in, and the capital of, Jolgeh Sankhvast District in Jajrom County, North Khorasan province, Iran. It also serves as the administrative center for Chahardeh Sankhvast Rural District. The village of Sankhvast was converted to a city in 2000.

== Demographics ==
=== Population ===
At the time of the 2006 National Census, the city's population was 2,009 in 590 households. The following census in 2011 counted 2,120 people in 677 households. The 2016 census measured the population of the city as 2,077 people in 688 households.
