= Sila Viravong =

Lao scholar and writer

Maha Sila Viravong
- ສິລາ ວິຣະວົງສ໌
- Born: Sila Chanthanam สิลา จันทะนาม; 1 August 1905; Roi Et, Siam
- Died: 18 February 1987 (aged 81); Vientiane, Laos
- Occupations: Scholar; writer
- Family: 3, including Douangdeuane

Maha Sila Viravong (also known as Sila Viravong; Lao: ສິລາ ວີຣະວົງສ໌, RTGS: Sila Wirawong, pronounced [sí(ʔ).láː wíː.rā.wóŋ]) was a Lao historian, philologist, and scholar of traditional Lao literature, history, and culture. He modernized the Lao alphabet and was an important intellectual figure in the Lao independence movement during the struggles against French colonial rule. He was an active member of the Lao Issara movement and served as the personal secretary to Prince Phetsarath Rattanavongsa (January 10, 1889 – October 1, 1959). His name is often preceded by the honorific title "Maha", and he is frequently referred to as "Maha Sila."

He was the father of Laotian writers Douangdeuane Bounyavong, Dara Viravong, and Pakian Viravong.

== Biography ==
Born into a family of farmers from Champassak, Maha Sila Viravong was born on August 1, 1905 in Roi Et Province (Thai: ร้อยเอ็ด) in the Isan region of Thailand. As a young novice monk, he learned the Tai Tham alphabet and the Lao script from palm-leaf manuscripts and developed an early passion for Lao literature and history, which survived in temple libraries after the fall of Lan Xang to the Siamese. After leaving the monkhood, he traveled to Bangkok to study Pali.

In 1929, he became secretary to Prince Phetsarath Rattanavongsa, a major figure in Lao nationalism during the French protectorate. In the 1930s, he joined the “Movement for National Renovation,” founded by young Laotian intellectuals under French oversight, aiming to maintain national influence.

He later joined the independence movement Lao Issara (“Free Laos”) following the Japanese coup d'état in French Indochina in 1945. When France regained control in 1946, he went into exile in Bangkok, conducting research at the National Library of Thailand. He returned to Laos in 1949, becoming a Pali professor at the Buddhist Institute in Vientiane.

He married Nang Maly in Vientiane. Among their fourteen children were writers Douangdeuane and Dara Viravong. Although he retired in 1963, after the establishment of the Lao People's Democratic Republic in 1975, he was appointed an expert advisor to the Ministry of National Education. He continued teaching, researching, and writing until his death in February , 1987.

== Contributions ==
In the 1930s, supported by the Buddhist Institute in Vientiane and the Buddhist Academic Council, he expanded the Lao script to include characters for Pali and Sanskrit, filling gaps in the existing system. Though the Buddhist Institute published books using these extensions, they gradually fell out of use by 1975. In 2019, the extended Indic characters were added to Unicode 12.

He designed the current Flag of Laos in 1945.

Viravong also opposed the proposed Latinization of the Lao script and sought to modernize it instead. He authored a Lao grammar, dictionary, and a transcription system for Pali, which is still used in temples today. He also wrote the first official textbook on the History of Laos and developed a Lao calendar still used alongside foreign ones.

His major published works include Phongsavadane Lao (History of Laos, 1957), based on the chronicles of Lan Xang, and his biography of Prince Phetsarath, which was published posthumously. Though his work is occasionally criticized for nationalistic tones and limited academic rigor, his influence on Lao national identity and historiography remains significant.

== Works ==
1. Vessantara Jātaka in Verse (1923)
2. Buddhist Biography in Verse (1923)
3. Temiya Kumāra Jātaka in Verse (1930)
4. Suvaṇṇasāma Jātaka in Verse (1930)
5. Book of Buddhist Chants with Translation, called Pathom Chulaprit (1933)
6. Dhamma Textbook, Part 1 & Part 2 (1933)
7. Buddhist Biography: The Bodhisattva Period, in Verse (1933)
8. Lao Grammar Textbook, Part 1: Orthography (1935)
9. Pali Grammar Textbook, 4 Parts (1938)
10. Thai-Vientiane Poetry Manual and Kāpi Saravilasini (1942)
11. Urankanidān in Verse (1943) – published by S. Thammabhakdi Publishing House
12. Buddhist Prophecies in Verse (1945)
13. Ancient Lao Traditions, Part 1: Various Khwan Rituals (1955)
14. History of the Lao Nation (Revised) (1958)
15. History of That Luang Stupa, Vientiane (1958)
16. Lao Dictionary (1960)
17. Literature for Education (1960)
18. Mahājanaka Jātaka in Verse (1962)
19. History of King Anouvong (1968)
20. History of Lao Literature (1974)
21. Ancient Lao Traditions, Part 2: Birth, Ordination, Marriage, Death, Naming Customs (1973–75)
22. History of Vientiane, Wat Phu Champasak, and Champasak Town (1973–75)
23. Hit Sipsong (The Twelve Month Festivals) (1974)
24. History of October 14, 1945 (1975)
25. History of Flags and the Lao Flag (1975)
26. Biography of Chao Maha Oupahat Phetsarath (published 1995) – Thai edition published as Chao Phetsarath: The Iron Man of the Lao Kingdom
27. Lao Grammar, 4 Parts (published 1995)
28. The Value of Literature (published 1996)
29. Autobiographical Poems, and Love & Travel Verses, with Historical Notes (year of publication unknown)
