= National Library of Laos =

Coordinates: 17.9640°N 102.6079°E

- ຫໍສະໝຸດແຫ່ງຊາດ
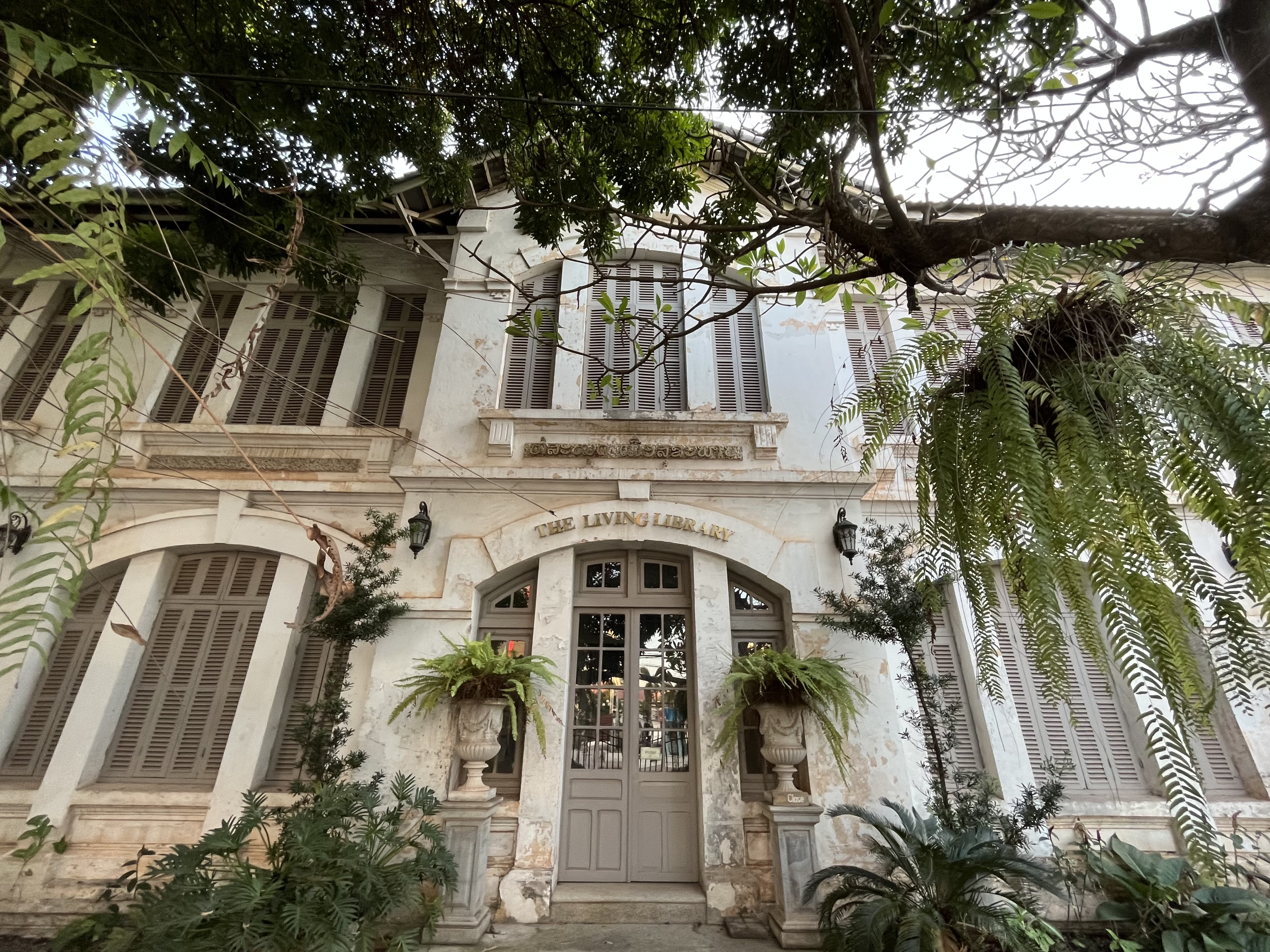
- The Library building
- Location: Vientiane, Laos, Laos
- Type: Public, National library.
- Established: 1956 (70 years ago)

The National Library of Laos (Lao language: ຫໍສະໝຸດແຫ່ງຊາດ, romanized hosamud aehngsad) is a library located in Vientiane, Laos. First established on 1 July 1956, it moved to its current location in 1988. The National Library plays an important role in preserving materials about Laos.

Since 1989, it has operated the Lao Ancient Manuscript Preservation Project which documents ancient text written in Lao and Sanskrit. Starting in October 2007, the library has collaborated with the University of Passau and the Berlin State Library (Staatsbibliothek zu Berlin Preußischer Kulturbesitz) to create the Digital Library of Lao Manuscripts (ໂຄງການຫໍສະໝຸດດິຈິຕອລໜັງສືໃບລານລາວ). The government of the Lao People's Democratic Republic has granted permission for the manuscript collection to be made accessible via the Internet.

A new national library was completed in 2017.

== See also ==
- List of national libraries
