= Lao script =

Abugida script for the Lao language

Akson Lao ອັກສອນລາວ
- Script type: Abugida
- Period: c. 1497 – present
- Direction: Left-to-right
- Languages: Lao, Isan and others

Related scripts
- Parent systems: Egyptian hieroglyphs: Proto-Sinaitic; Phoenician; Aramaic; Brahmi; Tamil-Brahmi; Pallava; Khmer; Sukhothai; Fakkham; Tai Noi; Akson Lao

ISO 15924
- ISO 15924: Laoo (356), Lao

Unicode
- Unicode alias: Lao
- Unicode range: U+0E80–U+0EFF

Lao script or Akson Lao (Lao: ອັກສອນລາວ [ʔák.sɔ̌ːn láːw]) is the primary script used to write the Lao language and other languages in Laos. Its earlier form, the Tai Noi script, was also used to write the Isan language, but was replaced by the Thai script. It has 27 consonants (ພະຍັນຊະນະ [pʰā.ɲán.sā.nāʔ]), 7 consonantal ligatures (ພະຍັນຊະນະປະສົມ [pʰā.ɲán.sā.nāʔ pā.sǒm]), 33 vowels (ສະຫລະ/ສະຫຼະ [sā.láʔ]), and 4 tone marks (ວັນນະຍຸດ [wán.nā.ɲūt]).

The Lao abugida was adapted from the Khmer script, which itself was derived from the Pallava script, a variant of the Grantha script descended from the Brāhmī script, which was used in southern India and South East Asia during the 5th and 6th centuries AD. Akson Lao is a sister system to the Thai script, with which it shares many similarities and roots. However, Lao has fewer characters and is formed in a more curvilinear fashion than Thai.

Lao is written from left to right. Vowels can be written above, below, in front of, or behind consonants, with some vowel combinations written before, over, and after. Spaces for separating words and punctuation were traditionally not used, but space is used and functions in place of a comma or period. The script is unicameral, i.e. the letters have no majuscule or minuscule (upper- and lowercase) differentiation.

== History ==
The Lao script ultimately derived from a variant of the Old Khmer script of Angkor, through the Sukhothai script. By the late 15th century, a form of the Sukhothai script had reached the Mekong River basin, after which the script developed differences between its Thai and Lao variants.

In the 1930s, Maha Sila Viravong, a Buddhist scholar, backed by the Buddhist Institute in Vientiane and the Buddhist Academic Council, added an additional set of Lao characters to support Pali and Sanskrit, thereby filling the missing gaps in the existing script. While the Buddhist Institute published books that utilised these extended Indic characters, they did not see widespread usage, and fell out of usage by 1975. In the 1960s, the Lao People's Revolutionary Party simplified the spelling to be phonemic and omitted extra letters used to write words of Pali-Sanskrit origin.

In 2019, the extended Indic characters were added to Unicode 12.

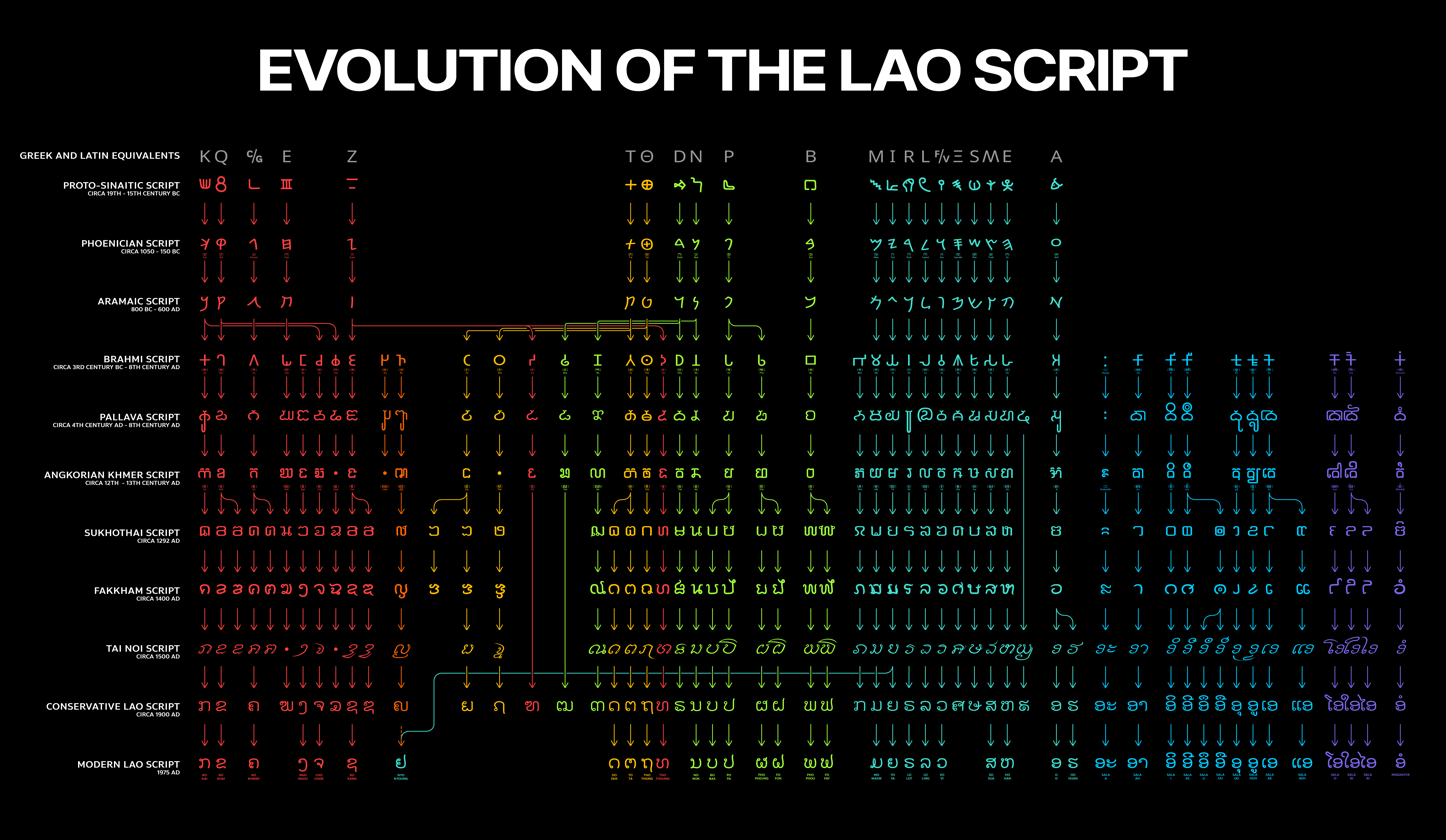
Evolution of the Lao Script

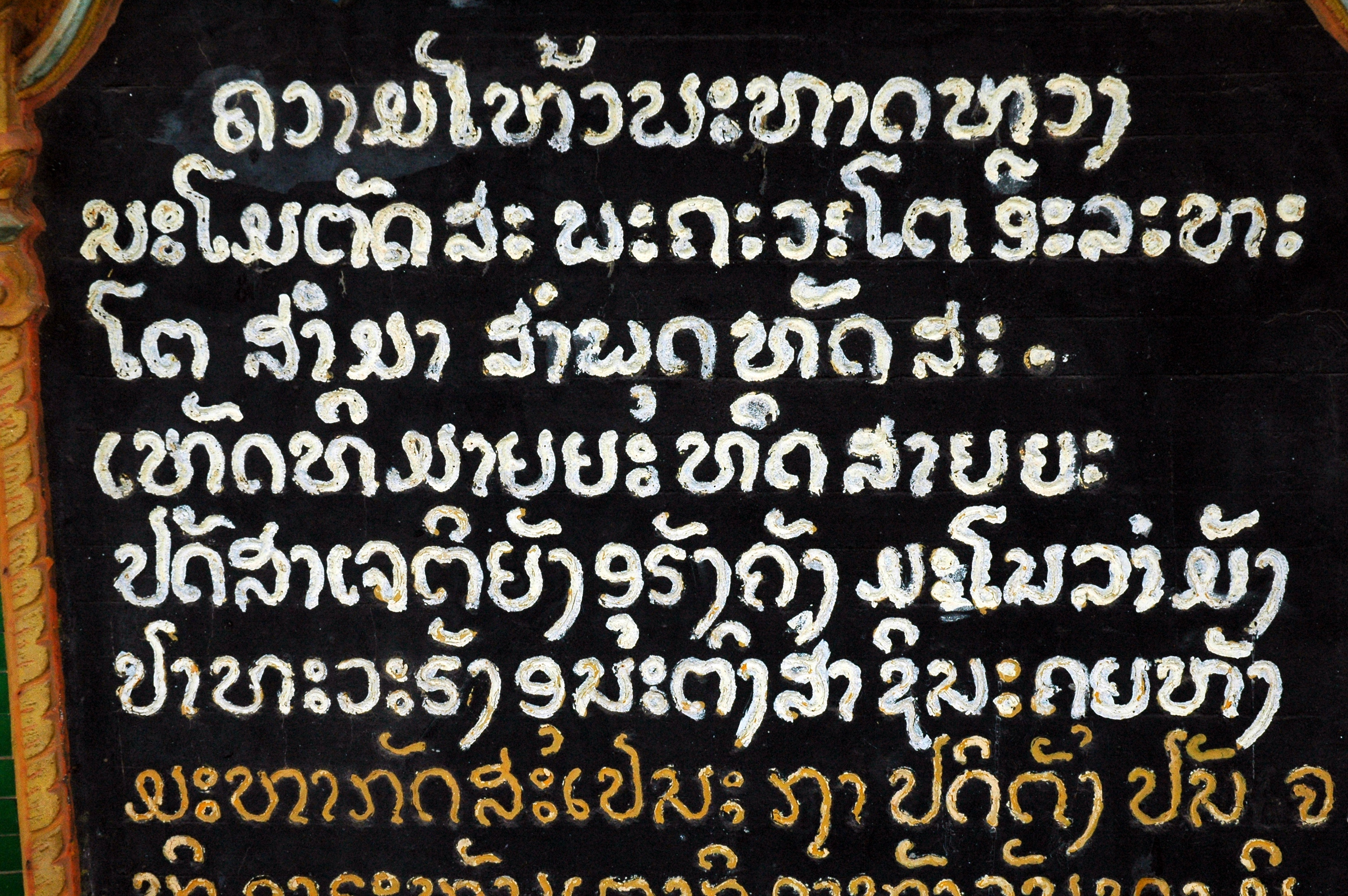
Lao script on a sign at Wat That Luang, Vientiane.

== Consonants ==
The twenty-seven consonants of the Lao alphabet are divided into three tone classes—high (ສູງ [sǔːŋ]), middle (ກາງ [kàːŋ]), and low (ຕ່ຳ [tām])—which determine the tonal pronunciation of the word in conjunction with the four tone marks and distinctions between short and long vowels. Aside from tone, there are twenty-one distinct consonant sounds that occur in the Lao language. Each letter has an acrophonical name that either begins with or features the letter prominently, and is used to teach the letter and serves to distinguish them from other, homophonous consonants. The letter ອ is a special null consonant used as a mandatory anchor for vowels, which cannot stand alone, and also to serve as a vowel in its own right.

The letter ຣ (r) is a relatively new re-addition to the Lao alphabet. It was dropped as part of a language reform because most speakers pronounced it as "l", and had an ambiguous status for several decades. A 1999 dictionary does not include it when listing the full alphabet but does use it to spell many country names. A comprehensive dictionary published by a high-ranking official in the Ministry of Information and Culture did not include it. However, as the Lao vocabulary began to incorporate more foreign names (such as Europe, Australia, and America) it filled a need and is now taught in schools. The letter ຣ can also be found in Unit 14 (ບົດທີ 14 ຮ ຫ ຣ) of a textbook published by the government. It is generally used as the first consonant of a syllable, or to follow a leading consonant, rarely as a final consonant.

=== Consonant chart ===
The table below shows the Lao consonant, its name, its pronunciation according to the International Phonetic Alphabet (IPA), as well as various romanisation schemes, such as the French-based systems in use by both the US Board of Geographic Names and the British Permanent Committee on Geographical Names (BGN/PCGN), the Anglo-based system in use by the US Library of Congress (LC), Royal Thai General System of Transcription (RTGS) used in Thailand, and finally its Unicode name. A slash indicates the pronunciation at the beginning juxtaposed with its pronunciation at the end of a syllable.

Letter	Name		Initial position				Final position				Unicode	Tone Class
Letter	Name		IPA	BGN/PCGN	LC	RTGS	IPA	BGN/PCGN	LC	RTGS	Unicode	Tone Class
ກ	ໄກ່	[kāj], chicken	/k/	k			/k/	k			KO	Middle
ຂ	ໄຂ່	[kʰāj], egg	/kʰ/, /x/	kh			–	–			KHO SUNG	High
ຄ	ຄວາຍ	[kʰwáːj], water buffalo	/kʰ/, /x/	kh			–	–			KHO TAM	Low
ງ	ງົວ or ງູ	[ŋúa], ox or [ŋúː], snake	/ŋ/	ng			/ŋ/	ng			NGO	Low
ຈ	ຈອກ or ຈົວ	[tɕɔ̏ːk], glass or [tɕùa] Buddhist novice	/tɕ/	ch			–	–			CO	Middle
ສ	ເສືອ	[sɯ̌a], tiger	/s/	s			–	–			SO SUNG	High
ຊ	ຊ້າງ	[sâːŋ], elephant	/s/	x	s		–	–			SO TAM	Low
ຍ	ຍຸງ	[ɲúŋ], mosquito	/ɲ/	gn	ny	y	/j/	y	i		NYO	Low
ດ	ເດັກ	[dék], child	/d/	d			/t/	t			DO	Middle
ຕ	ຕາ	[tàː], eye	/t/	t			–	–			TO	Middle
ຖ	ຖົງ	[tʰǒŋ], stocking, bag	/tʰ/	th			–	–			THO SUNG	High
ທ	ທຸງ	[tʰúŋ], flag	/tʰ/	th			–	–			THO TAM	Low
ນ	ນົກ	[nòk], bird	/n/	n			/n/	ne	n		NO	Low
ບ	ແບ້	[bɛ̑ː], goat	/b/	b			/p/	p			BO	Middle
ປ	ປາ	[pàː], fish	/p/	p			–	–			PO	Middle
ຜ	ເຜິ້ງ	[pʰɤ̏ŋ], bee	/pʰ/	ph			–	–			PHO SUNG	High
ຝ	ຝົນ	[fǒn], rain	/f/	f			–	–			FO TAM (Note: The Unicode names for the characters ຝ (FO TAM) and ຟ (FO SUNG) are reversed. This error was introduced into the Unicode standard and cannot be fixed, as character names are immutable.)	High
ພ	ພູ	[pʰúː], mountain	/pʰ/	ph			–	–			PHO TAM	Low
ຟ	ໄຟ	[fáj], fire	/f/	f			–	–			FO SUNG	Low
ມ	ແມວ	[mɛ́ːw], cat	/m/	m			/m/	m			MO	Low
ຢ	ຢາ	[jàː], medicine	/j/	y			–	–			YO	Middle
ຣ	ຣົຖ (ລົດ) or ຣະຄັງ (ລະຄັງ)	[ròt] ([lōt]), car or [rā.kʰáŋ], bell	/r/, /l/	r			/n/	ne	n		LO LING (Note: The Unicode names for the characters ຣ (LO LING) and ລ (LO LOOT) are reversed. This error was introduced into the Unicode standard and cannot be fixed, as character names are immutable.)	Low
ລ	ລີງ	[líːŋ], monkey	/l/	l			–	–			LO LOOT	Low
ວ	ວີ	[wíː], fan	/w/	v	w		/w/	o			WO	Low
ຫ	ຫ່ານ	[hāːn], goose	/h/	h			–	–			HO SUNG	High
ອ	ໂອ or ອື່ງ	[ʔòː], bowl or [ʔɯ̄ːŋ] frog	/ʔ/	–			–	–			O	Middle
ຮ	ເຮືອນ or ເຮືອ	[hɯ́an] house, or [hɯ́a], boat	/h/	h			–	–			HO TAM	Low

=== Consonantal digraphs and ligatures ===
Lao also uses digraphs based on combinations of the silent letter (unpronounced) ຫ ຫ່ານ with certain other consonants, some of which also have special ligature forms that are optionally used.

In the Thai script, certain consonants are preceded by tone modifiers. This is because high consonants or low consonants cannot produce the full 5 tones of Thai. For instance, tone modifier ห can turn low consonants into high ones. This also explains why the Lao script reserved consonants with the same sounds (e.g. ຂ and ຄ /kʰ/, ສ and ຊ /s/). Both high and low consonants are needed to produce full five (or six) tones of Lao.

Such design also exists in Lao. Sonorants ງ, ຍ, ນ, ມ, ລ, ວ are originally low consonants, but when they're preceded by ຫ, they become high consonants.

The older versions of the script also included special forms for combinations of ພ /pʰ/ + ຍ /ɲ/, ສ /s/ + ນ /n/, and ມ /m/ + ລ /l/. In addition, consonant clusters that had the second component of ຣ /r/ or ລ /l/ were written with a special form ◌ຼ underneath the consonant. Since these were not pronounced in Lao, they were removed during various spelling reforms, and this symbol only appears in the ligature ຫຼ.

Letter	Initial position				Unicode	Sample Word	Tone Class
Letter	IPA	BGN/PCGN	LC	RTGS	Unicode	Sample Word	Tone Class
ຫງ	/ŋ/	ng			ng	ເຫງົາ lonely	High
ຫຍ	/ɲ/	gn	ny	y	ny	ຫຍ້າ grass	High
ໜ or ຫນ	/n/	n			n	ໜູ rat	High
ໝ or ຫມ	/m/	m			m	ໝາ dog	High
ຫຼ or ຫລ	/l/	l			l	ຫຼັງ back	High
ຫວ	/w/	v	w		w	ແຫວນ ring	High

=== Phonetic ===
Lao characters in initial position (several letters appearing in the same box have identical pronunciation).

		Labial	Alveolar	Alveolo- palatal	Palatal	Velar		Glottal
		Labial	Alveolar	Alveolo- palatal	Palatal	plain	lab.	Glottal
Nasal		ມ IPA: [m]	ນ IPA: [n]		ຍ IPA: [ɲ]	ງ IPA: [ŋ]		
Plosive	voiced	ບ IPA: [b]	ດ IPA: [d]					
Plosive	voiceless	ປ IPA: [p]	ຕ IPA: [t]			ກ IPA: [k]		ອ IPA: [ʔ]
Plosive	aspirated	ຜພ IPA: [pʰ]	ຖທ IPA: [tʰ]			ຂຄ IPA: [kʰ]		
Fricative		ຝຟ IPA: [f]	ສຊ IPA: [s]			ຂຄ IPA: [x] *		ຫຮ IPA: [h]
Affricate				ຈ IPA: [tɕ]				
Trill			ຣ IPA: [r]					
Approximant		ວ IPA: [ʋ] **	ລ IPA: [l]		ຢ IPA: [j]		ວ IPA: [w] **	

^{*} In Luang Prabang dialect.
^{**} Depends on the dialect.

Lao characters in final position. In the old documents, the letter ຽ could be found in place of ຍ.

	Bilabial	Alveolar	Palatal	Velar	
	Bilabial	Alveolar	Palatal	plain	lab.
Nasal	ມ IPA: [m]	ນຣ IPA: [n]		ງ IPA: [ŋ]	
Plosive	ບ IPA: [p̚]	ດ IPA: [t̚]		ກ IPA: [k̚]	
Approximant			ຍ IPA: [j]		ວ IPA: [w]

== Vowels ==
In its earlier form, Lao would be considered a full abugida, in which the inherent vowel is embedded in the consonant letters. The 1975 spelling reform by the Lao government shallows the orthography: the main vowels are now written explicitly, but the rest of vowel diacritics still apply. However, many Lao outside of Laos, and some inside Laos, continue to write according to former spelling standards. For example, the old spelling of ສເຫຼີມ "to hold a ceremony, celebrate" contrasts with the new ສະເຫລີມ/ສະເຫຼີມ.

Vowels are constructed from only a handful of basic symbols, but they can be combined with other vowel forms and semi-vowels to represent the full repertoire of diphthongs and triphthongs used in the language. Vowels cannot stand alone or begin a syllable, so the silent consonant ອ, which can function as a vowel in its own right, is used as a base when spelling a word that begins with a vowel sound.

The names of the vowels are just as easy as saying sala (ສະຫຼະ, [sā.lāʔ]) before the vowel sign. Some vowels have unique names, and these are ໃ◌ (ໄມ້ມ້ວນ, /mâj mûan/, "rolled stem"), ໄ◌ (ໄມ້ມາຍ, /mâj máːj/, "unwound stem"), ◌ົ (ໄມ້ກົງ, . /mâj kòŋ/, "straight stem"), ◌ັ (ໄມ້ກັນ, . /mâj kàn/, "ear stem"), ◌ຽ (ວິລາມ, /wīʔ láːm/), and ◌ໍ (ນິກຄະຫິດ, /nīk kʰāʔ hǐt/).

Although a dotted circle ◌ is used on this page to represent the consonant, in standard Lao orthography a small x symbol is used for this purpose. Traditionally this was a simple, stylized, sans-serif x and it was included in Lao fonts before Unicode became widespread. Unicode does not make it available as part of the Lao alphabet set, and a lower-case sans-serif x is often used instead.

Some vowels change their forms depending on whether they appear in the final or medial position.

=== Short and long vowels ===
Short vowels							Long vowels						
Letter		IPA	BGN/PCGN	LC	RTGS	Unicode	Letter		IPA	BGN/PCGN	LC	RTGS	Unicode
Final	Medial	IPA	BGN/PCGN	LC	RTGS	Unicode	Final	Medial	IPA	BGN/PCGN	LC	RTGS	Unicode
◌ະ	◌ັ◌	/aʔ/, /a/	a			a	◌າ		/aː/	a	ā	a	aa
◌ິ		/i/	i			i	◌ີ		/iː/	i	ī	i	ii
◌ຶ		/ɯ/	u	ư	ue	y	◌ື		/ɯː/	u	ư̄	ue	yy
◌ຸ		/u/	ou	u	u	u	◌ູ		/uː/	ou	ū	u	uu
ເ◌ະ	ເ◌ັ◌	/eʔ/, /e/	é	e	e		ເ◌		/eː/	é	ē	e	e
ແ◌ະ	ແ◌ັ◌	/ɛʔ/, /ɛ/	è	æ	ae		ແ◌		/ɛː/	è	ǣ	ae	ei
ໂ◌ະ	◌ົ◌	/oʔ/, /o/	ô	o	o		ໂ◌		/oː/	ô	ō	o	o
ເ◌າະ	◌ັອ◌	/ɔʔ/, /ɔ/	o	ǫ	o		◌ໍ	◌ອ◌	/ɔː/	o	ǭ	o	
ເ◌ິ		/ɤʔ/	eu	œ	oe		ເ◌ີ		/ɤː/	eu	œ̄	oe	
ເ◌ັຍ	—	/iaʔ/	ia				ເ◌ຍ	◌ຽ◌	/ia/	ia	īa	ia	
ເ◌ຶອ	—	/ɯaʔ/	ua	ưa	uea		ເ◌ືອ		/ɯa/	ua	ư̄a	uea	
◌ົວະ	—	/uaʔ/	oua	ua	ua		◌ົວ	◌ວ◌	/ua/	oua	ūa	ua	

=== Special vowels ===
Letter	IPA	BGN/PCGN	LC	RTGS	Unicode	Old Alternative
ໄ◌, ໃ◌^{*}	/aj/	ai			ai or ay	◌ັຍ
ເ◌ົາ	/aw/	ao				◌ັວ
◌ໍາ	/am/	am				◌ັມ

^{*} In the Northern (Luang Prabang) dialect of Lao, ໃ◌ is pronounced as [aɰ] rather than [aj]; similarly, in the Northeastern (Houaphanh) dialect, ໃ◌ is pronounced as /ɯ/.

As in the neighboring Thai script, ◌ະ is used to represent a glottal stop after a vowel.

== Punctuation ==
Lao is traditionally not written with spaces between words. Spaces are reserved for ends of clauses or sentences. Periods are not used, and questions can be determined by question words in a sentence. Traditional punctuation marks include ◌໌, an obsolete mark indicating silenced consonants; ໆ, used to indicate repetition of the preceding word; ຯ, the Lao ellipsis that is also used to indicate omission of words; ฯ, a more or less obsolete symbol indicating shortened form of a phrase (such as royal names); and ฯລฯ, used to indicate et cetera.

In more contemporary writing, punctuation marks are borrowed from French, such as exclamation point !, question mark ?, parentheses (), and «» for quotation marks, although "" is also common. Hyphens (-) and the ellipsis (...) are also commonly found in modern writing.

== Numerals ==
	0	1	2	3	4	5	6	7	8	9	10	20
Lao Numerals	໐	໑	໒	໓	໔	໕	໖	໗	໘	໙	໑໐	໒໐
Lao Names	ສູນ	ໜຶ່ງ	ສອງ	ສາມ	ສີ່	ຫ້າ	ຫົກ	ເຈັດ	ແປດ	ເກົ້າ	ສິບ	ຊາວ
Thai Numerals	๐	๑	๒	๓	๔	๕	๖	๗	๘	๙	๑๐	๒๐
RTGS	sun	nueng	song	sam	si	ha	hok	chet	paet	kao	sip	sao
Transliteration	soun	nung	song	sam	si	ha	hok	chet	pèt	kao	sip	xao

== Other languages in Lao script ==
According to Article 89 of the 2003 Amended Constitution of the Lao People's Democratic Republic, the Lao alphabet, though originally used solely for transcribing the Lao language, is also used to write several minority languages.

1. Additional Lao characters used to write Pali/Sanskrit, the liturgical language of Theravāda Buddhism, are now available with the publication of Unicode 12.0. The font Lao Pali (Alpha) can be downloaded from Aksharamukha.
2. Additional Lao characters used to write Khmu' were also encoded. The script has also been adapted for Katu, while Tai-speaking groups in Viet Nam including the Tai Dam and White Tai use a similar script (called Tai Viet).
3. An older version of Lao, Tai Noi, was also used by the ethnic Lao of Thailand's Isan region before Isan was incorporated into Siam. Its use was banned by the Thai government and supplemented with the very similar Thai alphabet in 1871; however, the region remained culturally and politically distant until further government campaigns and integration into the Thai state (Thaification) were imposed in the 20th century. Attempts to encode Thai Noi in Unicode have been made.
4. The applicability of Lao script for other minority languages requires further evaluations.

Some minority languages use other writing systems. For example, the Hmong adopted the Romanized Popular Alphabet to spell the Hmong languages.

=== Pali ===
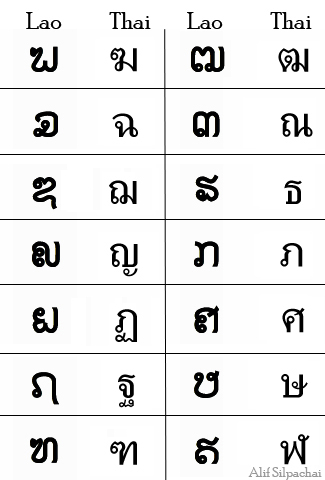
These now-obsolete Lao letters were once used to spell words of Pali and Sanskrit derivation, but were removed, reducing the consonant inventory and the similarity of spelling between Thai and Lao.

The modern Lao alphabet cannot be used to transcribe Pali, due to spelling reforms. In the 20th century, Maha Sila Viravong designed the additional characters to transcribe Pali, based on research into various epigraphic sources, including precursor characters that can be traced back to the Tai Noi script. Extended characters to support Lao Pali were added to Unicode 12 in 2019. Below are the consonant letters used for Pali, including their IAST transcriptions (the ones in gold are extended characters not found in the modern Lao alphabet). For additional details, see the Thai script page's sections for the alphabetic table and usage for Sanskrit and Pali.

ກ k	ຂ kh	ຄ g	ຆ gh	ງ ṅ
ຈ c	ຉ ch	ຊ j	ຌ jh	ຎ ñ
ຏ ṭ	ຐ ṭh	ຑ ḍ	ຒ ḍh	ຓ ṇ
ດ t	ຖ th	ທ d	ຘ dh	ນ n
ບ p	ຜ ph	ພ b	ຠ bh	ມ m
ຍ y	ຣ r	ລ l	ວ v	ສ s
	ຫ h	ຬ ḷ	ອ a	

The extended characters are listed below:

Letter	Unicode	Similar Thai Letter
ຆ	PALI GHA	ฆ
ຉ	PALI CHA	ฉ
ຌ	PALI JHA	ฌ
ຎ	PALI NYA	ญ
ຏ	PALI TTA	ฏ
ຐ	PALI TTHA	ฐ
ຑ	PALI DDA	ฑ
ຒ	PALI DDHA	ฒ
ຓ	PALI NNA	ณ
ຘ	PALI DHA	ธ
ຠ	PALI BHA	ภ
ຨ	SANSKRIT SHA	ศ
ຩ	SANSKRIT SSA	ษ
ຬ	PALI LLA	ฬ

== Lao compatible software ==
Linux has been available in Lao since 2005.

Windows did not officially support Lao until Windows Vista. User-generated fonts are freely available online.

In December 2011, the Lao Ministry of Science and Technology, in cooperation with the Ministry of Post and Telecommunications, officially authorized the use of Phetsarath OT as the standard national font.

The Phetsarath OT font was already adopted by the government in 2009; however, Lao users were unable to use it, as international software manufacturers did not include the font in their software systems. Mobile devices were not able to use or show the Lao language. Instead, mobile phone users had to rely on Thai or English as the language they used.

The Laos Ministry of Post and Telecommunications asked local technicians to develop a software system of international standard that would enable the Phetsarath OT font to be like other font systems that local users could access.

In March 2011, the Lao company XY Mobile presented the Phetsarath OT on mobile phones as well as tablet PCs using the mobile device operating system Android.

iOS supports Lao script on iPhones and iPads.

== Unicode ==
The Unicode block for the Lao script is U+0E80–U+0EFF, added in Unicode version 1.0. The first ten characters of the row U+0EDx are the Lao numerals 0 through 9. Throughout the chart, grey (unassigned) code points are shown because the assigned Lao characters intentionally match the relative positions of the corresponding Thai characters. This has created the anomaly that the Lao letter ສ is not in alphabetical order, since it occupies the same code-point as the Thai letter ส.

Lao^{[1]}^{[2]} Official Unicode Consortium code chart (PDF)
	0	1	2	3	4	5	6	7	8	9	A	B	C	D	E	F
U+0E8x		ກ	ຂ		ຄ		ຆ	ງ	ຈ	ຉ	ຊ		ຌ	ຍ	ຎ	ຏ
U+0E9x	ຐ	ຑ	ຒ	ຓ	ດ	ຕ	ຖ	ທ	ຘ	ນ	ບ	ປ	ຜ	ຝ	ພ	ຟ
U+0EAx	ຠ	ມ	ຢ	ຣ		ລ		ວ	ຨ	ຩ	ສ	ຫ	ຬ	ອ	ຮ	ຯ
U+0EBx	ະ	ັ	າ	ຳ	ິ	ີ	ຶ	ື	ຸ	ູ	຺	ົ	ຼ	ຽ		
U+0ECx	ເ	ແ	ໂ	ໃ	ໄ		ໆ		່	້	໊	໋	໌	ໍ	໎	
U+0EDx	໐	໑	໒	໓	໔	໕	໖	໗	໘	໙			ໜ	ໝ	ໞ	ໟ
U+0EEx																
U+0EFx																
Notes 1.As of Unicode version 18.0 2.Grey areas indicate non-assigned code points

== See also ==
- Romanization of Lao
- Lao Braille
- Literature of Laos
