= Jolgeh Sankhvast District =

District in North Khorasan province, Iran

Jolgeh Sankhvast District Persian: بخش جلگه سنخواست
- District
- Location within Iran
- Coordinates: 37°01′N 56°44′E
- Country: Iran
- Province: North Khorasan
- County: Jajrom
- Established: 1998
- Capital: Sankhvast

Population (2016)
  - Total: 6,881
- Time zone: UTC+3:30 (IRST)

Jolgeh Sankhvast District (Persian: بخش جلگه سنخواست) is in Jajrom County, North Khorasan province, Iran. Its capital is the city of Sankhvast.

== Demographics ==
=== Population ===
At the time of the 2006 National Census, the district's population was 7,796 in 2,074 households. The following census in 2011 counted 7,544 people in 2,253 households. The 2016 census measured the population of the district as 6,881 inhabitants in 2,201 households.

=== Administrative divisions ===
Jolgeh Sankhvast District Population
Administrative Divisions	2006	2011	2016
Chahardeh Sankhvast RD	2,257	1,970	1,761
Darband RD	3,530	3,454	3,043
Sankhvast (city)	2,009	2,120	2,077
Total	7,796	7,544	6,881
RD = Rural District
