= 8th Central Committee of the Lao People's Revolutionary Party =

The 8th Central Committee of the Lao People's Revolutionary Party (LPRP) was elected at the 8th LPRP National Congress in 2006. It was composed of 55 members.

== Members ==
Rank	Name	Akson Lao	7th CC		9th CC		Birth	Ethnicity	Gender
Rank	Name	Akson Lao	Change	Rank	Change	Rank	Birth	Ethnicity	Gender
1	Choummaly Sayasone	ຈູມມະລີ ໄຊຍະສອນ	Old	3	Re-elected	1	1936	Lowland	Male
2	Samane Vignaket	ສະໝານ ວິຍະເກດ	Old	2	Retired	—	1927	Lowland	Male
3	Thongsing Thammavong	ທອງສີງ ທໍາມະວົງ	Old	4	Re-elected	2	1944	Lowland	Male
4	Bounnhang Vorachit	ບຸນຍັງ ວໍລະຈິດ	Old	6	Re-elected	3	1937	Lowland	Male
5	Sisavath Keobounphanh	ສີສະຫວາດ ແກ້ວບຸນພັນ	Old	7	Retired	—	1928	Lowland	Male
6	Asang Laoly	ອາຊາງ ລາວລີ	Old	8	Re-elected	5	1941	Akha	Male
7	Bouasone Bouphavanh	ບົວສອນ ບູບຜາວັນ	Old	11	Not	—	1954	Lowland	Male
8	Thongloun Sisoulith	ທອງລຸນ ສີສຸລິດ	Old	9	Re-elected	6	1945	Lowland	Male
9	Douangchay Phichit	ດວງໃຈ ພິຈິດ	Old	10	Re-elected	7	1944	Lowland	Male
10	Somsavat Lengsavad	ສົມສະຫວາດ ເລັ່ງສະຫວັດ	Old	13	Re-elected	8	1945	Chinese	Male
11	Pany Yathotou	ປານີ ຢາທໍ່ຕູ້	Old	21	Re-elected	4	1951	Hmong	Female
12	Bounthong Chitmany	ບຸນທອງ ຈິດມະນີ	Old	34	Re-elected	9	1949	Lamet	Male
13	Sombat Yialiher		Old	40	Not	—	1956	Hmong	Male
14	Thongbanh Sengaphone	ທອງບັນ ແສງອາພອນ	Old	41	Re-elected	12	1953	Lowland	Male
15	Vongphet Saikeuyachongtoua		Old	12	Retired	—	1939	Hmong	Male
16	Bounheuang Douangphachanh	ດວງສະຫວັດ ສຸພານຸວົງ	Old	14	Retired	—	1945	Midland	Male
17	Onechanh Thammavong	ອ່ອນຈັນ ທຳມະວົງ	Old	15	Re-elected	19	1953	Lowland	Female
18	Chansy Phosikham	ຈັນສີ ໂພສີຄຳ	Old	17	Re-elected	13	1949	Lowland	Male
19	Phimmasone Leuangkhamma	ພິມມະສອນ ເລືອງຄຳມາ	Old	18	Re-elected	20	1943	Tai Dam	Male
20	Khampane Philavong		Old	19	Retired	—	1943	Lowland	Male
21	Somphanh Phengkhammy	ສົມພັນ ແພງຄຳມີ	Old	20	Re-elected	18	1948	Lowland	Male
22	Saysomphone Phomvihane	ໄຊສົມພອນ ພົມວິຫານ	Old	22	Re-elected	17	1954	Lowland	Male
23	Khammanh Sounvileuth	ຄຳໝັ້ນ ສູນວິເລີດ	Old	23	Re-elected	21	1952	Midland	Male
24	Mounkeo Oraboun	ໝູນແກ້ວ ອໍລະບູນ	Old	26	Retired	—	1942	Lowland	Male
25	Somphet Thipmala		Old	27	Retired	—	1940	Phuan	Male
26	Chaleun Yiapaoher	ຈະເລີນ ເຢຍປາວເຮີ	Old	30	Re-elected	22	1951	Hmong	Male
27	Soukanh Mahalath	ສຸກັນ ມະຫາລາດ	Old	31	Re-elected	14	1954	Lowland	Male
28	Soulivong Daravong	ສຸລິວົງ ດາລາວົງ	Old	32	Re-elected	23	1949	Lowland	Male
29	Bounpheng Mounphosay	ບຸນເພັງ ມູນໂພໄຊ	Old	33	Re-elected	24	1948	Phuan	Female
30	Phandouangchit Vongsa	ພັນດວງຈິດ ວົງສາ	Old	35	Re-elected	25	1947	Lowland	Male
31	Bounpone Bouttanavong	ບຸນປອນ ບຸດຕະນະວົງ	Old	36	Re-elected	10	1955	Lowland	Male
32	Khamboun Douangpanya	ຄຳບຸ່ນ ດ້ວງປັນຍາ	Old	38	Re-elected	26	1950	Lowland	Male
33	Soubanh Srithirath	ສຸບັນ ສະຣິດທິຣາດ	Old	46	Retired	—	1936	Lowland	Male
34	Chanasamone Chanyalath	ຈັນສະໝອນ ຈັນຍາລາດ	Old	48	Re-elected	27	1946	Midland	Male
35	Ponmek Dalaloy	ປອນເມກ ດາລາລອຍ	Old	49	Retired	—	1938	Lowland	Male
36	Venethong Luangvilay		Old	50	Retired	—	1946	Lowland	Male
37	Khampheuy Panmalaythong	ຄຳເຜີຍ ປານມະໄລທອງ	New	—	Re-elected	28	1958	Lowland	Male
38	Vilayvanh Phomkhe	ວິໄລວັນ ພົມເຂ	New	—	Re-elected	29	1942	Lowland	Male
39	Phankham Viphavanh	ພັນຄຳ ວິພາວັນ	New	—	Re-elected	11	1951	Lowland	Male
40	Khamsane Souvong	ຄຳສານ ສຸວົງ	New	—	Re-elected	30	1953	Phounoi	Male
41	Sinlavong Khoutphaythoune	ສິນລະວົງ ຄຸດໄພທູນ	New	—	Re-elected	31	1953	Lowland	Male
42	Sengnouan Xayalath	ແສງນວນ ໄຊຍະລາດ	New	—	Re-elected	15	1949	Lowland	Male
43	Khamphanh Phommathat	ຄຳພັນ ພົມມະທັດ	New	—	Re-elected	32	1955	Midland	Male
44	Somkot Mangnomek	ສົມກົດ ມັງໜໍ່ເມກ	New	—	Re-elected	33	1955	Lowland	Male
45	Sonexay Siphandone	ສອນໄຊ ສີພັນດອນ	New	—	Re-elected	34	1966	Lowland	Male
46	Nam Viyaketh	ນາມ ວິຍະເກດ	New	—	Re-elected	35	1958	Lowland	Male
47	Tong Yeutho	ຕົງເຢີທໍ	New	—	Re-elected	36	1946	Hmong	Male
48	Sisay Leudetmounsone	ສີໄສ ລືເດດມູນສອນ	New	—	Re-elected	37	1959	Katang	Female
49	Sanyahak Phomvihane	ສັນຍາຮັກ ພົມວິຫານ	New	—	Re-elected	38	1968	Lowland	Male
50	Cheuang Sombounkhanh	ເຈືອງ ສົມບູນຂັນ	New	—	Re-elected	16	1955	Lowland	Male
51	Kikeo Khaykhamphithoune	ກິແກ້ວ ໄຂຄຳພິທູນ	New	—	Re-elected	39	1957	Lowland	Male
52	Khambay Damlath	ຄຳໃບ ດຳລັດ	New	—	Re-elected	40	1957	Lowland	Male
53	Sinay Mienglavanh	ສີໄນ ມຽງລາວັນ	New	—	Not	—	1959	Midland	Male
54	Bosaikham Vongdara	ບໍ່ແສງຄໍາ ວົງດາລາ	New	—	Re-elected	44	1948	Lowland	Male
55	Sommad Pholsena	ສົມມາດ ພົນເສນາ	New	—	Re-elected	41	1953	Lowland	Male

== Bibliography ==
- Vithanyasaat, Sathaaban; Haeng, Sangkhom (2010). ປວັດສາດພັກປະຊາຊົນປະຕິວັດລາວ [History of Lao People’s Revolutionary Party: Brief Summary]. Vientiane, Laos: Lao Academy of Social Sciences.
- Yamada, Norihiko (2002). "第6章 ラオス人民革命党第7回大会—残された課題" [Chapter 6: The 7th National Congress of the Lao People's Revolutionary Party 7th and Challenges Ahead]. Vietnam and Laos after the 2001 National Congresses: Challenges Ahead (46). Institute of Developing Economies of the Ministry of Economy, Trade and Industry.
