= 7th Government of Laos =

- 2011–2016
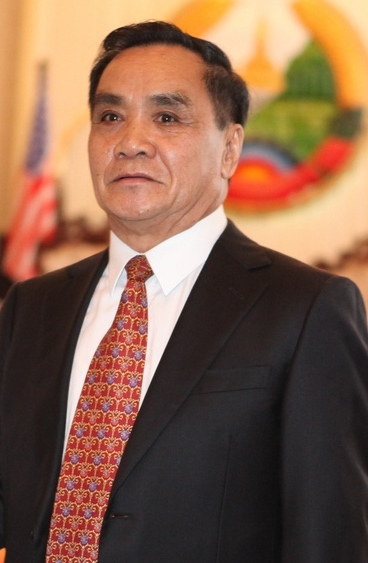
- Thongsing Thammavong
- Date formed: 15 June 2011
- Date dissolved: 20 April 2016

People and organisations
- President: Choummaly Sayasone
- Prime Minister: Thongsing Thammavong
- Deputy Prime Minister: Asang Laoli; Thongloun Sisoulith; Douangchay Phichit; Somsavat Lengsavad
- Member party: Lao People's Revolutionary Party

History
- Election: 2011 Election of Deputies
- Legislature term: 7th National Assembly
- Predecessor: Sixth
- Successor: Eighth

The Seventh Government of the Lao People's Democratic Republic was established on 15 June 2011.

== Ministries ==
Ministry	Minister	Took office	Left office
Prime Minister	Thongsing Thammavong	15 June 2011	20 April 2016
Deputy Prime Minister	Asang Laoli	15 June 2011	20 April 2016
Deputy Prime Minister	Thongloun Sisoulith	15 June 2011	20 April 2016
Deputy Prime Minister	Douangchai Phichit	15 June 2011	17 May 2014
Deputy Prime Minister	Somsavat Lengsavad	15 June 2011	20 April 2016
Deputy Prime Minister	Bounpone Bountanavong	17 May 2014	20 April 2016
Deputy Prime Minister	Phankham Viphavanh	17 May 2014	20 April 2016
Minister of Foreign Affairs	Thongloun Sisoulith	15 June 2011	20 April 2016
Minister of Defense	Douangchai Phichit	15 June 2011	17 May 2014
Minister of Defense	Sengnuan Xayalath	17 May 2014	20 April 2016
Minister of Agriculture and Forestry	Vilayvanh Phomkhe	15 June 2011	20 April 2016
Minister of Education and Sport	Phankham Viphavanh	15 June 2011	20 April 2016
Minister of Home Affairs	Xaysi Santivong	9 April 2014	8 July 2015
Minister of Home Affairs	Khammanh Sounvileuth	8 July 2015	20 April 2016
Ministry of Energy and Mining	Bosengkham Vongdara	5 June 2011	2012
Ministry of Energy and Mining	Soulivong Daravong	2012	20 April 2016
Minister of Finance	Phouphet Khamphounvong	15 June 2011	3 March 2014
Minister of Finance	Lien Thikeo	3 March 2014	20 April 2016
Minister of Industry and Commerce	Nam Viyaket	15 June 2011	June 2014
Minister of Industry and Commerce	Khemmani Pholsena	June 2014	20 April 2016
Minister of Information, Culture and Tourism	Mounkeo Orlaboun	15 June 2011	2012
Minister of Information, Culture and Tourism	Bosengkham Vongdara	2012	20 April 2016
Minister of Interior	Khampane Philavong	15 June 2011	20 April 2016
Minister of Justice	Chaleun Yiabaoher	15 June 2011	20 April 2016
Minister of Labour and Social Welfare	Onchanh Thammavong	15 June 2011	20 April 2016
Minister of Natural Resources and Environment	Noulin Sinhbandith	15 June 2011	20 April 2016
Minister of Planning and Investment	Soulivong Daravong	15 June 2011	2012
Minister of Planning and Investment	Somdy Duangdy	2012	20 April 2016
Minister of Post, Telecommunication and Communication	Hiem Phommachanh	15 June 2011	20 April 2016
Minister of Public Health	Eksavang Vongvichit	15 June 2011	20 April 2016
Minister of Public Security	Thongbanh Sengaphone	15 June 2011	17 May 2014
Minister of Public Security	Vilay Lakhamfong	17 May 2014	20 April 2016
Minister of Public Works and Transport	Sommad Pholsena	15 June 2011	20 April 2016
Minister of Science and Technology	Boviengkham Vongdara	15 June 2011	20 April 2016
Minister in the Office of the Prime Minister	Bounheuang Duangphachanh	15 June 2011	20 April 2016
Minister in the Office of the Prime Minister	Sinlavong Khoutphaythoune	15 June 2011	20 April 2016
Minister in the Office of the Prime Minister	Bounpheng Mouphosay	15 June 2011	20 April 2016
Minister in the Office of the Prime Minister	Bountiem Phitsamay	15 June 2011	20 April 2016
Minister in the Office of the Prime Minister	Khempheng Pholsena	15 June 2011	20 April 2016
Minister in the Office of the Prime Minister	Duangsavad Souphanouvong	15 June 2011	20 April 2016
Minister in the Office of the Prime Minister	Phouphet Khamphounvong	3 March 2014	20 April 2016

== Committees and others ==
Ministry	Minister	Took office	Left office
President of the State Control and Inspection	Asang Laoli	15 June 2011	20 April 2016
