= 8th Executive Committee of the Lao People's Revolutionary Party =

The 8th Executive Committee of the Lao People's Revolutionary Party (LPRP), officially the executive committee of the 8th National Congress of the Lao People's Revolutionary Party, was elected in 2006 by the 1st Plenary Session of the 8th Central Committee in 2011.

== Members ==
Rank	Name	Akson Lao	9th SEC	Birth	Gender
1	Bounnhang Vorachith	ບຸນຍັງ ວໍລະຈິດ	Reelected	1937	Male
2	Asang Laoly	ອາຊາງ ລາວລີ	Retired	1941	Male
3	Douangchay Phichit	ດວງໃຈ ພິຈິດ	Not	1944	Male
4	Bounthong Chitmany	ບຸນທອງ ຈິດມະນີ	Reelected	1949	Male
5	Sombat Yialiher		Retired	1956	Male
6	Thongban Sengaphone	ທອງບັນ ແສງອາພອນ	Reelected	1953	Male
