= 9th Central Committee of the Lao People's Revolutionary Party =

The 9th Central Committee of the Lao People's Revolutionary Party (LPRP) was elected at the 9th LPRP National Congress in 2011. It was composed of 61 members

== Members ==
Rank	Name	Akson Lao	8th CC		10th CC		Gender
Rank	Name	Akson Lao	Change	Rank	Change	Rank	Gender
1	Choummaly Sayasone	ຈູມມະລີ ໄຊຍະສອນ	Old	1	Retired	—	Male
2	Thongsing Thammavong	ທອງສິງ ທຳມະວົງ	Old	3	Retired	—	Male
3	Bounnhang Vorachit	ບຸນຍັງ ວໍລະຈິດ	Old	4	Reelected	1	Male
4	Pany Yathotou	ປານີ ຢາທໍ່ຕູ້	Old	11	Reelected	3	Female
5	Asang Laoly	ອາຊາງ ລາວລີ	Old	6	Retired	—	Male
6	Thongloun Sisoulith	ທອງລຸນ ສີສຸລິດ	Old	8	Reelected	2	Male
7	Douangchay Phichit	ດວງໃຈ ພິຈິດ	Old	9	Died	—	Male
8	Somsavat Lengsavad	ສົມສະຫວາດ ເລັ່ງສະຫວັດ	Old	10	Retired	—	Male
9	Bounthong Chitmany	ບຸນທອງ ຈິດມະນີ	Old	12	Reelected	4	Male
10	Bounpone Bouttanavong	ບຸນປອນ ບຸດຕະນະວົງ	Old	31	Reelected	16	Male
11	Phankham Viphavanh	ພັນຄຳ ວິພາວັນ	Old	39	Reelected	5	Male
12	Thongbanh Sengaphone	ທອງບັນ ແສງອາພອນ	Old	14	Died	—	Male
13	Chansy Phosikham	ຈັນສີ ໂພສີຄຳ	Old	18	Reelected	6	Male
14	Soukanh Mahalath	ສຸກັນ ມະຫາລາດ	Old	27	Died	—	Male
15	Sengnouan Xayalath	ແສງນວນ ໄຊຍະລາດ	Old	42	Reelected	12	Male
16	Cheuang Sombounkhanh	ເຈືອງ ສົມບູນຂັນ	Old	50	Died	—	Male
17	Saysomphone Phomvihane	ໄຊສົມພອນ ພົມວິຫານ	Old	22	Reelected	7	Male
18	Somphanh Phengkhammy	ສົມພັນ ແພງຄຳມີ	Old	21	Reelected	17	Male
19	Onechanh Thammavong	ອ່ອນຈັນ ທຳມະວົງ	Old	17	Retired	—	Female
20	Phimmasone Leuangkhamma	ພິມມະສອນ ເລືອງຄຳມາ	Old	19	Retired	—	Male
21	Khammanh Sounvileuth	ຄຳໝັ້ນ ສູນວິເລີດ	Old	23	Reelected	18	Male
22	Chaleun Yiapaoher	ຈະເລີນ ເຢຍປາວເຮີ	Old	26	Reelected	19	Male
23	Soulivong Daravong	ສຸລິວົງ ດາລາວົງ	Old	28	Retired	—	Male
24	Bounpheng Mounphosay	ບຸນເພັງ ມູນໂພໄຊ	Old	29	Retired	—	Female
25	Phandouangchit Vongsa	ພັນດວງຈິດ ວົງສາ	Old	30	Retired	—	Male
26	Khamboun Douangpanya	ຄຳບຸ່ນ ດ້ວງປັນຍາ	Old	32	Retired	—	Male
27	Chansamone Chanyalath	ຈັນສະໝອນ ຈັນຍາລາດ	Old	34	Reelected	8	Male
28	Khampheuy Panmalaythong	ຄຳເຜີຍ ປານມະໄລທອງ	Old	37	Retired	—	Male
29	Vilayvanh Phomkhe	ວິໄລວັນ ພົມເຂ	Old	38	Retired	—	Male
30	Khamsane Souvong	ຄຳສານ ສຸວົງ	Old	40	Reelected	20	Male
31	Sinlavong Khoutphaythoune	ສິນລະວົງ ຄຸດໄພທູນ	Old	41	Reelected	10	Male
32	Khamphanh Phommathat	ຄຳພັນ ພົມມະທັດ	Old	43	Reelected	9	Male
33	Somkot Mangnomek	ສົມກົດ ມັງໜໍ່ເມກ	Old	44	Reelected	21	Male
34	Sonexay Siphandone	ສອນໄຊ ສີພັນດອນ	Old	45	Reelected	11	Male
35	Nam Viyaketh	ນາມ ວິຍະເກດ	Old	46	Reelected	22	Male
36	Tong Yeutho	ຕົງເຢີທໍ	Old	47	Retired	—	Male
37	Sisay Leudetmounsone	ສີໄສ ລືເດດມູນສອນ	Old	48	Reelected	23	Female
38	Sanyahak Phomvihane	ສັນຍາຮັກ ພົມວິຫານ	Old	49	Died	—	Male
39	Kikeo Khaykhamphithoune	ກິແກ້ວ ໄຂຄຳພິທູນ	Old	51	Reelected	13	Male
40	Khambay Damlath	ຄຳໃບ ດຳລັດ	Old	52	Reelected	24	Male
41	Sommad Pholsena	ສົມມາດ ພົນເສນາ	Old	55	Reelected	25	Male
42	Somdy Duangdy	ສົມດີ ດວງດີ	New	—	Reelected	26	Male
43	Phouphet Khamphounvong	ພູເພັດ ຄຳພູນວົງ	New	—	Not	—	Male
44	Bosengkham Vongdara	ບໍ່ແສງຄຳ ວົງດາລາ	New	—	Reelected	27	Male
45	Lien Thikeo	ລຽນ ທິແກ້ວ	New	—	Reelected	29	Male
46	Eksavang Vongvichit	ເອກສະຫວ່າງ ວົງວິຈິດ	New	—	Reelected	29	Male
47	Khamla Lorlonsy	ຄຳຫລ້າ ລໍລອນສີ	New	—	Not	—	Male
48	Xaysi Santivong	ໄຊສີ ສັນຕິວົງ	New	—	Reelected	30	Male
49	Khampheng Saysompheng	ຄຳແພງ ໄຊສົມແພງ	New	—	Reelected	31	Male
50	Khamhoung Heuangvongsy	ຄຳຮຸ່ງ ເຮືອງວົງສີ	New	—	Not	—	Male
51	Souvone Leuangbounmy	ສຸວອນ ເລືອງບຸນມີ	New	—	Reelected	32	Male
52	Khammeung Phongthady	ຄຳເມິງ ພົງທະດີ	New	—	Reelected	33	Male
53	Somkeo Silavong	ສົມແກ້ວ ສີລາວົງ	New	—	Reelected	14	Male
54	Khamjane Vongphosy	ຄຳເຈນ ວົງໂພສີ	New	—	Reelected	34	Male
55	Pan Noymany	ປ້ານ ນ້ອຍມະນີ	New	—	Reelected	35	Male
56	Soukkongseng Saignaleuth	ສຸກກົງແສງ ໄຊຍະເລີດ	New	—	Reelected	36	Male
57	Khamphanh Sitthidampha	ຄຳພັນ ສິດທິດຳພາ	New	—	Reelected	37	Male
58	Khamla Lingnasone	ຄຳຫລ້າ ລີ້ງນະສອນ	New	—	Not	—	Male
59	Khampheuy Bouddavieng	ຄຳເຜີຍ ບຸດດາວຽງ	New	—	Reelected	38	Male
60	Sounthone Xayachack	ສູນທອນ ໄຊຍະຈັກ	New	—	Reelected	39	Female
61	Thongloy Silivong	ທອງລອຍ ສິລິວົງ	New	—	Reelected	40	Male
