= Permanent Member of the Lao People's Revolutionary Party Central Committee's Secretariat =

Lao People's Revolutionary Party position

Permanent Member of the Party Central Committee's Secretariat
- Emblem of the Lao People's Revolutionary Party
- Incumbent; Vilay Lakhamfong since 8 January 2026
- Secretariat of the Lao People's Revolutionary Party
- Style: Comrade
- Type: Permanent secretary
- Member of: Central Committee, Political Bureau and the Secretariat
- Reports to: Central Committee
- Seat: Headquarters of the Party Central Committee; Vientiane
- Appointer: Political Bureau
- Term length: Five years, renewable
- Constituting instrument: Charter of the Lao People's Revolutionary Party
- Inaugural holder: Bounnhang Vorachit
- Formation: 20 years and 91 days
- Unofficial names: Standing Member; Executive Secretary

The Permanent Member of the Lao People's Revolutionary Party Central Committee's Secretariat, informally the Permanent Member of the Secretariat, is a senior position within the Lao People's Revolutionary Party.

== Officeholders ==
Permanent Members of the Party Central Committee's Secretariat
No.	Portrait	Name	Took office	Left office	Duration	Electoral term	Birth	Death	Ref.
1		Bounnhang Vorachit	8 June 2006	21 January 2016	9 years and 227 days	8th CC–9th CC (2006–2016)	1937	Alive	
2		Phankham Viphavanh	21 January 2016	15 January 2021	4 years and 360 days	10th CC (2016–2021)	1951	Alive	
3		Bounthong Chitmany	15 January 2021	8 January 2026	4 years and 358 days	11th CC (2021–2026)	1949	Alive	
4		Vilay Lakhamfong	8 January 2026	Incumbent	5 years and 235 days	12th CC (2026–2031)		Alive	
