= 9th Politburo of the Lao People's Revolutionary Party =

The 9th Politburo of the Lao People's Revolutionary Party (LPRP), officially the Political Bureau of the 9th National Congress of the Lao People's Revolutionary Party, was elected in 2011 at the 1st Plenary Session of the 9th Central Committee.

9th-ranked member Saysomphone Phomvihane is the son of former LPRP General Secretary Kaysone Phomvihane.

== Members ==
Rank	Name	Akson Lao	8th POL	10th POL	Birth	Gender
1	Choummaly Sayasone	ຈູມມະລີ ໄຊຍະສອນ	Old	Retired	1936	Male
2	Thongsing Thammavong	ທອງສິງ ທຳມະວົງ	Old	Retired	1944	Male
3	Bounnhang Vorachith	ບຸນຍັງ ວໍລະຈິດ	Old	Reelected	1938	Male
4	Pany Yathotou	ປານີ ຢາທໍ່ຕູ້	Old	Reelected	1951	Female
5	Asang Laoly	ອາຊາງ ລາວລີ	Old	Retired	1941	Male
6	Thongloun Sisoulith	ທອງລຸນ ສີສຸລິດ	Old	Reelected	1945	Male
7	Douangchay Phichit	ດວງໃຈ ພິຈິດ	Old	Died	1944	Male
8	Somsavat Lengsavad	ສົມສະຫວາດ ເລັ່ງສະຫວັດ	Old	Retired	1945	Male
9	Bounthong Chitmany	ບຸນທອງ ຈິດມະນີ	New	Reelected	1949	Male
10	Bounpone Bouttanavong	ບຸນປອນ ບຸດຕະນະວົງ	New	Retired	1955	Male
11	Phankham Viphavanh	ພັນຄຳ ວິພາວັນ	New	Reelected	1951	Male
