= 9th Secretariat of the Lao People's Revolutionary Party =

The 9th Secretariat of the Lao People's Revolutionary Party (LPRP), officially the Secretariat of the 9th National Congress of the Lao People's Revolutionary Party, was elected in 2011 by the 1st Plenary Session of the 9th Central Committee in 2011.

== Members ==
Rank	Name	Akson Lao	8th EXE	10th SEC	Birth	Gender
1	Choummaly Sayasone	ຈູມມະລີ ໄຊຍະສອນ	New	Retired	1936	Male
2	Bounnhang Vorachith	ບຸນຍັງ ວໍລະຈິດ	Old	Reelected	1937	Male
3	Bounthong Chitmany	ບຸນທອງ ຈິດມະນີ	New	Reelected	1949	Male
4	Bounpone Bouttanavong	ບຸນປອນ ບຸດຕະນະວົງ	New	Retired	1955	Male
5	Thongban Sengaphone	ທອງບັນ ແສງອາພອນ	Old	Died	1953	Male
6	Chansy Phosikham	ຈັນສີ ໂພສີຄຳ	New	Reelected	1948	Male
7	Soukanh Mahalath	ສຸກັນ ມະຫາລາດ	New	Retired	1954	Male
8	Sengnouan Xayalath	ແສງນວນ ໄຊຍະລາດ	New	Reelected	1949	Male
9	Cheuang Sombounkhanh	ເຈືອງ ສົມບູນຂັນ	New	Retired	1955	Male
