= 8th Politburo of the Lao People's Revolutionary Party =

The 8th Politburo of the Lao People's Revolutionary Party (LPRP), officially the Political Bureau of the 8th Central Committee of the Lao People's Revolutionary Party, was elected in 2006 by the 1st Plenary Session of the 8th Central Committee, in the immediate aftermath of the 8th National Congress.

== Members ==
Rank	Name	Akson Lao	7th POL	9th POL	Birth	Gender
1	Choummaly Sayasone	ຈູມມະລີ ໄຊຍະສອນ	Old	Reelected	1936	Male
2	Samane Vignaket	ສະໝານ ວິຍະເກດ	Old	Retired	1927	Male
3	Thongsing Thammavong	ທອງສີງ ທໍາມະວົງ	Old	Reelected	1944	Male
4	Bounnhang Vorachit	ບຸນຍັງ ວໍລະຈິດ	Old	Reelected	1937	Male
5	Sisavath Keobounphanh	ສີສະຫວາດ ແກ້ວບຸນພັນ	Old	Retired	1928	Male
6	Asang Laoly	ອາຊາງ ລາວລີ	Old	Reelected	1941	Male
7	Bouasone Bouphavanh	ບົວສອນ ບູບຜາວັນ	Old	Not	1954	Male
8	Thongloun Sisoulith	ທອງລຸນ ສີສຸລິດ	Old	Reelected	1945	Male
9	Douangchay Phichit	ດວງໃຈ ພິຈິດ	Old	Reelected	1944	Male
10	Somsavat Lengsavad	ສົມສະຫວາດ ເລັ່ງສະຫວັດ	New	Reelected	1945	Male
11	Pany Yathotou	ປານີ ຢາທໍ່ຕູ້	New	Reelected	1951	Female
