= 7th Politburo of the Lao People's Revolutionary Party =

The 7th Politburo of the Lao People's Revolutionary Party (LPRP), officially the Political Bureau of the 7th Central Committee of the Lao People's Revolutionary Party, was elected in 2001 by the 1st Plenary Session of the 7th Central Committee, in the immediate aftermath of the 7th National Congress.

== Members ==
Rank	Name	Akson Lao	6th POL	8th POL	Birth	Gender
1	Khamtai Siphandon	ຄຳໄຕ ສີພັນດອນ	Old	Retired	1924	Male
2	Samane Vignaket	ສະໝານ ວິຍະເກດ	Old	Reelected	1927	Male
3	Choummaly Sayasone	ຈູມມະລີ ໄຊຍະສອນ	Old	Reelected	1936	Male
4	Thongsing Thammavong	ທອງສີງ ທໍາມະວົງ	Old	Reelected	1944	Male
5	Osakanh Thammatheva	ໂອສະກັນ ທໍາມະເທວາ	Old	Died	1936	Male
6	Bounnhang Vorachit	ບຸນຍັງ ວໍລະຈິດ	Old	Reelected	1937	Male
7	Sisavath Keobounphanh	ສີສະຫວາດ ແກ້ວບຸນພັນ	Old	Reelected	1928	Male
8	Asang Laoly	ອາຊາງ ລາວລີ	Old	Reelected	1941	Male
9	Thongloun Sisoulith	ທອງລຸນ ສີສຸລິດ	New	Reelected	1945	Male
10	Douangchay Phichit	ດວງໃຈ ພິຈິດ	New	Reelected	1944	Male
11	Bouasone Bouphavanh	ບົວສອນ ບູບຜາວັນ	New	Reelected	1954	Male
