= 10th Secretariat of the Lao People's Revolutionary Party =

The 10th Secretariat of the Lao People's Revolutionary Party, officially the Secretariat of the 10th National Congress of the Lao People's Revolutionary Party, was elected at the 1st Plenary Session of the 10th Central Committee in the immediate aftermath of the 10th National Congress in 2016.

== Members ==
Rank	Name	Akson Lao	9th SEC	11th SEC	Birth	Gender
1	Bounnhang Vorachit	ບຸນຍັງ ວໍລະຈິດ	Old	Retired	1937	Male
2	Bounthong Chitmany	ບຸນທອງ ຈິດມະນີ	Old	Reelected	1949	Male
3	Phankham Viphavanh	ພັນຄຳ ວິພາວັນ	New	Not	1951	Male
4	Chansy Phosikham	ຈັນສີ ໂພສີຄຳ	Old	Retired	1948	Male
5	Khamphan Phommathat	ຄຳພັນ ພົມມະທັດ	New	Reelected	1955	Male
6	Sengnouan Xayalath	ແສງນວນ ໄຊຍະລາດ	Old	Retired	1949	Male
7	Kikeo Khaykhamphithoune	ກິແກ້ວ ໄຂຄຳພິທູນ	New	Not	1957	Male
8	Somkeo Silavong	ສົມແກ້ວ ສີລາວົງ	New	Retired	19??	Male
9	Vilay Lakhamfong	ວິໄລ ຫລ້າຄຳຟອງ	New	Retired	19??	Male
