= Chansy Phosikham =

Laotian politician

Head of the LPRP Central Committee Organisation Commission

11th term
- In office 15 January – 2 February 2021
- General Secretary: Thongloun Sisoulith
- Succeeded by: Sisay Leudetmounsone

10th term
- In office 22 January 2016 – 15 January 2011
- General Secretary: Bounnhang Vorachit

9th term
- In office 21 March 2011 – 22 January 2016
- General Secretary: Choummaly Sayasone

8th term
- In office 2010 – 21 March 2011
- General Secretary: Choummaly Sayasone
- Preceded by: Bounthong Chitmany

Minister of Finance

6th term
- In office 8 June 2006 – 3 July 2007
- Prime Minister: Bouasone Bouphavanh
- Succeeded by: Somdy Duangdy

5th term
- In office 1 February 2003 – 8 June 2006
- Prime Minister: Bounnhang Vorachith
- Preceded by: Soukanh Mahalath

Governor of the Central Bank
- In office 25 April 2002 – 1 February 2003
- Prime Minister: Bounnhang Vorachith
- Preceded by: Phoupheth Khamphounevong
- Succeeded by: Phoumy Thipphavone

Personal details
- Born: 13 March 1948 (age 78) Luang Prabang Province, Laos
- Party: Lao People's Revolutionary Party
- Occupation: Politician

Chansy Phosikham (Lao: ຈັນສີ ໂພສີຄຳ; born 13 March 1948) is a Laotian politician and member of the Lao People's Revolutionary Party (LPRP). He was born in 1948 in Luang Prabang Province, and served as a Deputy Governor and Governor of Luang Prabang Province. He was later appointed Governor of the National Bank in 2002, then appointed Minister of Finance in January 2003 and later serving as Governor Viang Chan Municipality.

He was elected to the LPRP Central Committee at the 5th National Congress and retained his seat until the 11th National Congress. At the 9th National Congress he was elected to the LPRP Politburo and the LPRP Secretariat, and he retained his seat in both organs until the 11th National Congress.
