= 6th Politburo of the Lao People's Revolutionary Party =

The 6th Politburo of the Lao People's Revolutionary Party (LPRP), officially the Political Bureau of the 6th Central Committee of the Lao People's Revolutionary Party, was elected in 1996 by the 1st Plenary Session of the 6th Central Committee, in the immediate aftermath of the 6th National Congress.

== Members ==
Rank	Name	Akson Lao	5th POL	7th POL	Birth	Gender
1	Khamtai Siphandon	ຄຳໄຕ ສີພັນດອນ	Old	Reelected	1924	Male
2	Samane Vignaket	ສະໝານ ວິຍະເກດ	Old	Reelected	1927	Male
3	Choummaly Sayasone	ຈູມມະລີ ໄຊຍະສອນ	Old	Reelected	1936	Male
4	Oudom Khattigna	ອຸດົມ ຂັດຕິຍະ	Old	Died	1930	Male
5	Thongsing Thammavong	ທອງສີງ ທໍາມະວົງ	Old	Reelected	1944	Male
6	Osakanh Thammatheva	ໂອສະກັນ ທໍາມະເທວາ	New	Reelected	1936	Male
7	Bounnhang Vorachit	ບຸນຍັງ ວໍລະຈິດ	New	Reelected	1937	Male
8	Sisavath Keobounphanh	ສີສະຫວາດ ແກ້ວບຸນພັນ	New	Reelected	1928	Male
9	Asang Laoly	ອາຊາງ ລາວລີ	New	Reelected	1941	Male
