= Viengthong Siphandone =

Laotian politician

- ວຽງທອງ ສີພັນດອນ
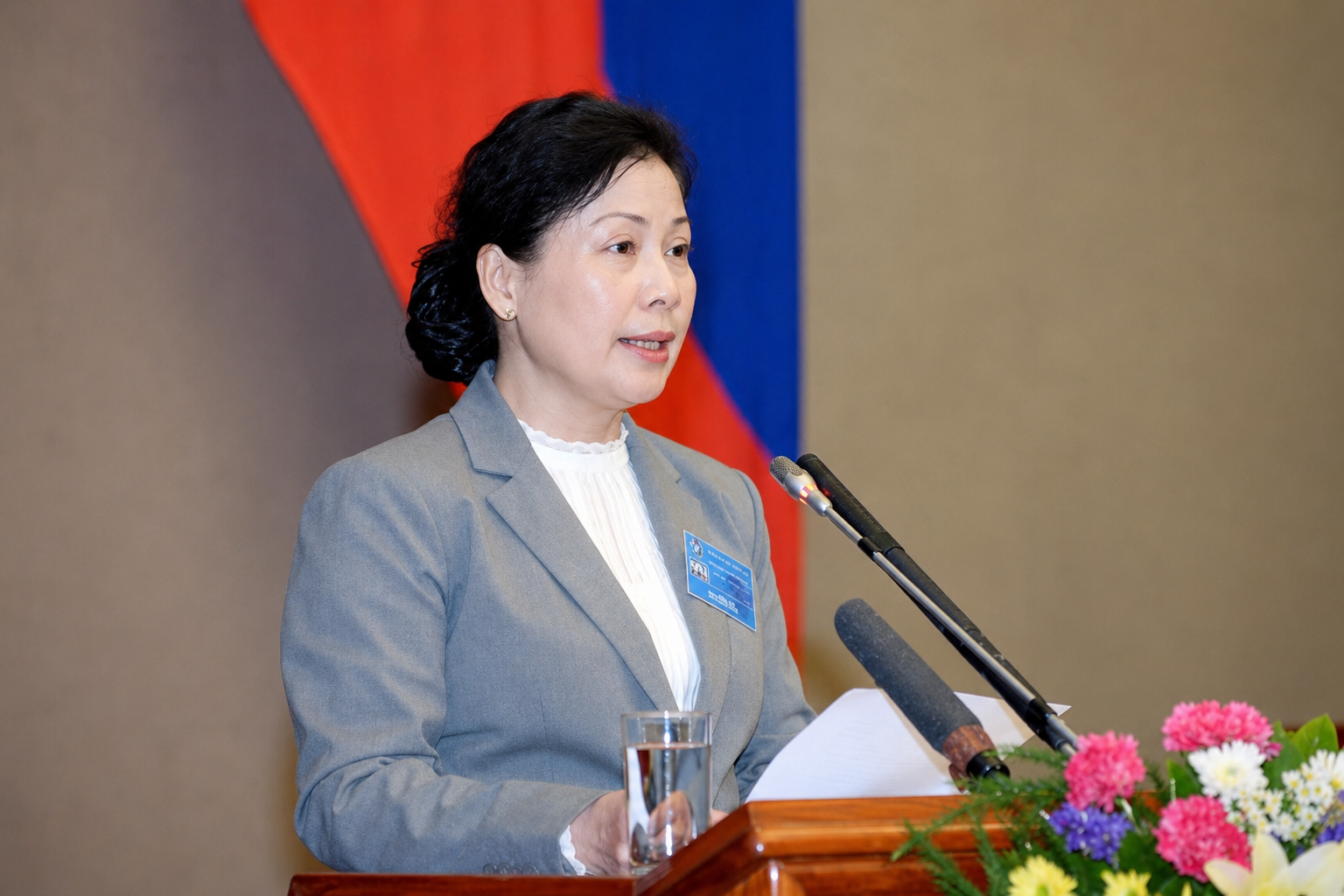
- Siphandone in 2026

7th Vice President of Laos
- Incumbent
- Assumed office 23 March 2026
- President: Thongloun Sisoulith
- Preceded by: Pany Yathotou; Bounthong Chitmany

Personal details
- Party: LPRP

Viengthong Siphandone (Lao: ວຽງທອງ ສີພັນດອນ) is a Laotian politician and member of the Lao People's Revolutionary Party (LPRP). She is the daughter of former LPRP Chairman Khamtai Siphandone and sister of Sonexay Siphandone. She currently serves as Vice President of Laos. She formerly served as President of the People's Supreme Court of Laos.

She was elected to the LPRP Central Committee at the 10th National Congress, and to the LPRP Secretariat at the 11th National Congress.

She is married to Khampheng Saysompheng.

== Political career ==
Viengthong Siphandone has held a succession of senior leadership positions in the Lao government and the Lao People's Revolutionary Party. She served as President of the State Audit Organization, where she oversaw the auditing of government agencies, state-owned enterprises, and public finances. During her tenure, the organization strengthened financial oversight, transparency, and accountability across public institutions.

She was later appointed President of the People's Supreme Court, the highest judicial authority in Laos. In this role, she supervised judicial administration, promoted legal reforms, enhanced professional standards within the judiciary, and contributed to improving the rule of law and judicial efficiency. Within the Lao People's Revolutionary Party, she has served as:

- Member of the LPRP Central Committee.
- Member of the Party Secretariat.
- Senior policymaker involved in governance, legal affairs, and institutional development.

Following the 12th National Congress of the LPRP and subsequent constitutional appointments, she was elected Vice President of the Lao People's Democratic Republic in March 2026. In this capacity, she assists the President in carrying out constitutional duties, represents the country at major domestic and international events, and supports national policy implementation.
