= 9th National Congress of the Lao People's Revolutionary Party =

9th Congress of the Lao People's Revolutionary Party
- Date: 17–21 March 2011 (5 days)
- Participants: 576 delegates (of which 56 were members of the 8th Central Committee)
- Outcome: The election of the 9th Central Committee

The 9th Congress of the Lao People's Revolutionary Party (LPRP) was held in Vientiane from 17–21 March 2011. The congress occurs once every five years. A total of 576 delegates represented the party's 191,700 card-carrying members.

== Proceedings ==
=== Day 1 (17 March) ===
Before the congress, delegates paid tribute to Kaysone Phomvihane, the former leader of the LPRP, and to express their gratitude to a man they believe laid the foundation for the party's revolutionary ideological foundation and as their national liberation hero. The former LPRP leader, Khamtai Siphandon, attended the 9th Congress as one of the delegates. The 576 delegates attended the opening of the 9th Congress on 17 March 2011. The 9th Congress was held under the theme, "Enhancing the cohesive solidarity of the Lao nation and unity within the Party; upholding the leadership role and capacity of the Party; devising a breakthrough approach for the implementation of the renovation policy; creating a solid basis for lifting the nation from underdevelopment by 2020; and advancing further towards the destination of socialism".

Thongsing Thammavong, the Prime Minister of Laos, opened the proceedings stating that the delegates would study and adopt the 9th Political Report and the new five-year plan for socio-economic development. Following Thongsing's speech, Bounthong Chitmany, the Head of the Personnel Committee of the Party Central Committee, reported on the qualifications of the delegates. Then, at last, party General Secretary and state President Choummaly Sayasone delivered the draft of the 9th Political Report, and talked of the achievements which were made since the 8th Congress (held in March 2006).

Both Choummaly and Thongsing were optimistic of the future, with Choummaly stating that the key for Lao industrialization lay in taking the appropriate steps, by prioritizing sectors which have most potential; "We give priority to the processing of agriculture and forest products and energy development, including hydropower, in parallel with forestry protection and alternative energy". As decided by the congress, the 7th five-year plan (2011–2016) targets growth of at least 8 per cent per year, to reach a national per capita income of US$1,700, increasing rice production to 4.2 million tonnes and tourist arrivals of 2.8 million by 2015, reduce family poverty levels to less than 10 percent and eliminate illiteracy among ethnic people aged 15–24 years.

=== Day 2–3 (18–19 March) ===
The second and third day were spent on speeches by representatives from different sectors on the achievements which were made during the previous five-years. The most notable speeches (on the second day) were held by Sonxay Siphandone, the Secretary and Governor of Champassak province, Mounkeo Oraboun, the Minister of Information and Culture, Minister of Finance Somdy Duangdy, Phankham Viphavanh, the Secretary of the Ministry of Education, Lien Thikeo, the party Secretary and Governor of Xayaboury province, party Secretary and Governor of Bokeo province Khamman Sounvileud, Somkot Mangnomek, the party Secretary and Governor of Xieng Khuang province, Sisay Leudetmounsone, the President of the Lao Women's Union, and finally Khamjane Vongphosy, the party Secretary and Governor of Phongsaly province. On the 3-day, the speakers who represented the business sector talked, and a model family who developed an agricultural-based business spoke to the delegates. The Lao People's Revolutionary Youth Union, Lao Women's Union and the Federation of Trade Unions extended their best wishes to the LPRP, its 9th Congress and its upcoming resolutions.

=== Day 4 (20 March) ===
During day 4, the delegates elected the 9th Central Committee, the ruling organ of the LPRP and the one which is responsible for supervising national development until the next congress, and the General Secretary. Bounthong Chithmany, the Head of the LPRP's Organization Committee, informed the delegates of the qualifications of the candidates to the 9th Central Committee before voting began. Later, in the afternoon, Douangchay Phichith appointed a 25-member ballot committee which was responsible for counting the votes. Of the 69 candidates, 61 were elected to the 9th Central Committee. Of the 9th Central Committee members, 39 per cent of them were over the age of 60, while 57 per cent of them were aged between 45 and 59. The oldest member is 75, while the youngest is 42. Almost 36 per cent of committee members hold a doctorate degree.

=== Day 5 (21 March) ===
The newly elected 9th Central Committee convened for its 1st plenum on 21 March to elect the party's 9th Politburo and 9th Secretariat. Two members from the 8th Politburo retired (these were Sisavat Keobounphanh and Saman Vinhaket). The 9th Politburo was composed of 11-members, while the 9th Secretariat contained 9-members. Bounthong Chitmany was elected the Chairman of the party's Inspection Committee. Choummaly was unanimously reelected the party's General Secretary. The 1st plenum approved the resolution of the 9th Congress, that is, the 7th five-year plan for socio-economic development and in general, the goals targeted the next five years.

Choummaly closed the 9th Congress with a speech. In it, he expressed thanks to guests, party members, senior officials, combatants, national heroes and organizations in general for their contribution to the success of the congress. He further went on to thank the Chinese Communist Party (CCP), the Communist Party of Vietnam (CPV) and friendly parties in general for their congratulatory messages and good wishes.

== Acknowledgement ==
According to the Chinese state-owned Xinhua News Agency, Hu Jintao, the General Secretary of the Chinese Communist Party at the time, congratulated Choummaly on his reelection, and noted that the LPRP under collective leadership had achieved "steady progress in socialist construction and reform, with its society harmonious and stable, economy rapidly developing, people's livelihood improving and its international status steadily enhanced." The CPV's 10th Central Committee, on behalf of the Vietnamese people, congratulated the LPRP on its successful holding of the 9th Congress, and stated that "The successes reaffirm the correct and creative policy of the LPRP, a party unyielding to all difficulties and challenges, striving for the goal of national independence, for a strong and rich country and for its people's happiness, for peace, national independence, democracy and social progress in the world." Raúl Castro, the First Secretary of the Communist Party of Cuba's (PCC) 5th Central Committee, congratulated Sayasone's reelection to the general secretaryship, and he reiterated the PCC's intentions of "strengthening the historic and fraternal brotherly relations between our parties and peoples". The 13th Central Committee of the Communist Party of the Russian Federation sent a congratulatory message to the participants of the 9th Congress, which stated "The Party Central Committee of the Communist Party of the Russian Federation would like to wholeheartedly congratulate all the delegates of the 9th Congress of the Lao People's Revolutionary Party and Lao communists across the country [...] We would like to wish the Lao People's Revolutionary Party, communists, and the entire Lao nation success in achieving new accomplishments in building socialism."
