= 10th National Congress of the Lao People's Revolutionary Party =

5 yearly congress

- Date: 18–22 January 2016 (5 days)
- Participants: 685 delegates (of which 56 were members of the 8th Central Committee)
- Outcome: The election of the 10th Central Committee

The 10th National Congress of the Lao People's Revolutionary Party (LPRP, Lao: ກອງປະຊຸມໃຫຍ່ ຄັ້ງທີ X ຂອງພັກ) was held in Vientiane from 18–22 January 2016. The congress occurs once every five years. A total of 685 delegates represented the party's 252,879 card-carrying members.

== 10th CC plenary session ==
The 1st Plenary Session of the 10th Central Committee elected the 10th Politburo and the 10th Secretariat. 11 people were elected to the Politburo, and nine to the Secretariat. It elected Bounnhang Vorachith LPRP General Secretary, Phankham Viphavan as Executive Secretary of the Secretariat and Bounthong Chitmany as Chairman of the Inspection Committee. Former General Secretary Choummaly Sayasone stepped down alongside former Politburo members Thongsing Thammavong, Asang Laoly and Somsavat Lengsavad. Bounnhang closed the proceedings by remarking that the elected members were qualified since most of them had been active participants in the war of national liberation.

Symbol	Meaning
♀	Indicates that the individual is female.
§	Indicates that the individual is military personnel.

#	Politburo members	Secretariat members	DPSC members
1.	Bounnhang Vorachith	Bounnhang Vorachith	Bounnhang Vorachith
2.	Thongloun Sisoulith	Bounthong Chitmany	—
3.	♀Pany Yathotou	Phankham Viphavan	—
4.	Bounthong Chitmany	Chansy Phosikham	—
5.	Phankham Viphavan	Khamphanh Phommathat	—
6.	Chansy Phosikham	§Sengnouane Xayalath	—
7.	Xaysomphone Phomvihane	Kikeo Khaykhamphithoune	—
8.	§Chansamone Chanyalath	§Somkeo Silavong	—
9.	Khamphanh Phommathat	§Vilay Lakhamfong	—
10.	Sinlavong Khoutphaythoune	—	—
11.	Sonesay Siphandone	—	—

== Topics of Discussion ==
Among topics discussed were ending fiscal misappropriation and attracting foreign investment. Presented at the Congress were

1. the 8th National Socio-Economic Development Plan, which strives to remove Laos from the list of the world's most underdeveloped countries by 2020,
2. the socio-economic development strategy for 2016-2025,
3. the 2030 vision report, and
4. the Party statutes.

It also hopes to further bolster Laos by developing it into an upper-middle income state by 2030.
