= Permanent Member of the Secretariat =

Permanent Member of the Secretariat may refer to:

- Permanent Member of the Lao People's Revolutionary Party Central Committee's Secretariat, an internal office within the Central Committee of the Lao People's Revolutionary Party
- Permanent Member of the Communist Party of Vietnam Central Committee's Secretariat, an internal office within the Central Committee of the Communist Party of Vietnam
