= 9th Politburo =

9th Politburo may refer to:

- 9th Politburo of the Chinese Communist Party
- Politburo of the 9th Congress of the Russian Communist Party (Bolsheviks)
- 9th Politburo of the Lao People's Revolutionary Party
- 9th Politburo of the Communist Party of Vietnam
- 9th Politburo of the Workers' Party of Korea
- 9th Politburo of the League of Communists of Yugoslavia
