= 5th Politburo =

5th Politburo may refer to:

- 5th Politburo of the Chinese Communist Party
- 5th Politburo of the Communist Party of Cuba
- 5th Politburo of the Lao People's Revolutionary Party
- 5th Politburo of the Communist Party of Vietnam
- 5th Politburo of the Communist Party of Yugoslavia
- 5th Political Committee of the Workers' Party of Korea
