= Pany Yathotou =

Laotian politician

- ປານີ ຢາທໍ່ຕູ້
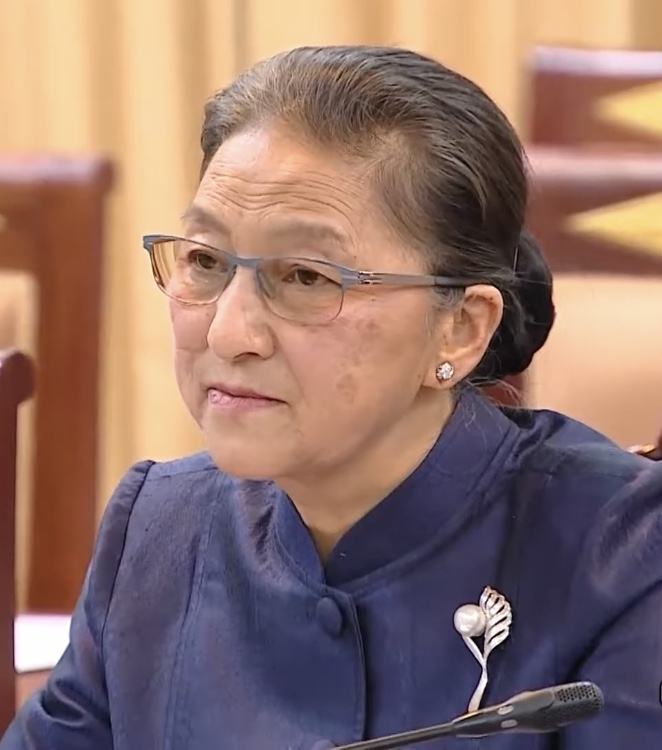
- Yathotou in 2019

Vice President of Laos
- In office 22 March 2021 – 23 March 2026 Serving with Bounthong Chitmany
- President: Thongloun Sisoulith
- Preceded by: Phankham Viphavanh
- Succeeded by: Viengthong Siphandone

President of the National Assembly
- In office 23 December 2010 – 22 March 2021
- Preceded by: Thongsing Thammavong
- Succeeded by: Saysomphone Phomvihane

Personal details
- Born: 18 February 1951 (age 75) Samchae Village, Nong Het district, Xieng Khouang Province, Laos, French Indochina
- Party: LPRP
- Parent: Ya Tho Thu (father)

Pany Yathotou (Lao: ປານີ ຢາທໍ່ຕູ້; born 18 February 1951) is a Laotian politician and member of the Lao People's Revolutionary Party.

She was the chairwoman and governor of the Bank of the Lao P.D.R., the country's central bank, from 1988 until 1997. Yathotou later joined the National Assembly in 1998. She served as the President of the National Assembly of Laos from 2010 to 2021. Yathotou is a part of Laos' Hmong ethnicity. She is the first woman to be elected as Vice President of Laos.

== Early life ==
Yathotou was born on 18 February 1951 in Xiangkhouang Province. Her father, Ya Tho Thu, was a Hmong military commander in the Pathet Lao. In 1959, she moved to North Vietnam where she studied primary and secondary school, and in 1975, she graduated with a bachelor's degree in finance from Hanoi.

== Political career ==
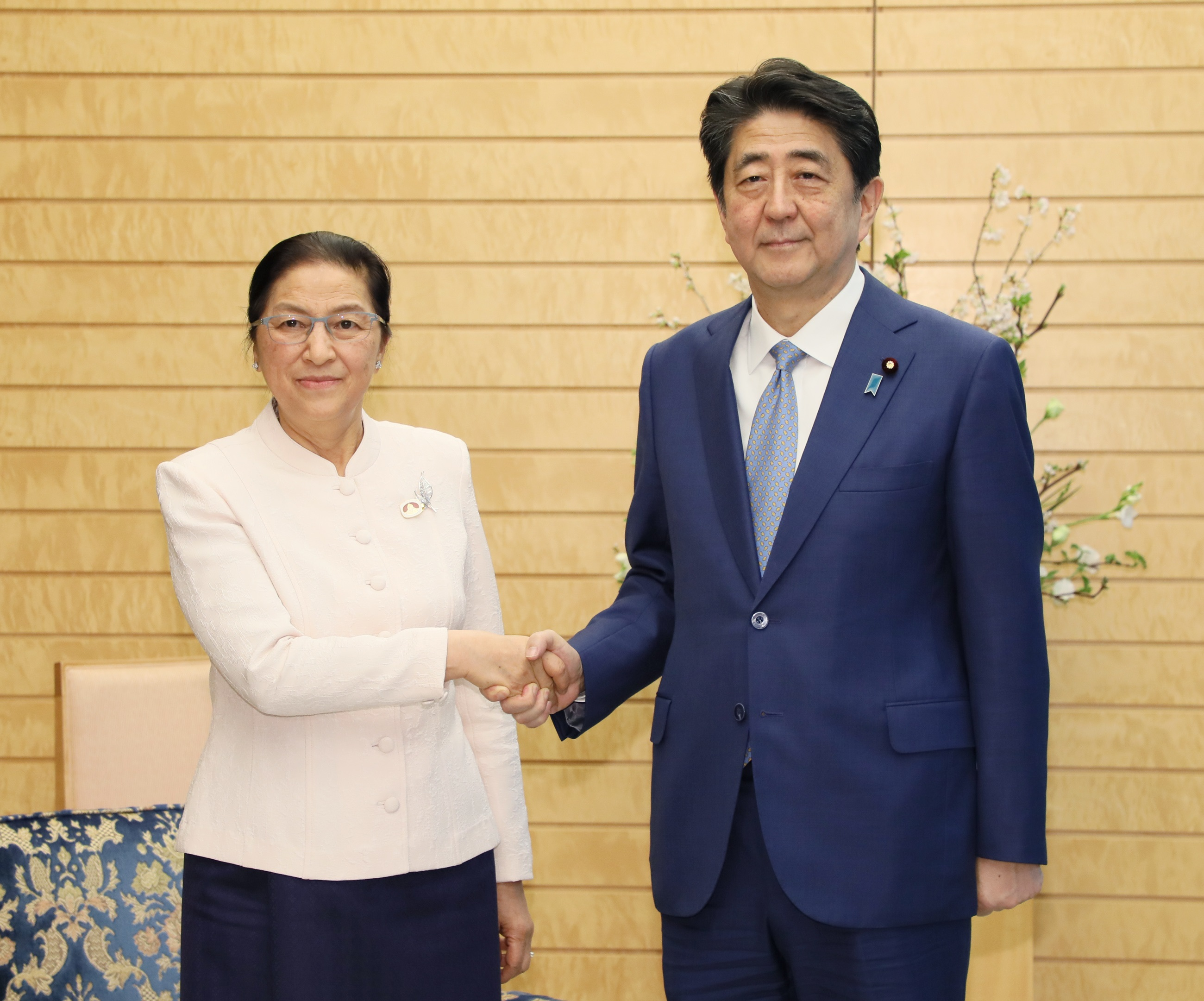
Yathotou meeting with Prime Minister of Japan Shinzo Abe, 2019

After her return to Laos, she joined the Vientiane Foreign Trade Bank in 1976 as the deputy director of the bank's budget department. She later joined the Bank of the Lao P.D.R. and in 1977, she was appointed as the deputy director of the bank's training center and in 1978, appointed as the deputy director of the foreign exchange bureau. In 1979, she joined the Lao People's Revolutionary Party and in 1980, she became the director of the foreign exchange bureau.

From 1982 to 1983, she served as the director of the economic planning bureau and from 1983 to 1985, director of the investment and construction bureau.

In 1986, Yanthou took office as the deputy governor of the Central Bank of Laos and was elected as an alternate member of the Central Committee of the Lao People's Revolutionary Party at the Fourth National Congress of the Lao People's Revolutionary Party held in November of the same year. She was promoted to the Party Central Committee at the Fifth National Congress of the Lao People's Revolutionary Party held in March 1999, and served as the governor of the central bank twice from 1988 to 1992 and from 1995 to 1997, after which she joined the government.

Yanthou was re-elected to the Party Central Committee at the Sixth National Congress of the Lao People's Revolutionary Party held in March 1996 and at the Seventh National Congress of the Lao People's Revolutionary Party held in March 2001. On the same year, she was elected as a representative of the Fourth National Congress, and was appointed to the Standing Committee of the National Congress and director of the Nationalities Committee of the National Congress when she became a representative of the National Congress in February 1998. She was successfully re-elected in the congressional representative election in February 2002 and was promoted to the vice chairman of Congress in April of the same year.

In March 2006, the Eighth National Congress of the Lao People's Revolutionary Party was held and she was re-elected as a member of the Party Central Committee, becoming the first female member of the Political Bureau of the Lao People's Revolutionary Party Central Committee and the first Hmong member. In April 2006, she took part in the election of the Sixth National Congress again, and was elected in the provincial constituency of Bolikhamxay. At the same time when she took office as the representative of the Sixth National Congress on 8 June of that year, she was re-elected as vice president of the congress.

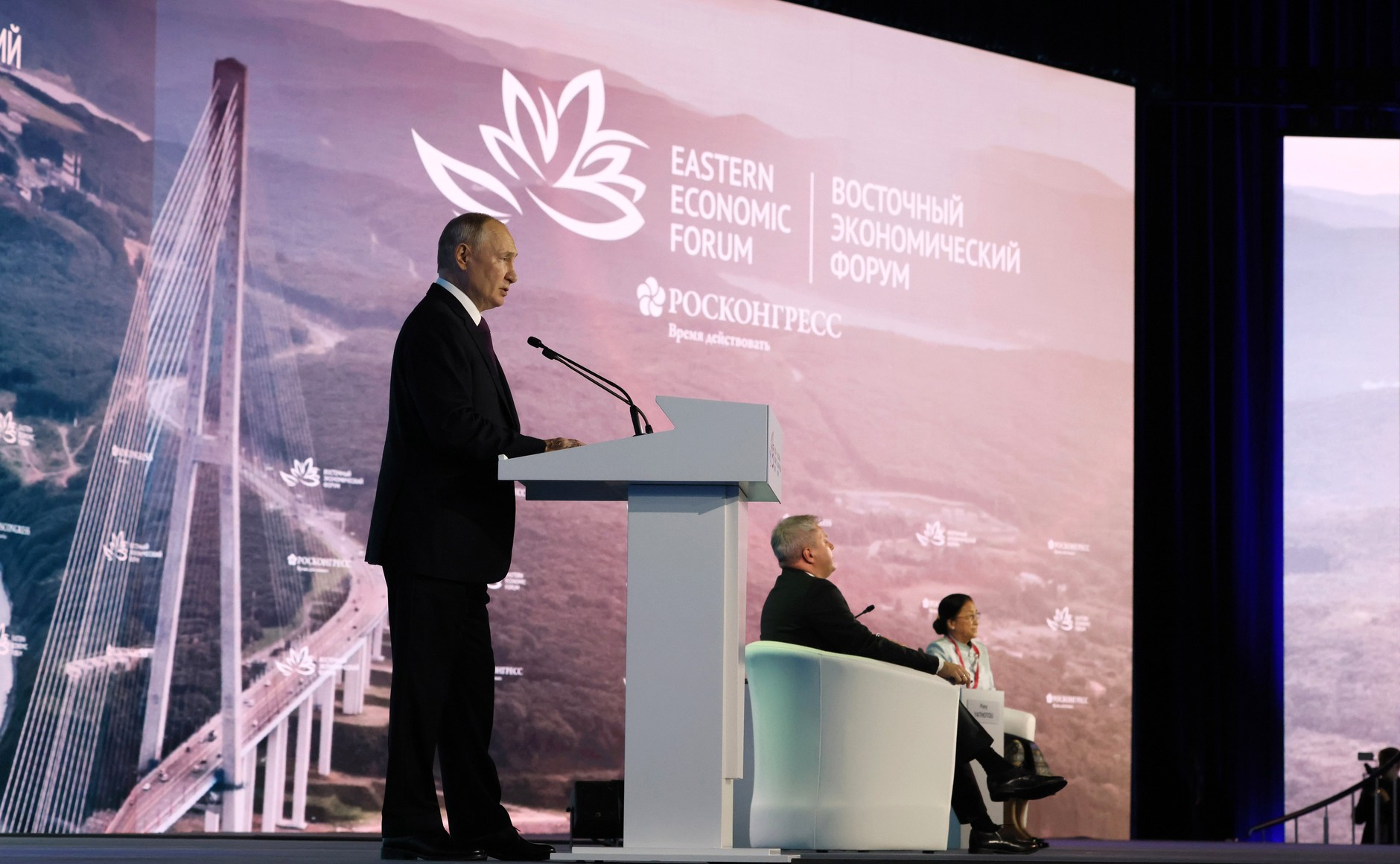
Russian President Vladimir Putin and Yathotou at the Eastern Economic Forum in Vladivostok, 12 September 2023

In December 2010, Laotian Prime Minister Bouasone Bouphavanh resigned and was replaced by the then President of the National Assembly of Laos Thongsing Thammavong, and as a result, Yanthou succeeded Thammavong as the President of the National Assembly of Laos. The Tenth Session of the Sixth National Congress of Laos passed the proposal of the Standing Committee of the National Assembly on 23 December, confirming the appointment. She was also re-elected to the Party Central Committee and the Politburo at the Ninth Congress of the Lao People's Revolutionary Party held in March 2011 and on 17 May 2014, she and other senior government officials did not get on the An-74 of Lao People's Army because they suddenly changed their plans before the departure and took another plane hence avoiding the ill-fated aircraft which crashed while en route to Xiangkhouang Province, killing 16 of 17 occupants onboard. At the Tenth Congress of the Lao People's Revolutionary Party in 2016, she was re-elected as the President of the National Assembly.

Yathotou and Bounthong Chitmany were elected as vice presidents of Laos in March 2021. At the same time, she stepped down as the President of the National Assembly and was replaced by the former central chairman of the Lao Front for National Development Saysomphone Phomvihane.

== Awards and honors ==
- Japan:
  - Grand Cordon of the Order of the Rising Sun (2022)
- Russia:
  - Order of Friendship (2017)

Political offices
| Preceded by Phankham Viphavanh | Vice President of Laos; 2021–present | Incumbent |
