= Politburo of the Lao People's Revolutionary Party =

Party Organ in Laos

The Politburo of the Lao People's Revolutionary Party is the highest decision-making organ of the Lao People's Revolutionary Party when the Central Committee is not convened for a plenary session.

== History ==
The Politburo of the Central Committee was established at the 2nd LPRP National Congress, held on 3–6 February 1972. Seven members were elected to the first Politburo, known as the 2nd Politburo. Of these seven members four concurrently served as members of the 2nd Secretariat.

Pany Yathotou became the first woman and first of Hmong ethnicity to be elected to the Politburo (she was elected in 2006 to the 8th Politburo). Women representation on the Politburo increased during the 11th term of the Central Committee, when both Yathotou and Sisay Leudetmounsone were elected to the 11th Politburo.

=== Terms ===
Term	Members			Period		Duration
Term	Male	Female	Reelected	Start	End	Duration
2nd	7	0	7	6 February 1972	30 April 1982	10 years, 83 days
3rd	7	0	7	30 April 1982	15 November 1986	4 years, 199 days
4th	13	0	8	15 November 1986	29 March 1991	4 years, 134 days
5th	11	0	5	29 March 1991	20 March 1996	4 years, 357 days
6th	9	0	8	20 March 1996	18 March 2001	4 years, 363 days
7th	11	0	9	14 March 2001	21 March 2006	5 years, 7 days
8th	10	1	8	21 March 2006	21 March 2011	5 years, 0 days
9th	10	1	5	21 March 2011	22 January 2016	4 years, 307 days
10th	10	1	9	22 January 2016	15 January 2021	4 years, 359 days
11th	11	2	8	15 January 2021	8 January 2026	4 years, 358 days
12th	12	1	—	8 January 2026	Incumbent	1 day

== See also ==
- Lao People's Revolutionary Party
- Central Committee of the Lao People's Revolutionary Party
- Secretariat of the Lao People's Revolutionary Party

== Bibliography ==
Books:

- Stuart-Fox, Martin (2008). Historical Dictionary of Laos. Scarecrow Press. ISBN 978-0-81086-411-5.
