= Sombat Yialiher =

Laotian politician

Sombat Yialiher (born 16 September 1956) is a Laotian politician and member of the Lao People's Revolutionary Party (LPRP).

He was elected to full membership at the 7th National Congress and retained a seat on the body until the 9th National Congress.
