= 4th Politburo of the Lao People's Revolutionary Party =

1980s Laos ruling party organ

The 4th Politburo of the Lao People's Revolutionary Party (LPRP), officially the Political Bureau of the 4th Central Committee of the Lao People's Revolutionary Party, was elected in 1986 by the 1st Plenary Session of the 4th Central Committee, in the immediate aftermath of the 4th National Congress.

By 1990 the Politburo was in bad shape. Souphanouvong was convalescing from a stroke he suffered in 1986, Nouhak Phoumsavan began failing intermittently and Kaysone Phomvihane was suffering from several bouts of illness.

== Members ==
Rank	Name	Akson Lao	3rd POL	5th POL	Birth	Death	Type	Gender
1	Kaysone Phomvihane	ໄກສອນ ພົມວິຫານ	Old	Reelected	1924	1992	Member	Male
2	Nouhak Phoumsavan	ໜູຮັກ ພູມສະຫວັນ	Old	Reelected	1920	2008	Member	Male
3	Souphanouvong	ສຸພານຸວົງ	Old	Retired	1909	1995	Member	Male
4	Phoumi Vongvichit	ພູມີ ວົງວິຈິດ	Old	Retired	1909	1994	Member	Male
5	Khamtai Siphandone	ຄໍາໄຕ ສີພັນດອນ	Old	Reelected	1924	2025	Member	Male
6	Phoun Sipaseut	ພູນ ສີປະເສີດ	Old	Reelected	1920	1994	Member	Male
7	Sisomphon Lovansay	ສີສົມພອນ ລໍວັນໄຊ	Old	Retired	1916	1993	Member	Male
8	Sisavath Keobounphanh	ສີສະຫວາດ ແກ້ວບຸນພັນ	New	Not	1928	2020	Member	Male
9	Saly Vongkhamsao	ສາລີ ວົງຄໍາຊາວ	New	Died	1925	1991	Member	Male
10	Maichantan Sengmani	ໄມຈັນຕານ ແສງມະນີ	New	Reelected	1922	1999	Member	Male
11	Samane Vignaket	ສະໝານ ວິຍະເກດ	New	Reelected	1927	2016	Member	Male
12	Oudom Khattigna	ອຸດົມ ຂັດຕິຍະ	New	Reelected	1931	1999	Alternate	Male
13	Choummaly Sayasone	ຈູມມາລີ ໄຊຍະສອນ	New	Reelected	1936	—	Alternate	Male
