= 2014 Lao People's Liberation Army Air Force An-74 crash =

Aviation accident in Laos

Coordinates: 19°25′0″N 103°30′0″E

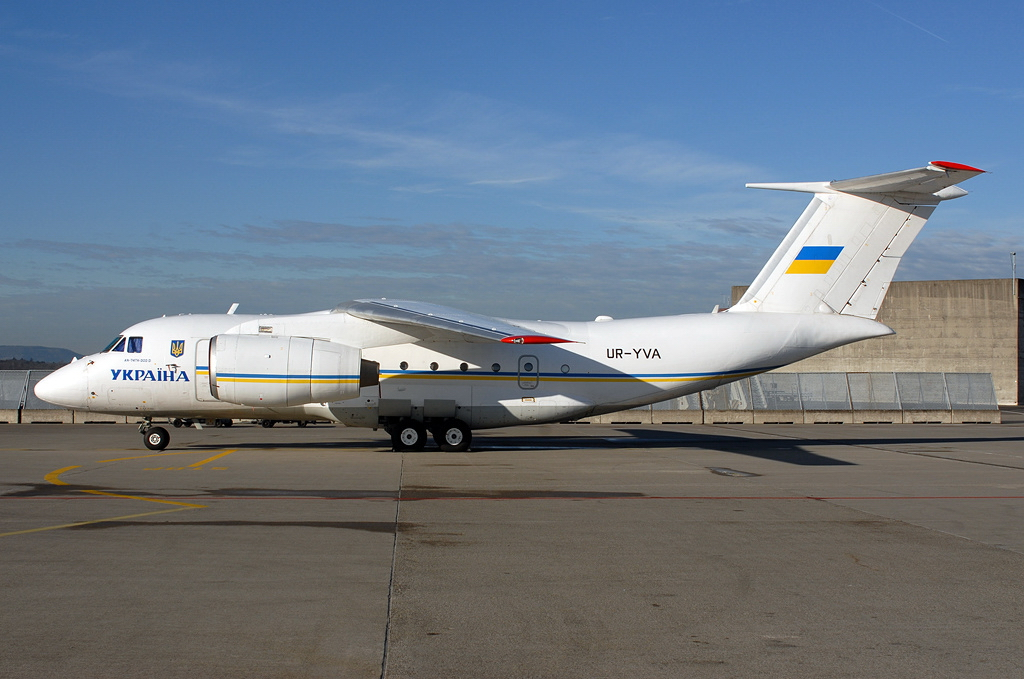
- An Antonov 74TK-300 similar to the aircraft involved

Accident
- Date: 17 May 2014
- Summary: Controlled flight into terrain
- Site: Baan Nadi, Xiangkhouang Province, Laos

Aircraft
- Aircraft type: Antonov An-74TK-300
- Operator: Lao People's Liberation Army Air Force
- Registration: RDPL-34020
- Flight origin: Wattay International Airport, Vientiane, Laos
- Destination: Xieng Khouang Airport, Phonsavan, Laos
- Occupants: 17
- Fatalities: 16
- Survivors: 1

On 17 May 2014, an Antonov An-74 transport aircraft of the Lao People's Liberation Army Air Force crashed while en route to Xiangkhouang Province, northern Laos, killing all but one of the 17 people on board. Among the victims were several Laotian politicians travelling to attend a ceremony celebrating the 55th anniversary of the second division of the Lao People's Army.

== Accident ==
Between 6:15 and 07:00 (IC T), local time on 17 May 2014, 1,500 metres (4,900 ft) or 2,000 metres (6,600 ft) from the destination in Xiang Khouang, the Xieng Khouang Airport, the aircraft crashed in Nadee, Xiang Khouang, 500 kilometres (310 mi) from where it left in Vientiane at the Vientiane-Wattay Airport. The aircraft was too low on final approach, and its landing gear clipped some trees just short of the runway, resulting in the crash, which was attributed to a technical error.

== Aircraft ==
The aircraft involved was a Ukrainian-built Antonov An-74TK-300 twinjet, registered as RDPL-34020. It was ferried to Vientiane-Wattay Airport on 26 October 2009.

== Passengers ==
Initial reports suggested that there were 14 passengers, but later reports gave the figure as 20 on board at the time of the accident, only three were reported to have survived. Once the situation became clearer, the passenger count was given as 17 and the death toll was given as 16, with a sole survivor after the other two original survivors died from their wounds.

Those killed included:

- Douangchay Phichit, Politburo member of Lao People's Revolutionary Party, Deputy Prime Minister and Minister of National Defense
- Thongbanh Sengaphone, Secretary of Lao People's Revolutionary Party and minister of Public Security
- Cheuang Sombounkhanh, Secretary of Lao People's Revolutionary Party and Head of the Propaganda and Training Commission
- Soukanh Mahalath, Secretary of Lao People's Revolutionary Party, Party secretary and Governor of Vientiane

A Thai news source said that the co-pilot, a nurse, and another person had survived. The defence ministry permanent secretary in Thailand said that the Defence Minister of Laos and four others had been killed, and a witness also said that the Defence Minister had died, and gave the figure of 14 deaths.

== Reactions ==
The death of "arguably the two most powerful people in the security apparatus" was reported to be a significant blow to the ruling Lao People's Revolutionary Party. After the crash, a three-day period of national mourning was announced.
