= Somdy Duangdy =

Laotian economist and politician

- Duangdy in 2014

Deputy Prime Minister of Laos
- In office 20 April 2016 – 22 March 2021 Serving with Bounthong Chitmany and Sonexay Siphandone
- Prime Minister: Thongloun Sisoulith

Minister of Finance
- In office 20 April 2016 – 22 March 2021
- Prime Minister: Thongloun Sisoulith
- Preceded by: Lien Thikeo
- Succeeded by: Bounchom Oubonpaseuth
- In office 3 July 2007 – 15 June 2011
- Prime Minister: Thongsing Thammavong; Bouasone Bouphavanh
- Preceded by: Chansy Phosikham
- Succeeded by: Phouphet Khamphounvong

Minister of Planning and Investment
- In office 2012 – 20 April 2016
- Prime Minister: Thongsing Thammavong
- Preceded by: Soulivong Daravong
- Succeeded by: Souphanh Keomisay

Personal details
- Born: 1952 (age 73–74) Savannakhet Province, Laos, French Indochina
- Party: Lao People's Revolutionary Party

Somdy Duangdy (Lao: ສົມດີ ດວງດີ; born 1952) is a Laotian economist and politician. He was Minister of Finance of Laos from 2007 to 2011, and again from 2016. He was born in Savannakhet Province in 1952. He was Minister of Planning and Investment from 2012 to 2016.

== Awards and honors ==
- Japan:
  - Grand Cordon of the Order of the Rising Sun (2019)
