= 5th Politburo of the Lao People's Revolutionary Party =

The 5th Politburo of the Lao People's Revolutionary Party (LPRP), officially the Political Bureau of the 5th Central Committee of the Lao People's Revolutionary Party, was elected in 1991 by the 1st Plenary Session of the 5th Central Committee, in the immediate aftermath of the 5th National Congress.

== Members ==
Rank	Name	Akson Lao	4th POL	6th POL	Birth	Death	Gender
1	Kaysone Phomvihane	ໄກສອນ ພົມວະຫານ	Old	Died	1920	1992	Male
2	Nouhak Phoumsavan	ໜູຮັກ ພູມສະຫວັນ	Old	Retired	1910	2008	Male
3	Khamtai Siphandone	ຄໍາໄຕ ສີພັນດອນ	Old	Reelected	1924	2025	Male
4	Phoun Sipaseut	ພູນ ສີປະເສີດ	Old	Died	1920	1994	Male
5	Maichantan Sengmani	ໄມຈັນຕານ ແສງມະນີ	Old	Died	1922	1991	Male
6	Samane Vignaket	ສະໝານ ວິຍະເກດ	Old	Reelected	1927	2016	Male
7	Oudom Khattigna	ອຸດົມ ຂັດຕິຍະ	Old	Reelected	1931	1999	Male
8	Choummaly Sayasone	ຈູມມາລີ ໄຊຍະສອນ	Old	Reelected	1936	—	Male
9	Somlat Chanthamat	ສົມລັດ ຈັນທະມາດ	New	Died	?	1993	Male
10	Khamphoui Keoboualapha	ຄໍາຜຸຍ ແກ້ວບົວລະພາ	New	Not	1930	—	Male
11	Thongsing Thammavong	ທອງສີງ ທໍາມະວົງ	New	Reelected	1944	—	Male
