= 3rd Politburo of the Lao People's Revolutionary Party =

The 3rd Politburo of the Lao People's Revolutionary Party (LPRP), officially the Political Bureau of the 3rd Central Committee of the Lao People's Revolutionary Party, was elected in 1982 by the 1st Plenary Session of the 3rd Central Committee, in the immediate aftermath of the 3rd National Congress.

== Members ==
Rank	Name	Akson Lao	2nd POL	4th POL	Birth	Death	Gender
1	Kaysone Phomvihane	ໄກສອນ ພົມວິຫານ	Old	Reelected	1924	1992	Male
2	Nouhak Phoumsavan	ໜູຮັກ ພູມສະຫວັນ	Old	Reelected	1920	2008	Male
3	Souphanouvong	ສຸພານຸວົງ	Old	Reelected	1909	1995	Male
4	Phoumi Vongvichit	ພູມີ ວົງວິຈິດ	Old	Reelected	1909	1994	Male
5	Khamtai Siphandone	ຄໍາໄຕ ສີພັນດອນ	Old	Reelected	1924	2025	Male
6	Phoun Sipaseut	ພູນ ສີປະເສີດ	Old	Reelected	1920	1994	Male
7	Sisomphon Lovansay	ສີສົມພອນ ລໍວັນໄຊ	Old	Reelected	1916	1993	Male
