= Lao News Agency =

- Native name: ຂ່າວສານປະເທດລາວ; Agence de presse lao
- Company type: State-owned news agency
- Industry: News media
- Founded: 6 January 1968; 58 years ago
- Headquarters: Vientiane, Laos
- Key people: Sounthone Khanthavong
- Website: kpl.gov.la

Khaosan Pathet Lao (Lao: ຂ່າວສານປະເທດລາວ, romanized: Khaosan Pathet Lao, KPL; French: Agence de presse lao), also known as the Lao News Agency in English, is the official news agency of the Laos Government and the ruling Communist Party. It was started as the news agency of the Lao People's Revolutionary Party on 6 January 1968 in Viengsay and later became the official news agency of Laos after the communists seized power in 1976. Its current General Director is Khampheuy Philapha.
