= Asang Laoly =

- ອາຊາງ ລາວລີ

Deputy Prime Minister of Laos
- In office 30 September 2002 – 20 April 2016 Serving with Somsavat Lengsavad, Thongloun Sisoulith and Douangchay Phichit
- Prime Minister: Thongsing Thammavong; Bouasone Bouphavanh; Boungnang Volachit

Personal details
- Born: 2 February 1941 (age 85) Phongsaly Province, French protectorate of Laos
- Party: Lao People's Revolutionary Party

Asang Laoly (Lao: ອາຊາງ ລາວລີ; born 2 February 1941) is a retired Lao politician, Major General, and member of the Lao People's Revolutionary Party (LPRP). While he was the Deputy Prime Minister of Laos from 2002 to 2016, he also held a number of leadership positions in both the government and in LPRP.

== Early life ==
Asang was born in Phongsaly Province into a Lao Sung and Akha family.

== Career ==
Asang was elected to the LPRP Central Committee at the 3rd National Congress in 1982 and retained a seat on the body until the 9th National Congress in 2011. He was elected to the LPRP Politburo at the 6th National Congress in 1996 and was reelected in 2001 and 2006. When the government changed in 2002, he was named the Deputy Prime Minister of Laos, a position he held until he retired in 2016. He held the role of Minister of the Interior from 1988 until 2006, when he moved into the role of Chair of the State Control Commission (also referred to as the National Regulatory Authority and the Ministry of Public Security. He similarly served as the Director of the LPRP's Commission for Discipline Inspection. He also chaired the National Environmental Committee starting in 2011 and focused on the importance of waterways.

Despite retiring in 2016, Asang is still active within the LPRP and attends events in a representative capacity.

Throughout his career, he was often the sole minority representation.
