= Ministry of Public Security (Laos) =

Government ministry of Laos

- ກະຊວງປ້ອງກັນຄວາມສະຫງົບ

Agency overview
- Formed: 5 April 1961
- Jurisdiction: National
- Headquarters: Vientiane
- Employees: (unknown)
- Annual budget: (unknown)
- Agency executives: Lieutenant General Vilay Lakhamfong, Minister; Lieutenant General Kongthong Phongvichith, Deputy Minister; Lieutenant General Thonglek Mangnormex, Deputy Minister
- Website: http://www.laosecurity.gov.la

The Ministry of Public Security (Lao language: ກະຊວງປ້ອງກັນຄວາມສະຫງົບ) is the ministry of the interior of Laos. The current minister is Lieutenant General Vilay Lakhamfong.

== Structure and organization ==
The Ministry of Public Security comprises several "branches of service", which include the local police, traffic police, immigration police, border police, and other police units.

=== Traffic Police Department ===
The Traffic Police Department is responsible for ensuring road safety for people using vehicles to prevent accidents and ensure safety. The Traffic Police handled almost 6800 road accidents in 2025 alone.

=== Public Security Department ===
The Public Security Department is responsible for maintaining public order via suppressing rioters, robbers, criminals, etc.

=== Central Security Department ===
The Central Security Department is responsible for protecting high-ranking officials and key government facilities in Laos.

== List of Ministers of Public Security ==
- Somseun Khampithoun (1961-1978)
- Maichantan Sengmani (1978-1980)
- Sisavath Keobounphanh (1980-1985)
- Asang Laoli (1985-2002)
- Sutjai Thammasit (2002-2005)
- Thongbanh Sengaphone (2005-2014)
- Somkaew Silawong (2015-2018)
- Vilai Lhakhamfong (2018-present)

== International cooperation ==
In order to increase its capacity to address issues such as the illegal drugs trade and human trafficking, the Ministry of Public Security has established working relations with a number of foreign government agencies and international organisations, including UNODC and UNICEF.

== Human rights issues ==
The security forces subjected to the ministry have occasionally been accused of human rights violations. Their persecution of Christians in Laos is among the heaviest in the world. Particularly, members of the Hmong ethnic group have been subject to violence by security forces.

== Ranks ==
Officers

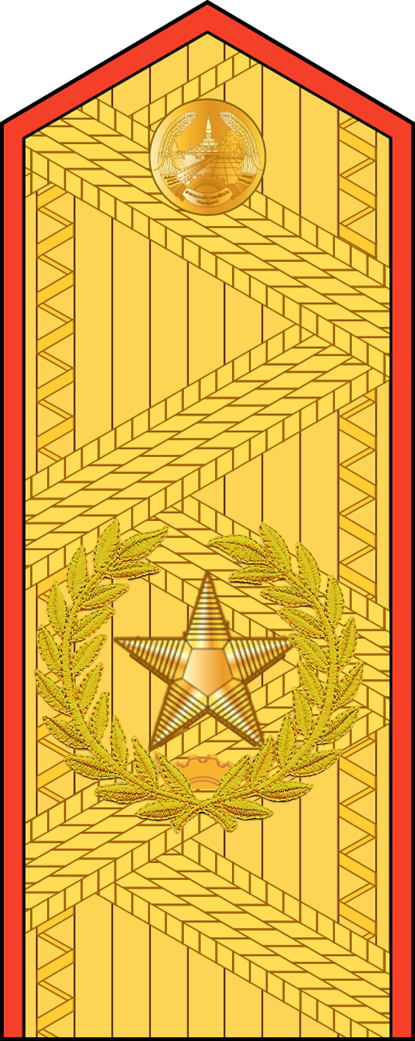
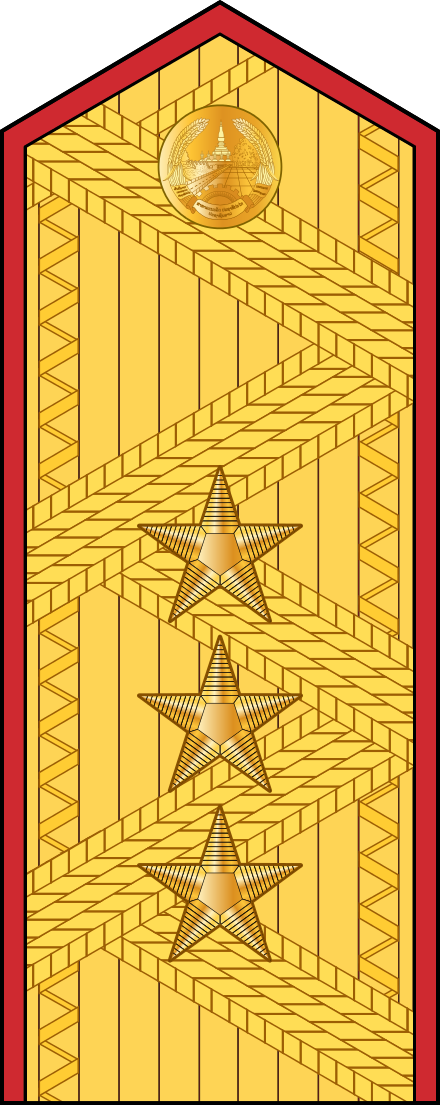
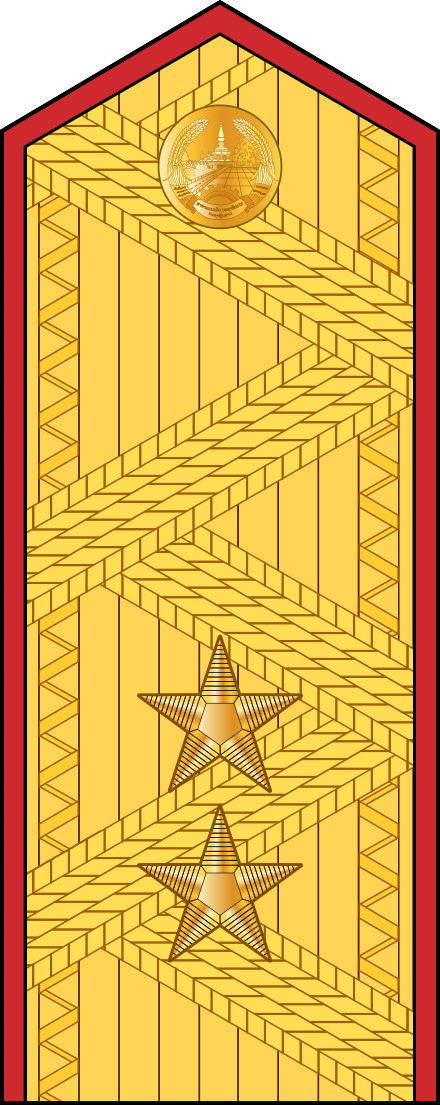
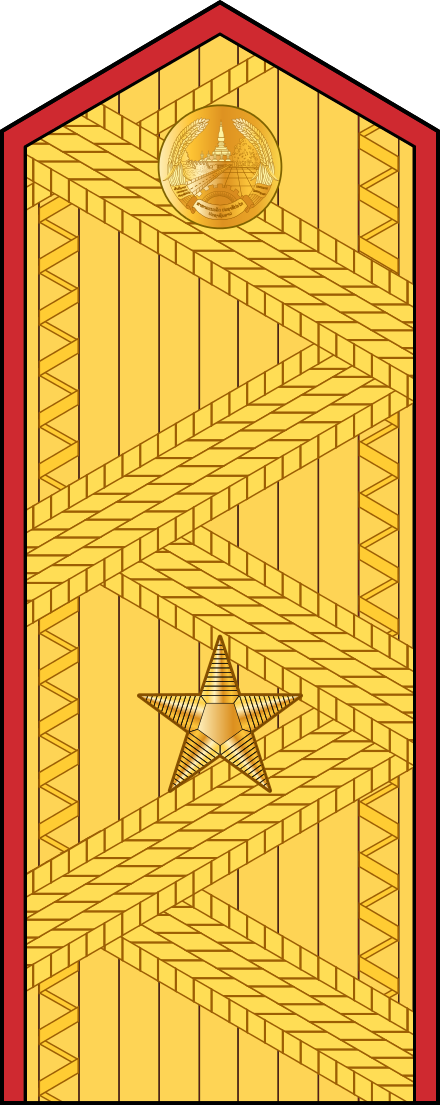
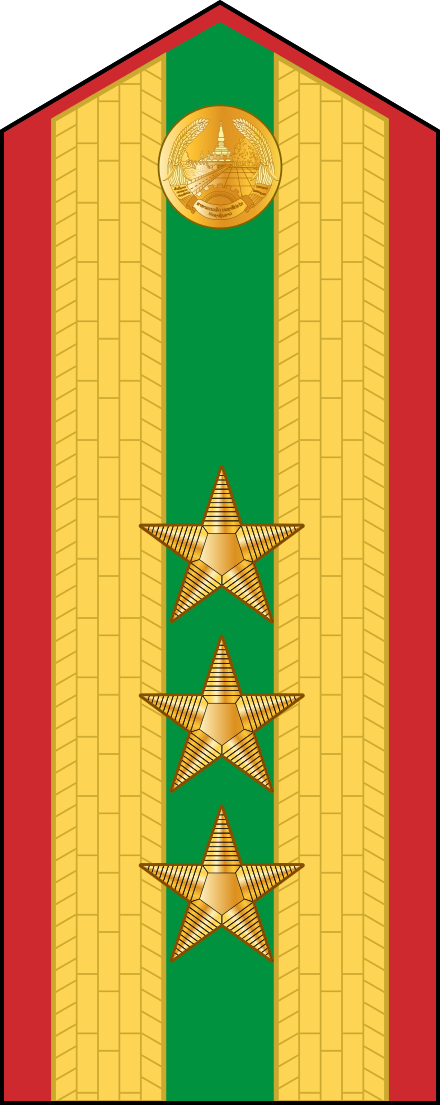
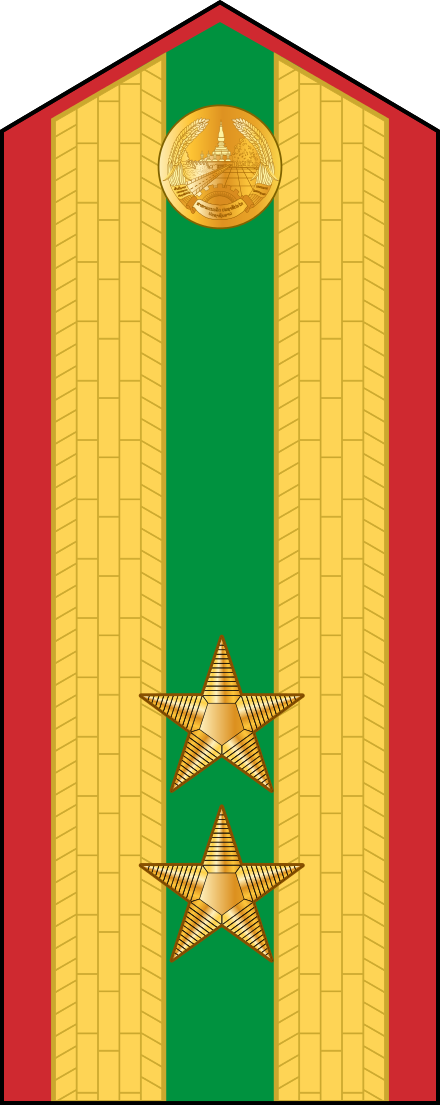
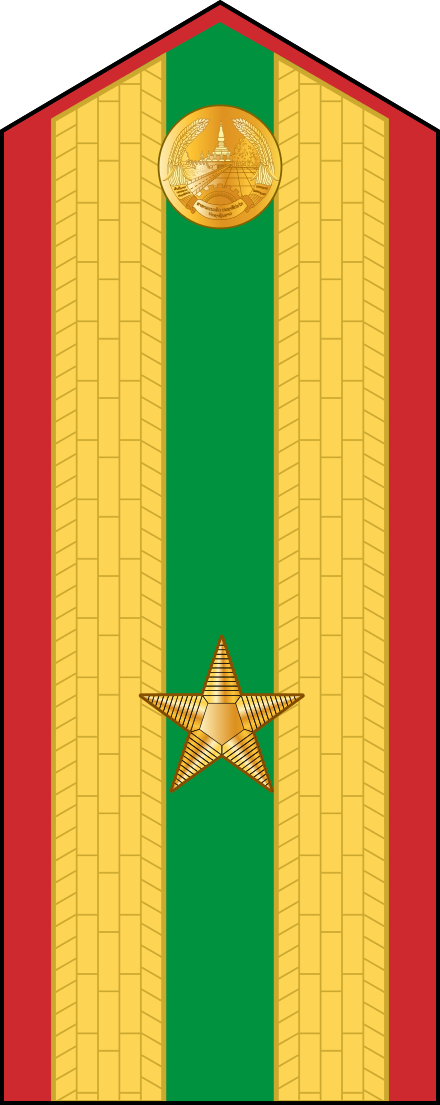
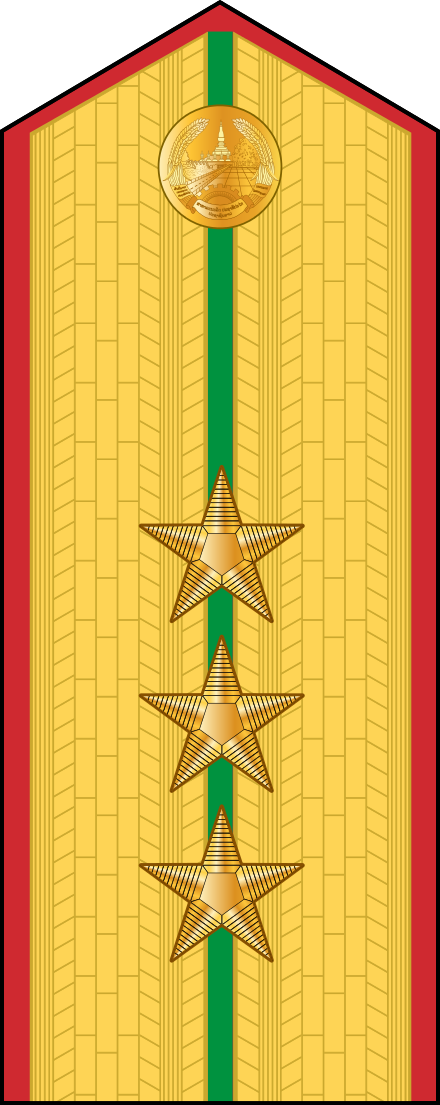
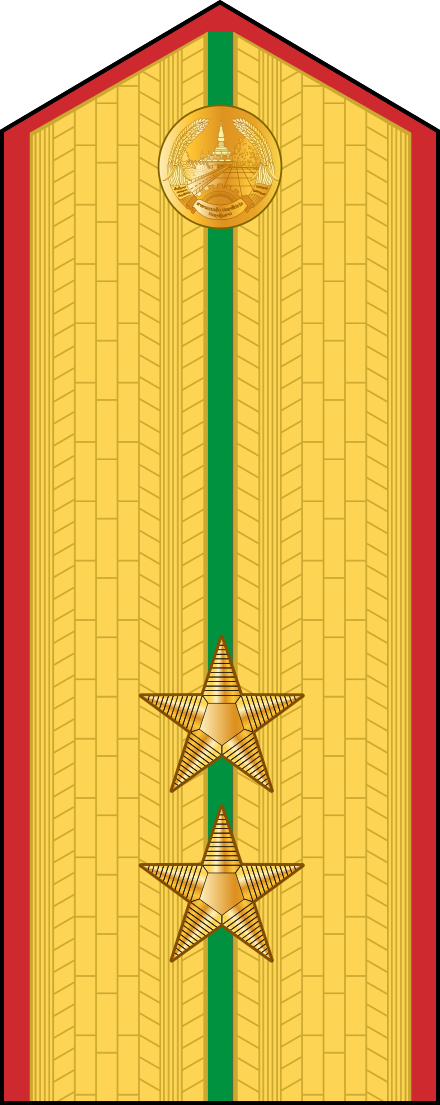
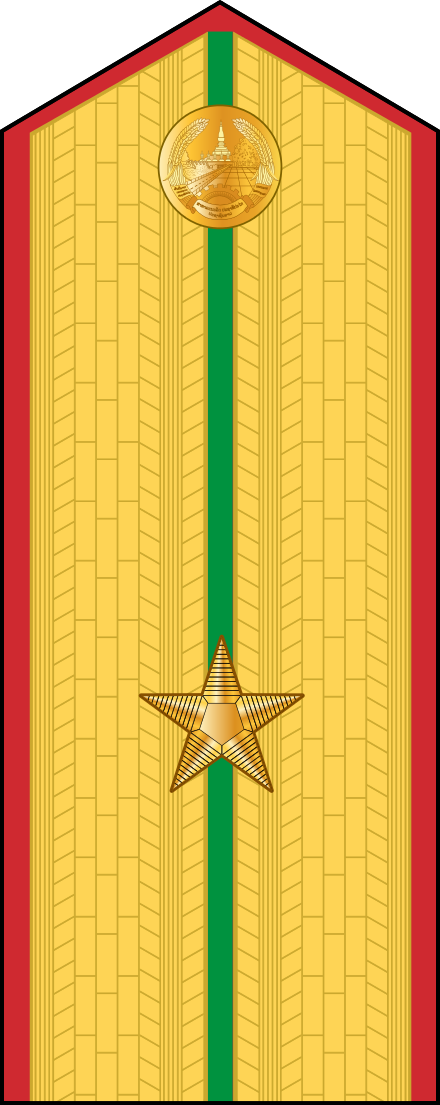
Rank group	General / flag officers				Senior officers			Junior officers
Laos Police
Laos Police	ພົນເອກ; Phonoek	ພົນໂທ; Phonoth	ພົນຕີ Phon ti	ພົນຈັດຕະວາ; Phonchadtauaa	ພັນເອກ; Phanoek	ພັນໂທ; Phanoth	ພັນຕີ Phan ti	ຮ້ອຍເອກ; Honyoek	ຮ້ອຍໂທ; Hony oth	ຮ້ອຍຕີ Hony ti

Enlisted

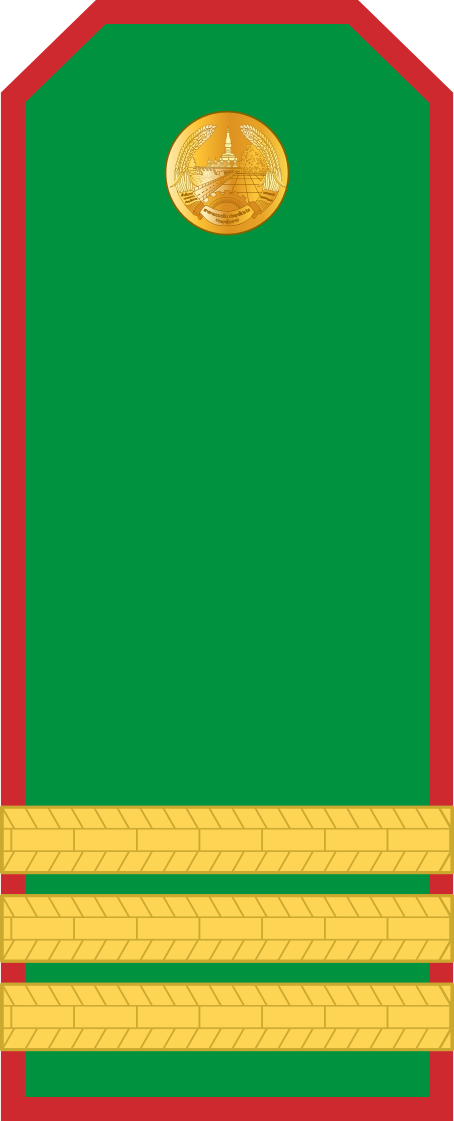
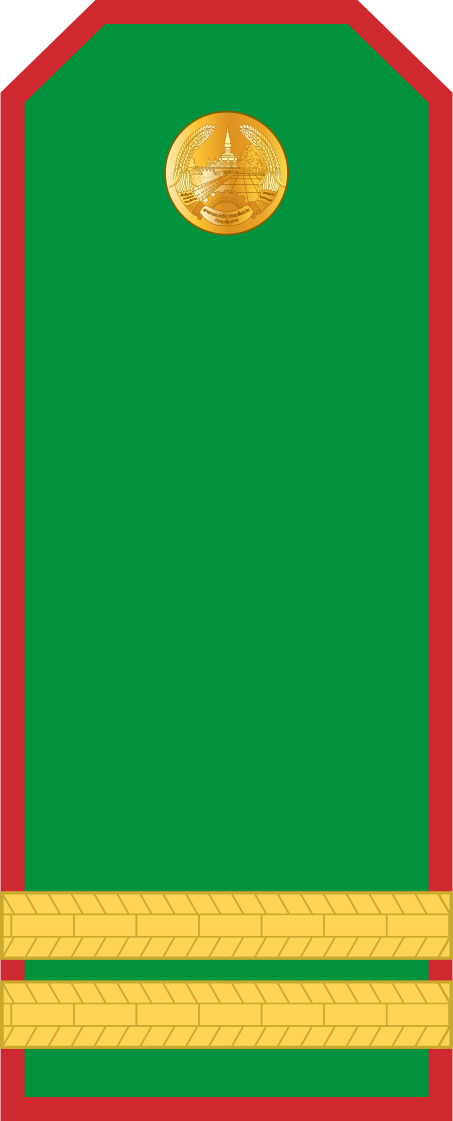
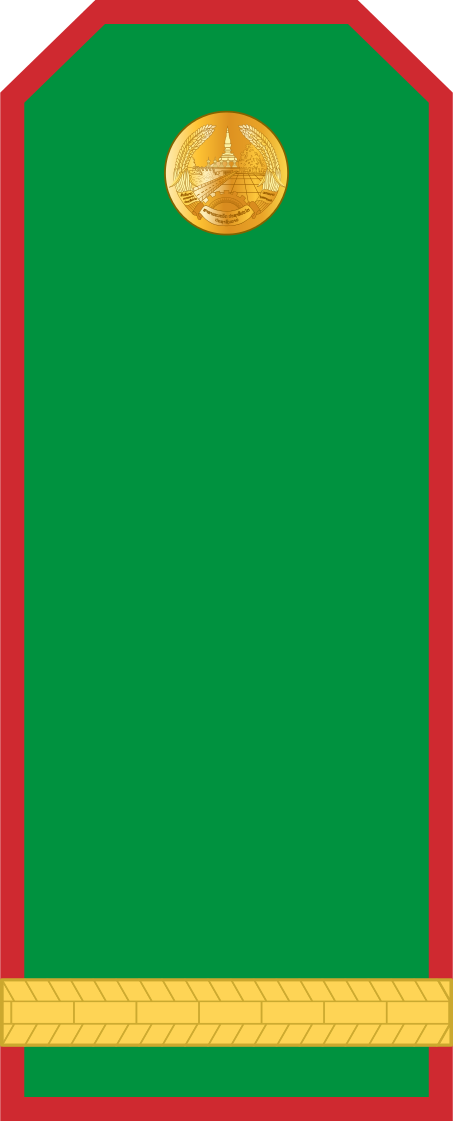
Rank group	Senior NCOs			Junior NCOs	Enlisted
Laos Police
Laos Police	ວາທີ Va thi	ສິບເອກ; Sib ek	ສິບໂທ; Sib oth	ສິບຕີ Sib ti	ຊັ້ນຫນຶ່ງ; Sannung	ຊັ້ນສອງ; Sansong

== See also ==
- Crime in Laos
- Directorate of National Coordination (DNC)
- Laotian Civil War
- Lao People's Armed Forces
- Royal Lao Police
