= Soukanh Mahalath =

Laotian politician

- Mahalath in 2021

Minister of Finance
- In office 27 March 2001 – 2003
- Prime Minister: Bounnhang Vorachith
- Preceded by: Bounnhang Vorachith
- Succeeded by: Chansy Phosikham

Governor of the Central Bank
- In office 6 August 1999 – 27 March 2001
- Prime Minister: Sisavath Keobounphanh
- Preceded by: Cheuang Sombounkhanh
- Succeeded by: Phoupheth Khamphounevong

Personal details
- Born: 7 June 1954 Luang Prabang Province, Laos
- Died: 17 May 2014 (aged 59)
- Party: Lao People's Revolutionary Party
- Occupation: Politician

Soukanh Mahalath (Lao: ສຸກັນ ມະຫາລາດ; 7 June 1954 – 17 May 2014) was a Laotian politician and member of the Lao People's Revolutionary Party. Mahalath was the Mayor of Vientiane, the country's capital city, until his death in May 2014. He had previously held the positions of Minister of Finance from 2001 to 2003 and the governor of the Bank of the Lao P.D.R., the country's central bank, from 1999 until 2001.

Soukanh Mahalath was killed in the Lao People's Liberation Army Air Force An-74 plane crash on 17 May 2014.
