= Lien Thikeo =

Laotian politician

Minister of Agriculture and Forestry
- Incumbent
- Assumed office 20 April 2016
- Prime Minister: Thongloun Sisoulith
- Preceded by: Vilayvanh Phomkhe

Minister of Finance
- In office 13 March 2014 – 20 April 2016
- Prime Minister: Thongsing Thammavong
- Preceded by: Phouphet Khamphounvong
- Succeeded by: Somdy Duangdy

Personal details
- Born: Unknown ?
- Died: Unknown
- Party: Lao People's Revolutionary Party
- Occupation: Politician

Lien Thikeo (Lao: ລຽນ ທິແກ້ວ) is a Laotian politician. He was Minister of Finance from 2014 to 2016.
