= Thongbanh Sengaphone =

Laotian politician

- Thongbanh attending the 9th Association of Southeast Asian Nations ministerial conference on Transnational Crime

Member of the Secretariat of the Central Committee of the Lao People's Revolutionary Party
- In office 22 March 2006 – 17 May 2014
- Leader: Choummaly Sayasone

Minister of Public Security
- In office 9 June 2006 – 17 May 2014
- Preceded by: Soutchay Thammasith
- Succeeded by: Vilay Lakhamfong

Personal details
- Born: 2 May 1953 Thouai Beang, Kingdom of Laos
- Died: 17 May 2014 (aged 61) Baan Nadi, Lao People's Democratic Republic
- Party: Lao People's Revolutionary Party

Thongbanh Sengaphone (Lao: ທອງບັນ ແສງອາພອນ; 2 May 1953 – 17 May 2014) was a Laotian politician and member of the Lao People's Revolutionary Party (LPRP). He served as Minister of Public Security and held seats in the LPRP's Central Committee (appointed at the 7th Congress of the Lao People's Revolutionary Party) and the Secretariat (appointed at the 8th Party Congress).

On 17 May 2014, Sengaphone died when the plane he was traveling on crashed in northern Laos. He was traveling to Xiangkhouang Province to attend a ceremony celebrating the 55th anniversary of the second division of the Lao People's Army.
