= Bouasone Bouphavanh =

Laotian politician

- ບົວສອນ ບຸບຜາວັນ
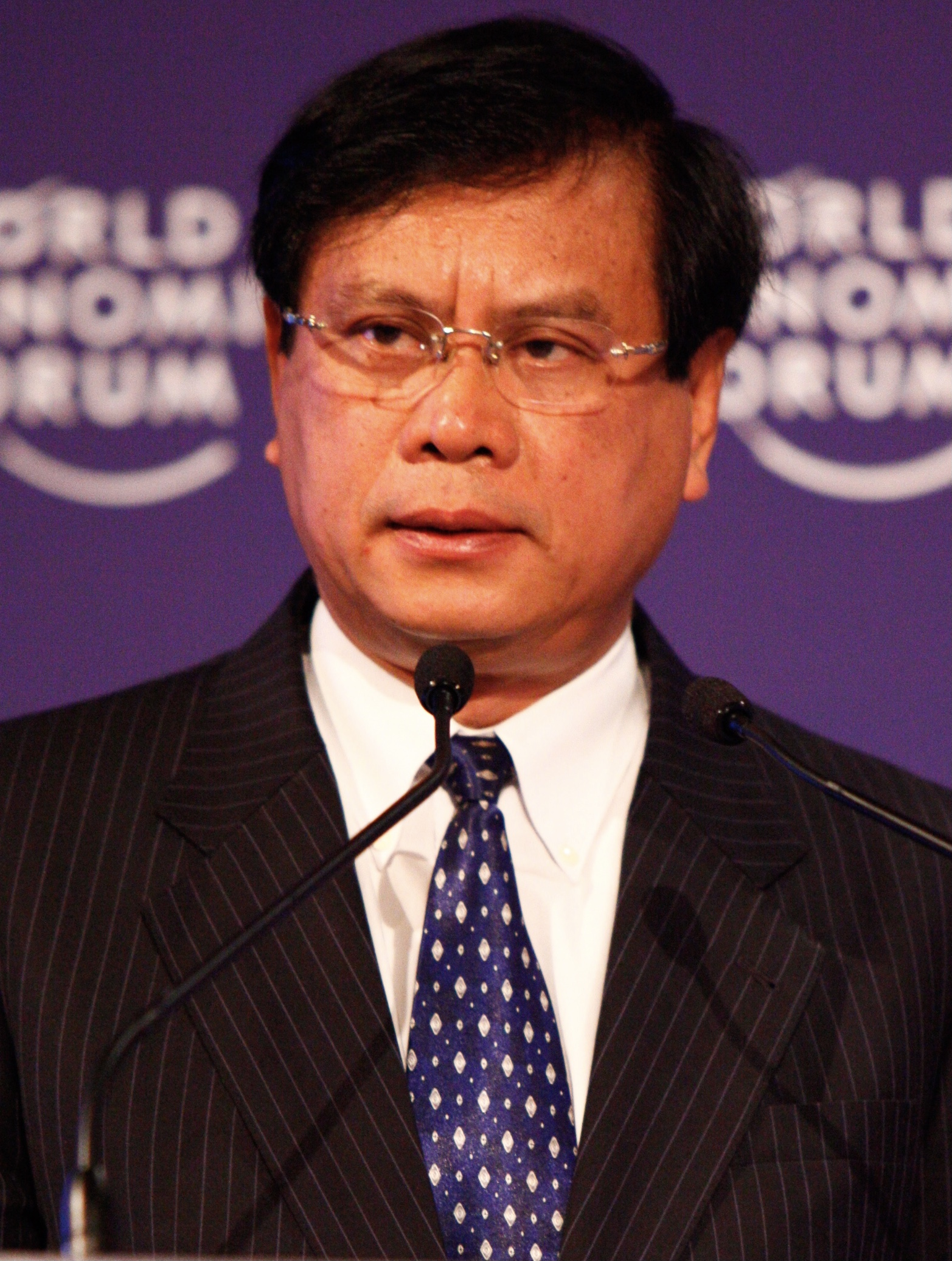
- Bouasone in 2010

15th Prime Minister of Laos
- In office 8 June 2006 – 23 December 2010
- President: Choummaly Sayasone
- Preceded by: Bounnhang Vorachith
- Succeeded by: Thongsing Thammavong

Personal details
- Born: 3 June 1954 (age 72) Ban Tao Poun, Laos
- Party: Lao People's Revolutionary Party
- Spouse: Soumly Bouphavanh

Bouasone Bouphavanh (Lao: ບົວສອນ ບູບຜາວັນ; born 3 June 1954) is a Laotian politician who was Prime Minister of Laos from 2006 to 2010. He was officially appointed to the office by the National Assembly of Laos on 8 June 2006, during a major government reshuffle. He replaced Bounnhang Vorachith who became vice president. Bouasone had previously served as first deputy prime minister since October 3, 2003. Before that, he was third deputy prime minister and was president of the State Planning Committee. He ranks seventh in the Politburo. He was replaced as prime minister on 23 December 2010 by Thongsing Thammavong. Now, Bouasone Bouphavanh currently serves as head of the Lao Party Central Committee's Commission for Economic Development Strategy Research.

== Career ==
He was educated at a primary school and secondary school in Salavan Province and Champasak Province from 1962 to 1974 and later at the Communist Party Institute in Moscow in the Soviet Union from 1985 to 1990.

In 1975, shortly before the fall of Vientiane to the Pathet Lao, he was a student activist who played a key role in protests against the previous regime. He is considered a protégé of former party leader Khamtai Siphandon. He was accepted into the party on 9 April 1980.

He was elected to the LPRP Central Committee at the 6th National Congress and retained a seat on the body until the 9th National Congress. At the 7th National Congress he was elected to the LPRP Politburo, and he was reelected at the 8th National Congress.

Political offices
Preceded by Bounnhang Vorachith	Prime Minister of Laos; 2006–2010	Succeeded by Thongsing Thammavong
