= Bounthong Chitmany =

Laotian politician

- ບຸນທອງ ຈິດມະນີ

Vice President of Laos
- In office 22 March 2021 – 23 March 2026 Serving with Pany Yathotou.
- President: Thongloun Sisoulith
- Preceded by: Phankham Viphavanh
- Succeeded by: Viengthong Siphandone

Standing Member of the LPRP Secretariat

11th term
- In office 15 January 2021 – 8 January 2026
- General Secretary: Thongloun Sisoulith
- Preceded by: Phankham Viphavanh
- Succeeded by: Vansay Phornsavanh

Chairman of the LPRP Central Committee Inspection Commission

10th term
- In office 22 January 2016 – 15 January 2021
- General Secretary: Bounnhang Vorachit
- Succeeded by: Khamphanh Phommathat

9th term
- In office 21 March 2011 – 22 January 2016
- General Secretary: Choummaly Sayasone
- Preceded by: Asang Laoly

Head of the LPRP Central Committee Organisation Commission

8th term
- In office 2006–2010
- General Secretary: Choummaly Sayasone
- Succeeded by: Chansy Phosikham

7th term
- In office 2002–2006
- Chairman: Khamtai Siphandon
- Preceded by: Thongsing Thammavong

Personal details
- Born: 3 July 1948 (age 78) Laos, French Indochina
- Party: Lao People's Revolutionary

Bounthong Chitmany (Lao: ບຸນທອງ ຈິດມະນີ; born 3 July 1948) is a Laotian politician who served as the Vice President of Laos alongside Pany Yathotou from 2021 to 2026. He was Deputy Prime Minister from 2016 to 2021. A veteran of the Laotian Civil War and a member of the Lao People's Revolutionary Party since 1968, he is a member of the party's central committee and was chair of the 10th Inspection Commission of the Lao People's Revolutionary Party.

== Early life ==
Bounthong Chitmany was born in Bokeo province, French Protectorate of Laos, on 3 July 1949. He is a member of the Lamet people.

== Career ==
Chitmany started fighting in the Laotian Civil War on 9 September 1965, and joined the Lao People's Revolutionary Party (LPRP) on 14 May 1968. He was a member of the LPRP's central committee for its 9th and 10th sessions.

The 8th Government of Laos Chitmany was elected Deputy Prime Minister on 20 April 2016. On 22 March 2021, Chitmany was elected Vice President of Laos alongside Pany Yathotou, the first time that two people served as vice president in Laotian history. In 2024, he was a member of a state delegation to Cuba and led discussions with Roberto Morales Ojeda. He led a delegation to the funeral of Nguyễn Phú Trọng, General Secretary of the Communist Party of Vietnam, on 26 July 2024.

An investigation into the collapse of a dam at the Xe-Pian Xe-Namnoy hydropower installation was chaired by Chitmany in 2018. He was chair of the 10th Inspection Commission of the Lao People's Revolutionary Party.

== Works cited ==
=== News ===
- "ກອງປະຊຸມໃຫຍ່ຜູ້ແທນທົ່ວປະເທດຄັ້ງທີ X ຂອງພັກ". Lao News Agency. Archived from the original on 30 June 2025.
- "ກອງປະຊຸມໃຫຍ່ຜູ້ແທນທົ່ວປະເທດຄັ້ງທີ IX ຂອງພັກ". Lao News Agency. Archived from the original on 30 June 2025.
- "ທ່ານ ດຣ ບຸນທອງ ຈິດມະນີ ໄດ້ຮັບການເລືອກຕັ້ງ ເປັນຮອງນາຍົກລັດຖະມົນຕີ". Lao News Agency. 20 April 2016. Archived from the original on 30 June 2025.
- "ທ່ານ ດຣ. ບຸນທອງ ຈິດມະນີ". China Radio International. 20 April 2016. Archived from the original on 30 June 2025.
- "Lao Government to Suspend All New Hydropower Dam Projects". Laotian Times. 8 August 2018. Archived from the original on 30 June 2025.
- "Lao top leader lays wreath at Vietnamese Party Chief's funeral in Hanoi". Vientiane Times. 26 July 2024. Archived from the original on 30 June 2025.
- "Vice President Receives Vietnam's Vice Foreign Minister". Lao News Agency. 2 April 2025. Archived from the original on 30 June 2025.
- "Vice President's visit to Cuba strengthens Party ties". Vientiane Times. 8 May 2024. Archived from the original on 30 June 2025.
- Thong, Champa (16 January 2021). "ຜູ້ນໍາລາວສູງສຸດຄົນໃໝ່ ທ່ານ ທອງລຸນ ສີສຸລິດ". Radio Free Asia. Archived from the original on 30 June 2025.
- Vaenkeo, Souksakhone (29 March 2021). "NA closes with state leaders elected, development targets approved". Vientiane Times. Archived from the original on 30 June 2025.

=== Web ===
- "Princess Sabeeka Bint Ibrahim Al Khalifa". UN Women. Archived from the original on 30 June 2025.

Political offices
Preceded by Phankham Viphavanh	Vice President of Laos; 2021–present	Incumbent
