= Secretariat of the Lao People's Revolutionary Party =

The Secretariat of the Lao People's Revolutionary Party, known as the Executive Committee from 2006 to 2011, is an organ of the Central Committee of the Lao People's Revolutionary Party.

== History ==
The Secretariat of the Central Committee was established at the 2nd LPRP National Congress, held on 3–6 February 1972. It was to be led by the General Secretary of the Central Committee and responsible for handling day-to-day affairs. The four members elected to the 2nd Secretariat concurrently served as members of the 2nd Politburo.

The party leadership structure was reformed at the 5th LPRP National Congress, held on 27–29 March 1991, and the office of General Secretary of the Central Committee was with the post of Chairman of the Central Committee and the Secretariat was abolished.

At the 8th National Congress the Secretariat was reestablished in the form of the Executive Committee.

The 1st plenary session of the 11th Central Committee elected two women to the 11th Secretariat for the first time in that body's history.

=== Terms ===
Term	Members			Period		Duration
Term	Male	Female	Reelected	Start	End	Duration
2nd	6	0	6	6 February 1972	30 April 1982	10 years, 83 days
3rd	9	0	6	30 April 1982	15 November 1986	4 years, 199 days
4th	9	0	—	15 November 1986	29 March 1991	4 years, 134 days
8th	6	0	3	21 March 2006	21 March 2011	5 years, 0 days
9th	9	0	4	21 March 2011	22 January 2016	4 years, 307 days
10th	9	0	2	22 January 2016	15 January 2021	4 years, 359 days
11th	6	3	5	15 January 2021	8 January 2026	4 years, 358 days
12th	7	4	—	8 January 2026	Incumbent	1 day

== See also ==
- Lao People's Revolutionary Party
- Central Committee of the Lao People's Revolutionary Party
- Politburo of the Lao People's Revolutionary Party

== Bibliography ==
Books:

- Stuart-Fox, Martin (2008). Historical Dictionary of Laos. Scarecrow Press. ISBN 978-0-81086-411-5.
