= 7th National Congress of the Lao People's Revolutionary Party =

- Date: 12–14 March 2001 (3 days)
- Participants: 452 delegates
- Outcome: The election of the 7th Central Committee

The 7th National Congress of the Lao People's Revolutionary Party (LPRP) was held in Vientiane from 12 to 14 March 2001. The congress occurs once every five years. A total of 452 delegates represented the party's nearly 100,000 card-carrying members.
