= 8th National Congress of the Lao People's Revolutionary Party =

- Date: 18–21 March 2006 (4 days)
- Participants: 498 delegates (which includes the members of the 7th Central Committee)
- Outcome: The election of the 8th Central Committee

The 8th National Congress of the Lao People's Revolutionary Party was held in Vientiane from 18 to 21 March 2006. The congress occurs once every five years. A total of 498 delegates represented the party's 148,590 card-carrying members.

== Central Committee composition ==
The 8th Congress elected the 8th Central Committee, in which 55 officials were elected to a seat. An estimated 40 percent of the members of the 7th Central Committee retired from active politics, and were succeeded by 19 officials from wide ethnic backgrounds. The average age of the new members was 51, versus 60 for the older members. Of the 19, six of them had doctorates, with the majority having doctorates in Marxist–Leninist studies. The majority of them had either a background from the Political Department of the Lao People's Army or from the party's Central School. According to a dispatch by the American Embassy in Laos "The new CC [Central Committee] may be younger, but it is no less Communist." Members of the 7th Central Committee who were not reelected were Sileua Bounkham, Thongvang Sihachak, Oneneua Phommachanh‚ Bouathong Vonglokham, Khamkeut Veunkham, Sengnyong Vongchanhkham, Cheuying Vang, Le Kakanya, Boualane Silipanya, Kenekham Senglathone, Siane Saphangthong, Siho Bannavong and Phoumi Thipphavone.

The majority of them have work experience from local administration or as province governors. In the Central Committee rankings, Bounthong Chitmany rose from 34 to 12, Sombath Yialyheu rose from 42 to 13 and Thongbane Sengaphone rose from 43 to 14. According to Martin Stuart-Fox these three were "poised to enter the Politburo at the next party congress." The two sons of Kaysone Phomvihane, party leader from 1955 to 1992, the son of Khamtai Siphandon, and the son of Samane Vignaket were elected to the Central Committee. It has been rumored that sons of leading officials have been appointed to high office because certain segments of the leadership have struck deals to promote each other's children to the Central Committee so as to secure their political and economic futures.

== Immediate aftermath ==
The 1st plenum of the 8th Central Committee reestablished the Secretariat and elected the 8th Politburo of the Lao People's Revolutionary Party, in which Khamtai, the outgoing party General Secretary, was the only member of the 7th Politburo who resigned. Choummaly Sayasone, the Vice President of Laos, succeeded Khamtai as party general secretary. While no one left their posts, two new members were elected to the politburo; Somsavat Lengsavat and Pany Yathothu, who was the first ethnic Hmong and first woman to be appointed to that body.

== Bibliography ==
- Gunn, Geoffrey (January 2007). "Laos in 2006: Changing of the Guard". Asian Survey. 47 (1). University of California Press: 183–188. doi:10.1525/as.2007.47.1.183. JSTOR 10.1525/as.2007.47.1.183.
- Stuart-Fox, Martin (2007). "Laos: Politics in a Single-party State". Southeast Asian Affairs. 26 (1). University of California Press, Institute of Southeast Asian Studies: 161–180. JSTOR 27913331. S2CID 154538190.
