= Phankham Viphavanh =

Prime Minister of Laos from 2021–2022

- ພັນຄຳ ວິພາວັນ
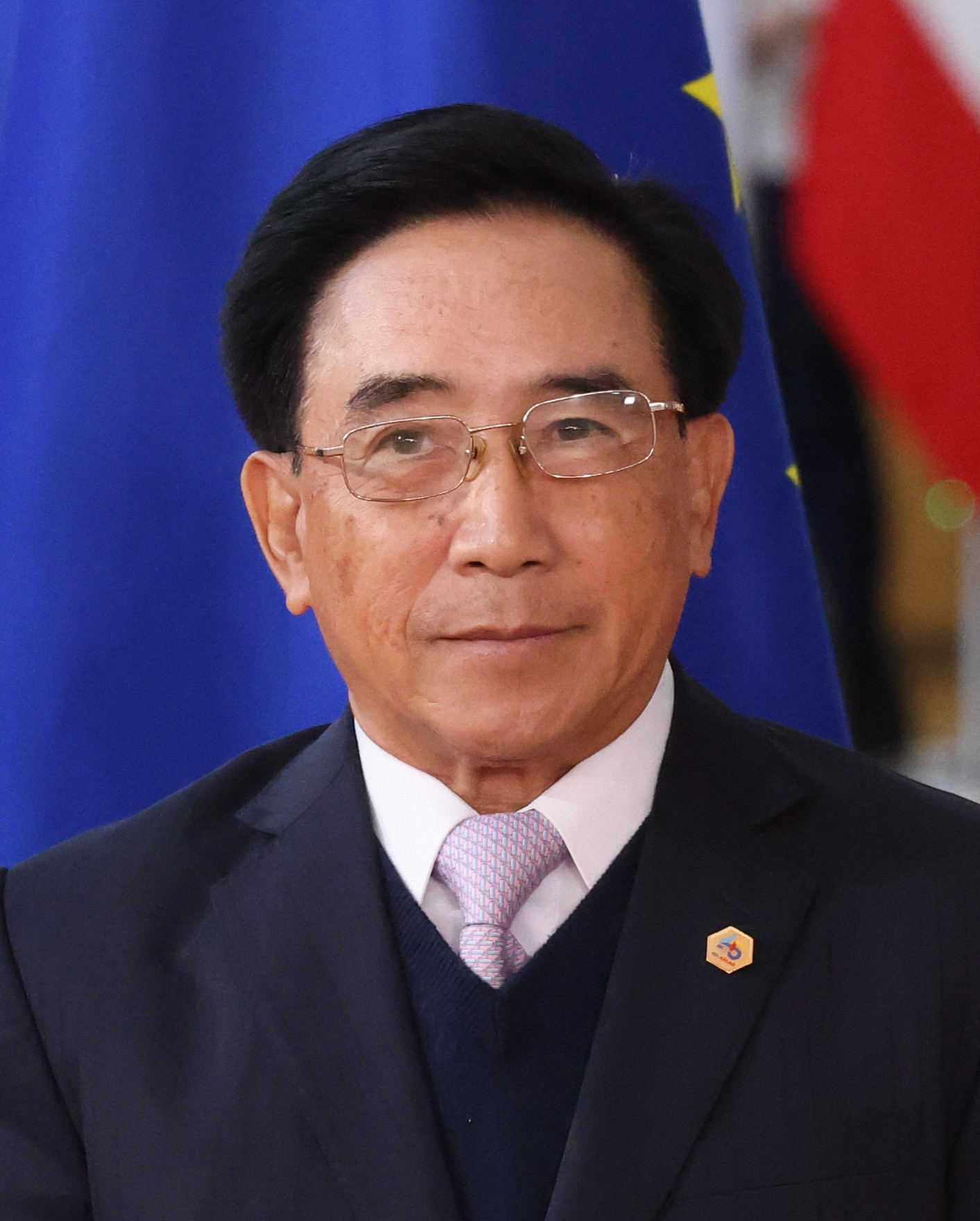
- Phankham in 2022

18th Prime Minister of Laos
- In office 22 March 2021 – 30 December 2022
- President: Thongloun Sisoulith
- Preceded by: Thongloun Sisoulith
- Succeeded by: Sonexay Siphandone

5th Vice President of Laos
- In office 20 April 2016 – 22 March 2021
- President: Bounnhang Vorachit
- Preceded by: Bounnhang Vorachit
- Succeeded by: Pany Yathotou & Bounthong Chitmany

Standing Member of the LPRP Secretariat
- In office 21 January 2016 – 15 January 2021
- General Secretary: Bounnhang Vorachit
- Preceded by: Bounnhang Vorachit
- Succeeded by: Bounthong Chitmany

Personal details
- Born: 14 April 1951 (age 75) French Protectorate of Laos
- Party: People's Revolutionary Party
- Occupation: politician

Phankham Viphavanh (Lao: ພັນຄຳ ວິພາວັນ; born 14 April 1951) is a Laotian politician, a member of the Politburo and the Executive Committee of the Lao People's Revolutionary Party. He became the Prime Minister of Laos, who was elected by the National Assembly of Laos in March 2021.

He was deputy minister in the prime minister's office from 2003 to 2005, then was elected to the eighth Party Central Committee in 2006, and became governor of Houaphanh province. He was elected to politburo in 2011, and then held the position of Minister of Education and Sports. He was also the president of the Lao–Vietnam Friendship Association.

In 2014, he became the Deputy Prime Minister and in April 2016, he was elected as Vice President of Laos.

Party political offices
Preceded by Bounnhang Vorachith	Executive Secretary of the Executive Committee; 2011–present	Incumbent
Political offices
Preceded by Bounnhang Vorachith	Vice President of Laos; 2016–2021	Next: Pany Yathotou; Bounthong Chitmany
Preceded by Thongloun Sisoulith	Prime Minister of Laos; 2021–2022	Succeeded by Sonexay Siphandone
