= Douangchay Phichit =

Laotian politician

Lieutenant general Douangchay Phichit
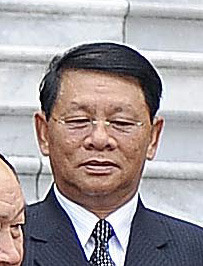

Deputy Prime Minister of Laos
- In office 8 July 2006 – 17 May 2014 (his death)
- Prime Minister: Bouasone Bouphavanh; Thongsing Thammavong

Minister of National Defense
- In office 27 March 2001 – 17 May 2014
- Preceded by: Choummaly Sayasone
- Succeeded by: Sengnuan Xayalath

Personal details
- Born: 5 April 1944 Attapeu, Kingdom of Laos
- Died: 17 May 2014 (aged 70) Baan Nadi, Lao People's Democratic Republic
- Party: Lao People's Revolutionary Party
- Spouse: Lieutenant Colonel Mrs Thanda Phichit (died 17 May 2014)

Lieutenant general Douangchay Phichit (Lao: ດວງໃຈ ພິຈິດ; 5 April 1944 – 17 May 2014) was a Laotian politician from Attapeu and a Politburo member of the Lao People's Revolutionary Party (from the 7th Congress of the Lao People's Revolutionary Party until his death). He served as the Deputy Prime Minister and Minister of National Defense.

On 17 May 2014, Phichit and his wife, Lieutenant Colonel Mrs Thanda Phichit, died when the plane he was traveling on crashed in northern Laos.
