= Bounnhang Vorachit =

Former general secretary of the Lao People's Revolutionary Party (2016-2021)

- ບຸນຍັງ ວໍລະຈິດ
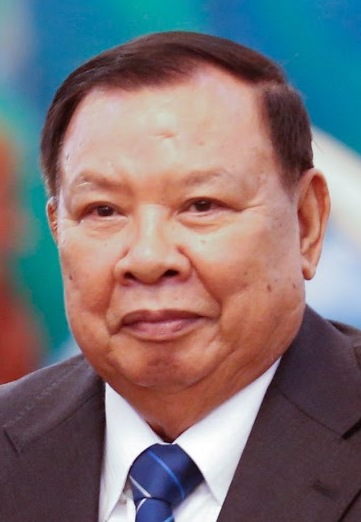
- Vorachit in 2016

General Secretary of the Lao People's Revolutionary Party
- In office 22 January 2016 – 15 January 2021
- Deputy: Phankham Viphavan (Standing Member)
- Preceded by: Choummaly Sayasone
- Succeeded by: Thongloun Sisoulith

6th President of Laos
- In office 20 April 2016 – 22 March 2021
- Prime Minister: Thongloun Sisoulith
- Vice President: Phankham Viphavanh
- Preceded by: Choummaly Sayasone
- Succeeded by: Thongloun Sisoulith

4th Vice President of Laos
- In office 8 June 2006 – 20 April 2016
- President: Choummaly Sayasone
- Preceded by: Choummaly Sayasone
- Succeeded by: Phankham Viphavanh

1st Standing Member of the LPRP Secretariat
- In office 8 June 2006 – 21 January 2016
- General Secretary: Choummaly Sayasone
- Preceded by: Post established
- Succeeded by: Phankham Viphavanh

14th Prime Minister of Laos
- In office 27 March 2001 – 8 June 2006
- President: Khamtai Siphandon
- Preceded by: Sisavath Keobounphanh
- Succeeded by: Bouasone Bouphavanh

Minister of Finance
- In office 6 August 1999 – 27 March 2001
- Prime Minister: Sisavath Keobounphanh
- Preceded by: Khamphoui Keoboualapha
- Succeeded by: Soukanh Mahalath

Personal details
- Born: 15 August 1937 (age 89) Savannakhet, French Protectorate of Laos
- Party: Lao People's Revolutionary Party (1955–present)
- Spouse: Khammeung Vorachit

Military service
- Allegiance: Laos
- Branch/service: LPAF
- Rank: Colonel

Bounnhang Vorachit (Lao: ບຸນຍັງ ວໍລະຈິດ; born 15 August 1937) is a retired Laotian politician who was General Secretary of the Lao People's Revolutionary Party (LPRP), the country's top leader, and President of Laos from 2016 to 2021. He was previously prime minister from 2001 to 2006 and vice president from 2006 to 2016. During his tenure, Barack Obama made the first visit to Laos by a sitting U.S. president, and Laos deepened its ties with China through the Belt and Road Initiative and the railway between the two countries. He retired at the party's Eleventh Congress in January 2021, and he was succeeded as party leader and president by Thongloun Sisoulith.

== Early life and military career ==
Vorachit was born on 15 August 1937 in Na village, Thapangthong District, Savannakhet Province. According to the Nikkei Asian Review, he joined the Pathet Lao resistance movement in 1951 and worked in the propaganda department of its armed forces in Savannakhet. His official biography states that he began work in March 1954 and was a squad leader in Battalion 605 from 1954 to 1957. He joined the Lao People's Party, the forerunner of the Lao People's Revolutionary Party (LPRP), in September 1957. From 1957 to 1961, he studied in Vietnam.

During the Laotian Civil War, Vorachit returned to Laos to help prepare for the capture of Luang Namtha Province. After the victory there in 1962, he went back to Vietnam to study at a military college. His official biography lists him as a platoon leader in Division 1 from 1961 to 1962 and as deputy political officer of Battalion 613 from 1962 to 1968. From 1969 to 1972, he headed the organizing committee of the Xiengkhouang zone, and from 1972 to 1973, he was deputy commander of the Northern Front. From 1973 to 1978, he was party secretary of the combined forces in Luang Prabang Province.

After the founding of the Lao People's Democratic Republic in 1975, Vorachit studied socialist theory in Vietnam from 1978 to 1980. From 1980 to 1982, he was head of military political affairs for the central region.

== Provincial and government posts ==
From 1982 to 1993, Vorachit was party secretary of Savannakhet Province, and he also served as the province's governor. He was elected to the party's Central Committee in 1982. From 1993 to 1999, he was party secretary and mayor of Vientiane. He was elected to the Politburo at the party's Sixth Congress in 1996. He also chaired government committees on investment and international cooperation, forest land planning and rural development.

Sayalath and Creak wrote that Vorachit had profited from the rapid expansion of the timber industry in the 1980s and 1990s and had close links with business groups. The historian Martin Stuart-Fox described him as representing the central Laos patronage network of the former Politburo member Nouhak Phoumsavanh.

=== Deputy Prime Minister and Prime Minister ===
From 1999 to 2001, Vorachit was a deputy prime minister and minister of finance. He became prime minister in 2001. In August 2001, he made a three-day visit to Cambodia.

In November 2004, Vientiane hosted the tenth ASEAN Summit, which decided to convene the first East Asia Summit in 2005 and to begin drafting an ASEAN Charter. The Lao authorities regarded the summit as a great success. In July 2005, Vorachit opened the 38th ASEAN Ministerial Meeting in Vientiane, where he proposed joint regional investment in hydropower and called for ASEAN to keep its principles of non-interference and decision by consensus.

=== Vice President ===
At the party's Eighth Congress in March 2006, Vorachit became one of the seven members of the Central Committee's executive board, which Stuart-Fox described as a revival of the former party Secretariat in all but name. He was its standing member from 2006 to 2016. In June 2006, the National Assembly elected Choummaly Sayasone as president and Vorachit as vice president, and Bouasone Bouphavanh succeeded him as prime minister.

In December 2013, Vorachit told the government's annual inspection meeting that many officials were abusing their authority to embezzle state property and that illegal logging and mining took place with the involvement of state officials. He warned that if these problems continued, they could affect the party's leadership.

== General Secretary and President ==
=== Election ===
At the party's Tenth Congress, Vorachit, then 78, was elected general secretary on 22 January 2016, succeeding Sayasone, who had led the party for ten years. He was the highest-ranked member of the Politburo who was not retiring, and like all previous general secretaries, he came from southern Laos and had a military career. Sayalath and Creak described him as well integrated into the patronage networks of Sayasone and the party elder Khamtai Siphandone, and they suggested that his age made him a stopgap leader. Stuart-Fox said that Vorachit was unlikely to move towards greater democracy or better human rights and that there would be no new diplomatic alignments.

On 20 April 2016, the first session of the 8th National Assembly unanimously elected Vorachit president, with Phankham Viphavanh as vice president. The new leadership, with Thongloun Sisoulith as prime minister, set the goals of leaving the least developed country category by 2020 and reaching upper-middle-income status by 2030.

=== Foreign relations ===
Vorachit's first trip abroad as party leader and president was an official visit to Vietnam from 25 to 27 April 2016. He made separate visits to Vietnam and China after his election. He made an official visit to China in May 2016, attended the G20 summit in Hangzhou in September 2016, and attended the first Belt and Road Forum in May 2017. During a state visit by the Chinese leader Xi Jinping to Laos on 13 and 14 November 2017, the two countries agreed to build a "community of shared future" and an economic corridor along the railway linking Yunnan with Laos. On 30 April 2019, during a state visit to China, Vorachit and Xi signed an action plan between their two parties on building this community, and they witnessed the signing of agreements on the economic corridor and the railway.

Laos chaired ASEAN in 2016. In September 2016, the U.S. president Barack Obama visited Vientiane, the first visit to Laos by a sitting U.S. president, and he met Vorachit. The two leaders launched a comprehensive partnership between their countries, and the United States pledged $90 million over three years for the survey and clearance of unexploded ordnance.

Vorachit made state visits to Cambodia in February 2017 and February 2020, where King Norodom Sihamoni received him at the Royal Palace. In May 2018, he made a state visit to Singapore, where he met President Halimah Yacob and Prime Minister Lee Hsien Loong.

=== Domestic affairs ===
During Vorachit's presidency, Sisoulith's government launched an anti-corruption campaign, which Freedom House said had had some positive impact. After the collapse of the Xe-Pian Xe-Namnoy dam in July 2018, the authorities released little information about the disaster, and according to Freedom House, observers suggested that the official death toll of 43 was far too low.

In his political report to the Eleventh Congress in January 2021, Vorachit criticized officials for lacking the courage and creativity to deal with new problems, stressed the rule of law, especially in economic matters, and called for better "management of social media". Creak interpreted the last point as a reference to suppressing online criticism of the government. The report also celebrated the "partnership of common destiny" with China.

=== Retirement ===
Vorachit did not stand for re-election to the Central Committee at the Eleventh Congress, held in Vientiane from 13 to 15 January 2021. On 15 January, the congress elected Sisoulith to succeed him as general secretary. Sisoulith praised Vorachit as an exemplary and flexible leader who had led a clean life. On 22 March 2021, the National Assembly elected Sisoulith to succeed him as president.

Party political offices
| Preceded by Choummaly Sayasone | General Secretary of the People's Revolutionary Party; 2016–2021 | Succeeded by Thongloun Sisoulith |
Political offices
| Preceded by Sisavath Keobounphanh | Prime Minister of Laos; 2001–2006 | Succeeded by Bouasone Bouphavanh |
| Preceded by Choummaly Sayasone | Vice President of Laos; 2006–2016 | Succeeded by Phankham Viphavan |
| Preceded by Choummaly Sayasone | President of Laos; 2016–2021 | Succeeded by Thongloun Sisoulith |
Diplomatic posts
| Preceded by Najib Razak | Chairperson of ASEAN; 2016 | Succeeded by Rodrigo Duterte |
