= Choummaly Sayasone =

Laotian politician (born 1936)

- ຈູມມະລີ ໄຊຍະສອນ
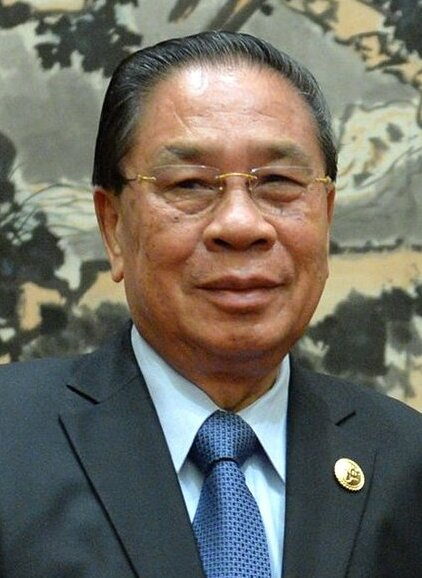
- Sayasone in 2015

General Secretary of the Lao People's Revolutionary Party
- In office 21 March 2006 – 22 January 2016
- Preceded by: Khamtai Siphandone (as Chairman)
- Succeeded by: Bounnhang Vorachith

5th President of Laos
- In office 8 June 2006 – 20 April 2016
- Prime Minister: Bouasone Bouphavanh; Thongsing Thammavong
- Vice President: Bounnhang Vorachith
- Preceded by: Khamtai Siphandon
- Succeeded by: Bounnhang Vorachith

3rd Vice President of Laos
- In office 27 March 2001 – 8 June 2006
- President: Khamtai Siphandon
- Preceded by: Oudom Khattigna
- Succeeded by: Bounnhang Vorachith

Minister of National Defence
- In office 15 August 1991 – 27 March 2001
- Prime Minister: Bounnhang Vorachith; Sisavath Keobounphanh; Khamtai Siphandon
- Preceded by: Khamtai Siphandon
- Succeeded by: Douangchay Phichit

Personal details
- Born: 6 March 1936 (age 90) Attapeu, French Protectorate of Laos, French Indochina
- Party: Lao People's Revolutionary Party
- Spouse: Keosaychay Sayasone (m. 1993; died 2021)

Military service
- Allegiance: Laos
- Branch/service: Lao People's Army
- Rank: Lieutenant General

Lieutenant General Choummaly Sayasone (Lao: ຈູມມະລີ ໄຊຍະສອນ; born 6 March 1936) is a retired Laotian politician and army officer who was General Secretary of the Lao People's Revolutionary Party (LPRP), the country's supreme leader, and President of Laos from 2006 to 2016. Born into a farming family in Attapeu Province, Sayasone joined the communist Pathet Lao forces in 1954 and the party in 1955, and he rose through the army during the Laotian Civil War to command the armed forces of Xieng Khouang Province in 1975. A protégé and close confidant of Khamtai Siphandone, he was minister of national defence from 1991 to 2001 and vice president from 2001 to 2006, before succeeding Khamtai as party leader and head of state in 2006.

As leader, Sayasone made Vietnam the destination of his first foreign visit while expanding ties with China, and in 2013, he became the first Lao head of state to visit France.His government pursued rapid economic growth, and Laos joined the World Trade Organization in 2013. He stepped down as party leader at the party's Tenth Congress in January 2016 and as president in April 2016, and he was succeeded in both posts by Bounnhang Vorachith.

== Early life and military career ==
Sayasone was born on 6 March 1936 into a farming family in Vat Neua village, Attapeu Province, in southern Laos. He is an ethnic Lao. In 1954, after Laos had gained independence from France, he joined the Pathet Lao, the armed communist opposition, in Houaphanh Province, and he took part in several battles as the movement expanded its control. In 1955, he joined the Lao People's Party, the forerunner of the Lao People's Revolutionary Party (LPRP).

Sayasone rose through the ranks of the Pathet Lao army, becoming a deputy platoon leader in 1959, a platoon leader in 1961, political commissar of the 5th Battalion in 1962 and commander of the 2nd Battalion in 1964. In 1964, he studied at a higher political school in Vietnam. During the Laotian Civil War, he was chief of staff of the Xieng Khouang zone from 1968 to 1975, and in 1975, he became commander of the armed forces of Xiangkhouang Province. In 1978, he attended a military academy in the Soviet Union, and in 1983, he studied at Vietnam's academy of politics and public administration. From 1980 to 1982, he was deputy chief of the General Staff of the Ministry of National Defence.

== Party and government posts ==
=== Central Committee and Politburo ===
At the LPRP's Third Congress in 1982, Sayasone was elected to the party's Central Committee. At the Fourth Congress in 1986, he became an alternate member of the Politburo, and he was appointed first deputy minister of national defence. He was promoted within the army and the party by Khamtai Siphandone, who later became party leader. At the Fifth Congress in 1991, he became a full member of the Politburo, and he was appointed minister of national defence.

=== Minister of National Defence ===
Sayasone was re-elected to the Politburo at the Sixth Congress in 1996, and he remained defence minister. He was also a deputy prime minister from March 1998 to 2001. As defence minister, he met Lê Khả Phiêu, then a senior Vietnamese military leader, many times to discuss cooperation between the two countries' parties, states and armies. Douangchay Phichit, a career officer from Sayasone's home district, advanced through the army under him, and he reportedly owed his position to Siphandone and Sayasone.

=== Vice President ===
At the Seventh Congress in 2001, Sayasone was re-elected to the Politburo, and he became vice president under Siphandone.

== General Secretary and President ==
=== Succession ===
The LPRP's Eighth Congress opened on 18 March 2006. The 82-year-old Khamtai stepped down, and Sayasone, then vice president, replaced him as party leader. According to the historian Martin Stuart-Fox, Sayasone was a protégé and close confidant of Khamtai in both the army and the party, and like Khamtai, he came from southern Laos.

After National Assembly elections on 30 April 2006, the new assembly elected Sayasone, then aged 70, as president at its first session in June, with Bounnhang Vorachith as vice president. Bouasone Bouphavanh became prime minister with the support of Siphandone and Sayasone.

=== Foreign relations ===
In June 2006, Sayasone made his first foreign visit as party leader to Vietnam, where he met the Vietnamese party leader Nông Đức Mạnh and President Trần Đức Lương, who awarded him the Gold Star Order, Vietnam's highest honour. He and the prime minister then went directly to China, and he made a week-long official visit to China in June. President of China Hu Jintao later visited Vientiane and promised between US$250 million and US$400 million in concessional loans, debt relief and direct aid. Stuart-Fox wrote that Lao leaders did not see a choice between Vietnam and China, and that they agreed on the need to balance relations with both.

In 2009, relations between Laos and China were raised to a comprehensive strategic cooperative partnership. During Sayasone's official visit to China in September 2011, which marked 50 years of diplomatic relations, he held talks with Hu Jintao, and China declared its support for Laos's hosting of the 2012 Asia–Europe Meeting summit and for its bid to join the World Trade Organization (WTO). In August 2015, he travelled to Beijing for the commemorations of the 70th anniversary of the victory over Japan, and he held talks with Xi Jinping. He made another official visit to Vietnam in December 2012.

In October 2013, Sayasone made a five-day official visit to France, the first by a Lao head of state, and he met President François Hollande at the Élysée Palace on 22 October. Before the visit, the French foreign ministry called on the Lao authorities to shed light on the disappearance of Sombath Somphone, a civil society leader who had not been seen since December 2012, and several non-governmental organizations used the visit to draw attention to human rights in Laos. The Lao authorities denied any involvement in his disappearance.

In October 2015, Sayasone made an official visit to Cuba, where President Raúl Castro received him and he was awarded the Order of José Martí. In February 2016, he attended the ASEAN leaders' summit with the United States at Sunnylands, California.

=== Domestic affairs ===
In December 2010, Thongsing Thammavong was appointed prime minister, a change that some analysts saw as favouring pro-Vietnamese factions, although others disputed this reading. In March 2011, the LPRP's Ninth Congress unanimously re-elected Sayasone as general secretary. The congress adopted a target of annual economic growth of about 8 per cent for 2011 to 2015, and it reaffirmed the aim of reaching middle-income status by 2020. Stuart-Fox said that the congress reinforced the party and the army and did not signal any move towards democracy. In June 2011, the National Assembly re-elected Sayasone as president.

Laos joined the WTO as its 158th member on 2 February 2013, after 15 years of negotiations. According to the scholars Soulatha Sayalath and Simon Creak, the concentration of power in Sayasone's hands helped several of his family members to gain promotions, including his eldest son, Vidong Sayasone, who became a provincial party secretary and later a member of the Central Committee.

In his political report to the Tenth Congress in January 2016, Sayasone cited a rise in per capita income to US$1,970 in 2015, a fall in the proportion of poor households to 6.59 per cent, the launch of the communications satellite Lao Sat-1 and the groundbreaking of a railway to China. Sayalath and Creak wrote that the report made clear that the party's main claim to legitimacy was rapid economic growth.

=== Retirement ===
Sayasone did not seek re-election to the Central Committee at the Tenth Congress in January 2016, which marked his retirement. He stepped down as general secretary under the party rule that its leader cannot serve more than two consecutive terms. On 22 January 2016, the congress elected Bounnhang to succeed him. In April 2016, the National Assembly elected Bounnhang to succeed him as president. After the congress, Sayasone and three other retiring Politburo members were named advisers to the Central Committee, a move that Sayalath and Creak suggested could preserve the influence of the party's old guard.

== Later life ==
On 4 April 2021, a yacht carrying Sayasone and members of his family capsized in a storm on the Nam Ngum reservoir, about 60 kilometres (37 mi) north of Vientiane, after they had left a family event at a nearby resort. Although he was initially feared dead, he was rescued and taken to hospital. Eight people died, most of them members of his family, including his wife, Keosaychay Sayasone, and his son Vidong, a former governor and party secretary of Vientiane Province. Their funerals were held on 8 April at That Foun Temple in Vientiane.

== Personal life ==
Sayasone was married to Keosaychay Sayasone until her death in 2021. Their son Vidong died in the same accident, and another son, Phokham Sayasone, became party chief of Sisattanak district.

== Awards and honors ==
- Cuba:
  - Order of José Martí (2015)
- Vietnam:
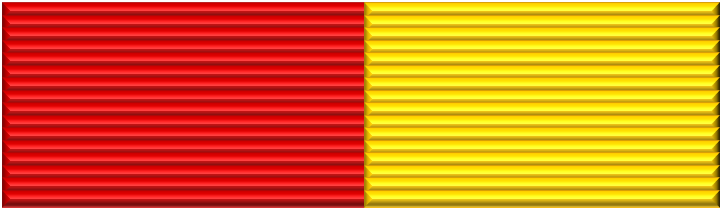
  - Gold Star Order (2006)

Party political offices
Preceded by Khamtai Siphandon	General Secretary of the People's Revolutionary Party; 2006–2016	Succeeded by Bounnhang Vorachith
Political offices
Preceded by Khamtai Siphandon	Minister for Defence; 1991–2001	Succeeded by Douangchay Phichit
Preceded by Oudom Khattigna	Vice President of Laos; 2001–2006	Succeeded by Bounnhang Vorachith
Preceded by Khamtai Siphandon	President of Laos; 2006–2016	Succeeded by Bounnhang Vorachith
