= 2nd Government of Laos =

- 1989–1993
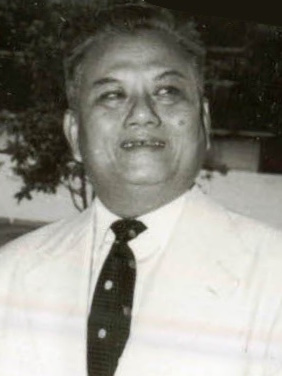
- Kaysone Phomvihane
- Date formed: 1 June 1989
- Date dissolved: 25 February 1993

People and organisations
- President: Nouhak Phoumsavanh; Kaysone Phomvihane
- Prime Minister: Khamtai Siphandon; Kaysone Phomvihane
- Deputy Prime Minister: Nouhak Phoumsavanh; Phoumi Vongvichit; Khamtai Siphandon; Somsavat Lengsavad; Sali Vongkhamsao
- Member party: Lao People's Revolutionary Party

History
- Election: 1989 Election of Deputies
- Legislature term: 2nd National Assembly
- Predecessor: First Government
- Successor: Third Government

The Second Government of the Lao People's Democratic Republic was established on 1 June 1989.

== Ministries ==
Ministry	Minister	Took office	Left office
Prime Minister	Kaysone Phomvihane	1 June 1989	15 August 1991
Prime Minister	Khamtai Siphandon	15 August 1991	25 February 1993
First Deputy Prime Minister	Nouhak Phoumsavanh	1 June 1989	15 August 1991
Deputy Prime Minister	Phoumi Vongvichit	1 June 1989	15 August 1991
Deputy Prime Minister	Khamtai Siphandon	1 June 1989	25 February 1993
Deputy Prime Minister	Phoun Sipaseut	1 June 1989	25 February 1993
Deputy Prime Minister	Sali Vongkhamsao	1 June 1989	23 January 1991
Minister of Foreign Affairs	Phoun Sipaseut	1 June 1989	25 February 1993
Ministry of Economics, Planning, and Finance	Sali Vongkhamsao	1 June 1989	23 January 1991
Ministry of Economics, Planning, and Finance	Khamphoui Keoboualapha	23 January 1991	15 August 1991
Ministry of Finance	Khamsay Souphanouvong	15 August 1991	25 February 1993
Minister of Interior	Asang Laoli	1 June 1989	25 February 1993
Minister of Defense	Khamtai Siphandon	1 June 1989	15 August 1991
Minister of Defense	Choummaly Sayasone	15 August 1991	25 February 1993
Minister of Commerce and Foreign Economic Relations	Phao Bounnaphon	1 June 1989	25 February 1993
Minister of Agriculture, Forestry, Irrigation and Co-operatives	Inkonf Mahavong	1 June 1989	1991
Minister of Agriculture, Forestry, Irrigation and Co-operatives	Sisavath Keobounphanh	1991	25 February 1993
Minister of Industry and Handicrafts	Soulivong Daravong	1 June 1989	25 February 1993
Minister of Transport and Communications	Oudom Khattigna	1 June 1989	25 February 1993
Minister of Education	Samane Vignaket	1 June 1989	1991
Minister of Education	?	1991	?
Minister of Health and Welfare	Khamkou Sounikay	1 June 1989	25 February 1993
Minister of Culture	Thongsing Thammavong	1 June 1989	25 February 1993
Minister of Justice	Kou Souvannamethi	1 June 1989	25 February 1993

== Committees ==
Ministry	Minister	Took office	Left office
President of the Committee for Planning and Cooperation	Khamphoui Keoboualapha	15 August 1991	25 February 1993
Governor of the State Bank	Pany Yathotou	1 June 1989	1992
Governor of the State Bank	Bousabong Souvannavong	1992	25 February 1993
