= 5th Central Committee of the Lao People's Revolutionary Party =

The 5th Central Committee of the Lao People's Revolutionary Party (LPRP) was elected at the 5th LPRP National Congress in 1991. It was composed of 55 members and four alternates.

== Members ==
Rank	Name	Akson Lao	4th CC		6th CC		Gender
Rank	Name	Akson Lao	Change	Rank	Change	Rank	Gender
1	Kaysone Phomvihane	ໄກສອນ ພົມວິຫານ	Old	1	Died	—	Male
2	Nouhak Phoumsavanh	ໜູຮັກ ພູມສະຫວັນ	Old	2	Retired	—	Male
3	Khamtai Siphandon	ຄໍາໄຕ ສີພັນດອນ	Old	5	Reelected	1	Male
4	Phoun Sipaseut	ພູນ ສີປະເສີດ	Old	6	Died	—	Male
5	Maichantan Sengmani	ໄມຈັນຕານ ແສງມະນີ	Old	10	Died	—	Male
6	Samane Vignaket	ສະໝານ ວິຍະເກດ	Old	11	Reelected	2	Male
7	Oudom Khattigna	ອຸດົມ ຂັດຕິຍະ	Old	12	Reelected	4	Male
8	Choummaly Sayasone	ຈູມມາລີ ໄຊຍະສອນ	Old	13	Reelected	3	Male
9	Somlat Chanthamat	ສົມລັດ ຈັນທະມາດ	Old	14	Died	—	Male
10	Khamphoui Keoboualapha	ຄາໍຜຸຍ ແກ້ວບົວລະພາ	Old	43	Not	—	Male
11	Thongsing Thammavong	ທອງສິງ ທາໍມະວົງ	Old	37	Reelected	5	Male
12	Osakanh Thammatheva	ໂອສະກັນ ທາໍມະເທວາ	Old	25	Reelected	6	Male
13	Vongphet Saikeuyachongtoua	ວົງເພັດ ໄຊເກີຢາຈົງຕົວ	Old	27	Reelected	10	Male
14	Bounnhang Vorachit	ບຸນຍັງ ວໍລະຈິດ	Old	15	Reelected	7	Male
15	Sisavath Keobounphanh	ສີສະຫວາດ ແກ້ວບຸນພັນ	Old	8	Reelected	8	Male
16	Phao Bounnaphon	ເພົ້າ ບຸນນະຜົນ	Old	26	Retired	—	Male
17	Asang Laoly	ອາຊາງ ລາວລີ	Old	17	Reelected	9	Male
18	Maisouk Saisompheng	ໄມສຸກ ໄຊສົມແພງ	Old	18	Retired	—	Male
19	Khambou Sounisai	ຄາໍບູ ສຸນີໄຊ	Old	22	Reelected	11	Male
20	Ai Soulignaseng	ໄອ່ ສຸລິຍະແສງ	Old	42	Retired	—	Male
21	Nakhon Sisanon	ນະຄອນ ສີສະນົນ	Old	31	Reelected	13	Male
22	Inpong Khaignavong	ອິນປົງ ໄຄ້ຍະວົງ	Old	44	Reelected	14	Male
23	Thongsavat Khaikhamphithoun	ທອງສະຫວັດ ໄຂຄາໍພິທູນ	Old	33	Retired	—	Male
24	Yao Phonvantha	ຢາວ ພອນວັນທາ	Old	34	Retired	—	Male
25	Inkong Mahavong	ອິນກອງ ມະທາວົງ	Old	16	Retired	—	Male
26	Siphon Phalikhan	ສີພອນ ຜາລີຂັນ	Old	21	Retired	—	Male
27	Thongloun Sisoulith	ທອງລຸນ ອີສຸລິດ	Old	47	Reelected	15	Male
28	Khamphon Boutdakham	ຄາໍຜົນ ບຸດດາຄາໍ	Old	39	Retired	—	Male
29	Phimmasone Leuangkhamma	ພິມມະສອນ ເລືອງຄາໍມາ	Old	48	Reelected	16	Male
30	Bouathong Vonglokham	ບົວທອງ ວົງລໍຄາ໋	Old	49	Reelected	32	Male
31	Onechanh Thammavong	ອ່ອນຈັນ ທາໍມະວົງ	Old	50	Reelected	17	Female
32	Thongmani Thiphommachan	ທອງມະນີ ທິພົມມະຈັນ	Old	40	Retired	—	Male
33	Ounla Saignasan	ອຸ່ນທລ້າ ໄຊຍະສານ	Old	51	Reelected	33	Male
34	Khamsay Souphanouvong	ຄາໍໄຊ ສຸພານຸວົງ	Alt.	52	Not	—	Male
35	Sone Khamvanevongsa	ສອນ ຄາໍວານວົງສາ	Alt.	53	Not	—	Male
36	Chaleun Yiapaoher	ຈະເລີນ ເຢຍປາວເຮີ	Alt.	55	Reelected	34	Male
37	Pany Yathotou	ປານີ ຢາທໍ່ຕູ້	Alt.	54	Reelected	20	Female
38	Khampane Philavong	ຄາໍປານ ພິລາວົງ	Old	46	Reelected	18	Male
39	Siangsom Kounlavong	ຊຽງສົມ ກຸນລະວົງ	Old	45	Not	—	Male
40	Somphanh Phengkhammy	ສົມພັນ ແພງຄາໍມີ	Alt.	56	Reelected	21	Male
41	Bounheuang Douangphachanh	ບຸນເຮືອງ ດວງພະຈັນ	Alt.	57	Reelected	23	Male
42	Phimpha Thepkhamheuang	ພິມພາ ເທບຄາໍເຮືອງ	Alt.	58	Not	—	Male
43	Khammanh Sounvileuth	ຄາໍພນັ້ນ ສູນວິເລີດ	Alt.	59	Reelected	25	Male
44	Khamphong Phanvongsa	ຄາໍຜອງ ພັນວົງສາ	Alt.	60	Not	—	Male
45	Saysomphone Phomvihane	ໄຊສົມພອນ ພົມວິທານ	New	—	Reelected	24	Male
46	Thongvang Sihachak	ທອງທວັງ ສີທາຈັກ	New	—	Reelected	26	Male
47	Chansy Phosikham	ຈັນສີ ໂພສີຄາໍ	New	—	Reelected	27	Male
48	Oneneua Phommachanh	ອ່ອນເນື້ອ ພົມມະຈັນ	New	—	Reelected	28	Male
49	Phoumi Thipphavone	ພູມີ ທິບພະວອນ	New	—	Reelected	31	Male
50	Sileua Bounkham	ສີເຫລືອ ບຸນຄາ	New	—	Reelected	19	Male
51	Somsavat Lengsavad	ສົມສະທວາດ ເລັງສະຫວັດ	New	—	Reelected	12	Male
52	Somphet Thipmala	ສົມເພັດ ທິບມາລາ	New	—	Reelected	30	Male
53	Douangchay Phichit	ດວງໄຈ ພິຈິດ	New	—	Reelected	22	Male
54	Soulivong Daravong	ສຸລິວົງ ດາລາວົງ	New	—	Reelected	36	Male
55	Mounkeo Oraboun	ບນຼນແກ້ວ ອໍລະບູນ	New	—	Reelected	29	Male

=== Alternates ===
Rank	Name	Akson Lao	6th CC		Gender
Rank	Name	Akson Lao	Change	Rank	Gender
1	Thongsi Inthaphon	ທອງສີ ອິນທະພົມ	Member	35	Male
2	Thongdam Chanthaphon	ທອງດາໍ ຈັນທະພອນ	Not	—	Male
3	Davone Vongsack	ດາວອນ ວົງສັກ	Member	37	Female
4	Bounpheng Mounphosay	ບຸນເພັງ ມູນໂພໄຊ	Member	38	Female
