= 4th Central Committee of the Lao People's Revolutionary Party =

The 4th Central Committee of the Lao People's Revolutionary Party (LPRP) was elected at the 4th LPRP National Congress in 1986. It was composed of 51 members and nine alternates.

== Members ==
Rank	Name	Akson Lao	3rd CC		5th CC		Gender
Rank	Name	Akson Lao	Change	Rank	Change	Rank	Gender
1	Kaysone Phomvihane	ໄກສອນ ພົມວິຫານ	Old	1	Reelected	1	Male
2	Nouhak Phoumsavanh	ໜູຮັກ ພູມສະຫວັນ	Old	2	Reelected	2	Male
3	Souphanouvong	ສຸພານຸວົງ	Old	3	Retired	—	Male
4	Phoumi Vongvichit	ພູມີ ວົງວິຈິດ	Old	4	Retired	—	Male
5	Khamtai Siphandone	ຄໍາໄຕ ສີພັນດອນ	Old	5	Reelected	3	Male
6	Phoun Sipaseut	ພູນ ສີປະເສີດ	Old	6	Reelected	4	Male
7	Sisomphon Lovansay	ສີສົມພອນ ລໍວັນໄຊ	Old	7	Retired	—	Male
8	Sisavath Keobounphanh	ສີສະຫວາດ ແກ້ວບຸນພັນ	Old	9	Reelected	15	Male
9	Sali Vongkhamsao	ສາລີ ວົງຄໍາຊາວ	Old	8	Died	—	Male
10	Maichantan Sengmani	ໄມຈັນຕານ ແສງມະນີ	Old	11	Reelected	5	Male
11	Samane Vignaket	ສະໝານ ວິຍະເກດ	Old	10	Reelected	6	Male
12	Oudom Khattigna	ອຸດົມ ຂັດຕິຍະ	Old	37	Reelected	7	Male
13	Choummaly Sayasone	ຈູມມາລີ ໄຊຍະສອນ	Old	43	Reelected	8	Male
14	Somlat Chanthamat	ສົມລັດ ຈັນທະມາດ	Old	28	Reelected	9	Male
15	Bounnhang Vorachit	ບຸນຍັງ ວໍລະຈິດ	Old	40	Reelected	14	Male
16	Inkong Mahavong		Old	47	Retired	25	Male
17	Asang Laoly	ອາຊາງ ລາວລີ	Old	49	Reelected	17	Male
18	Maisouk Saisompheng	ໄມສຸກ ໄຊສົມແພງ	Old	12	Retired	18	Male
19	Sounthon Thepasa		Old	20	Retired	—	Male
20	Bolang Boualapha		Old	19	Retired	—	Male
21	Siphon Phalikhan		Old	24	Reelected	26	Male
22	Khambou Sounisai		Old	25	Reelected	19	Male
23	Phetsamon Lasasimma		Old	34	Retired	—	Female
24	Khamphay Boupha	ຄຳເພັງ ບຸບຜາ	Old	31	Retired	—	Male
25	Osakanh Thammatheva	ໂອສະກັນ ທໍາມະເທວາ	Old	46	Reelected	12	Male
26	Phao Bounnaphon	ເພາ ບຸນນະຜົນ	Alt.	50	Reelected	16	Male
27	Vongphet Saikeuyachongtoua		Old	35	Reelected	13	Male
28	Sompheng Keobounhouan		Old	36	Retired	—	Male
29	Bouangeun Livitmuang		Old	41	Retired	—	Male
30	Khampha Chalunphonmisai		Old	42	Retired	—	Male
31	Nakhon Sisanon		Old	44	Reelected	21	Male
32	Khamban Chanthason		Old	48	Retired	—	Male
33	Thongsavat Khaikhamphithoun		Old	29	Retired	23	Male
34	Yao Phonvantha		Alt.	51	Retired	24	Male
35	Thongvin Phomvihane		Old	30	Retired	—	Female
36	Loun Chaksouvon		Old	39	Retired	—	Female
37	Thongsing Thammavong	ທອງສີງ ທໍາມະວົງ	Alt.	54	Reelected	11	Male
38	Soi Sombatdouang		Alt.	55	Not	—	Male
39	Khamphon Boutdakham		Alt.	53	Not	28	Male
40	Thongmani Thiphommachan		Alt.	52	Not	32	Male
41	Thonglai Kommasith		New	—	Not	—	Male
42	Ai Soulignaseng		New	—	Not	20	Male
43	Khamphoui Keoboualapha	ຄໍາຜຸຍ ແກ້ວບົວລະພາ	New	—	Reelected	10	Male
44	Inpong Khaignavong		New	—	Reelected	22	Male
45	Siangsom Kounlavong		New	—	Not	39	Male
46	Khampane Philavong		New	—	Reelected	38	Male
47	Thongloun Sisoulith	ທອງລຸນ ສີສຸລິດ	New	—	Reelected	27	Male
48	Phimmasone Leuangkhamma		New	—	Reelected	29	Male
49	Bouathong Vonglokham	ບົວທອງ ວົງລໍຄຳ	New	—	Reelected	30	Male
50	Onechanh Thammavong	ອ່ອນຈັນ ທຳມະວົງ	New	—	Reelected	31	Female
51	Ounla Saignasan		New	—	Reelected	33	Male

=== Alternates ===
Rank	Name	Akson Lao	5th CC		Gender
Rank	Name	Akson Lao	Change	Rank	Gender
1	Khamsay Souphanouvong	ຄຳໄຊ ສຸພານຸວົງ	Member	34	Male
2	Sone Khamvanevongsa	ສອນ ຄາ໋ວານວົງສາ	Member	35	Male
3	Pany Yathotou	ປານີ ຢາທໍ່ຕູ້	Member	37	Female
4	Chaleun Yiapaoher	ຈະເລີນ ເຢຍປາວເຮີ	Member	36	Male
5	Somphanh Phengkhammy	ສົມພັນ ແພງຄຳມີ	Member	40	Male
6	Bounheuang Douangphachan	ດວງສະຫວັດ ສຸພານຸວົງ	Member	41	Male
7	Phimpha Thepkhamheuang	ພິມພາ ເທບຄາໍເຮືອງ	Member	42	Male
8	Khammanh Sounvileuth	ຄຳໝັ້ນ ສູນວິເລີດ	Member	43	Male
9	Khamphong Phanvongsa	ຄາໍຜອງ ພັນວົງສາ	Member	44	Male
