= 6th Central Committee of the Lao People's Revolutionary Party =

Elected at 1996 National Congress

The 6th Central Committee of the Lao People's Revolutionary Party (LPRP) was elected at the 6th LPRP National Congress in 1996.

== Members ==
Rank	Name	Akson Lao	5th CC		7th CC		Gender
Rank	Name	Akson Lao	Change	Rank	Change	Rank	Gender
1	Khamtai Siphandon	ຄຳໄຕ ສີພັນດອນ	Old	3	Reelected	1	Male
2	Samane Vignaket	ສະໝານ ວິຍະເກດ	Old	6	Reelected	2	Male
3	Choummaly Sayasone	ຈູມມະລີ ໄຊຍະສອນ	Old	8	Reelected	3	Male
4	Oudom Khattigna	ອຸດົມ ຂັດຕິຍະ	Old	7	Died	—	Male
5	Thongsing Thammavong	ທອງສີງ ທໍາມະວົງ	Old	11	Reelected	4	Male
6	Osakanh Thammatheva	ໂອສະກັນ ທໍາມະເທວາ	Old	12	Reelected	5	Male
7	Bounnhang Vorachit	ບຸນຍັງ ວໍລະຈິດ	Old	14	Reelected	6	Male
8	Sisavath Keobounphanh	ສີສະຫວາດ ແກ້ວບຸນພັນ	Old	15	Reelected	7	Male
9	Asang Laoly	ອາຊາງ ລາວລີ	Old	17	Reelected	8	Male
10	Vongphet Saikeuyachongtoua		Old	13	Reelected	12	Male
11	Khambou Sounisai		Old	19	Retired	—	Male
12	Somsavat Lengsavad	ສົມສະຫວາດ ເລັ່ງສະຫວັດ	Old	51	Reelected	13	Male
13	Nakhon Sisanon		Old	21	Retired	—	Male
14	Inpong Khaignavong		Old	22	Retired	—	Male
15	Thongloun Sisoulith	ທອງລຸນ ສີສຸລິດ	Old	27	Reelected	9	Male
16	Phimmasone Leuangkhamma	ພິມມະສອນ ເລືອງຄຳມາ	Old	29	Reelected	18	Male
17	Onechanh Thammavong	ອ່ອນຈັນ ທຳມະວົງ	Old	31	Reelected	15	Female
18	Khampane Philavong		Old	38	Reelected	19	Male
19	Sileua Bounkham	ສີເຫຼືອ ບຸນຄ້ໍາ	Old	50	Reelected	16	Male
20	Pany Yathotou	ປານີ ຢາທໍ່ຕູ້	Old	37	Reelected	21	Female
21	Somphanh Phengkhammy	ສົມພັນ ແພງຄຳມີ	Old	40	Reelected	20	Male
22	Douangchay Phichit	ດວງໃຈ ພິຈິດ	Old	53	Reelected	10	Male
23	Bounheuang Douangphachanh	ດວງສະຫວັດ ສຸພານຸວົງ	Old	41	Reelected	14	Male
24	Saysomphone Phomvihane	ໄຊສົມພອນ ພົມວິຫານ	Old	45	Reelected	22	Male
25	Khammanh Sounvileuth	ຄຳໝັ້ນ ສູນວິເລີດ	Old	43	Reelected	23	Male
26	Thongvang Sihachak		Old	46	Reelected	24	Male
27	Chansy Phosikham	ຈັນສີ ໂພສີຄຳ	Old	47	Reelected	17	Male
28	Oneneua Phommachanh		Old	48	Reelected	25	Male
29	Mounkeo Oraboun	ໝູນແກ້ວ ອໍລະບູນ	Old	55	Reelected	26	Male
30	Somphet Thipmala		Old	52	Reelected	27	Male
31	Phoumi Thipphavone	ພູມີ ທິບພະວອນ	Old	49	Reelected	28	Male
32	Bouathong Vonglokham	ບົວທອງ ວົງລໍຄຳ	Old	30	Reelected	29	Male
33	Ounla Saignasan		Old	33	Retired	—	Male
34	Chaleun Yiapaoher	ຈະເລີນ ເຢຍປາວເຮີ	Old	36	Reelected	30	Male
35	Thongsi Inthaphon		Alt.	56	Not	—	Male
36	Soulivong Daravong	ສຸລິວົງ ດາລາວົງ	Old	54	Reelected	32	Male
37	Davone Vongsack		Alt.	58	Not	—	Female
38	Bounpheng Mounphosay	ບຸນເພັງ ມູນໂພໄຊ	Alt.	59	Reelected	33	Female
39	Soukanh Mahalath	ສຸກັນ ມະຫາລາດ	New	—	Reelected	31	Male
40	Bouasone Bouphavanh	ບົວສອນ ບູບຜາວັນ	New	—	Reelected	11	Male
41	Bounthong Chitmany	ບຸນທອງ ຈິດມະນີ	New	—	Reelected	34	Male
42	Soutchay Thammasith		New	—	Reelected	—	Male
43	Khamphouang Chanthaphomma		New	—	Reelected	—	Male
44	Phandouangchit Vongsa	ພັນດວງຈິດ ວົງສາ	New	—	Reelected	35	Male
45	Khea Phalivong		New	—	Not	—	Male
46	Bounpone Bouttanavong	ບຸນປອນ ບຸດຕະນະວົງ	New	—	Reelected	36	Male
47	Khamkeut Veunkham		New	—	Reelected	37	Male
48	Khamboun Douangpanya	ຄຳບຸ່ນ ດ້ວງປັນຍາ	New	—	Reelected	38	Male
49	Sengnyong Vongchanhkham		New	—	Not	39	Male
