= 3rd Central Committee of the Lao People's Revolutionary Party =

Political party in Laos

The 3rd Central Committee of the Lao People's Revolutionary Party (LPRP) was elected at the 3rd LPRP National Congress in 1982. It was composed of 49 members and six alternates.

== Members ==
Rank	Name	Akson Lao	2nd CC	4th CC	Gender
1	Kaysone Phomvihane	ໄກສອນ ພົມວິຫານ	Old	Reelected	Male
2	Nouhak Phoumsavanh	ໜູຮັກ ພູມສະຫວັນ	Old	Reelected	Male
3	Souphanouvong	ສຸພານຸວົງ	Old	Reelected	Male
4	Phoumi Vongvichit	ພູມີ ວົງວິຈິດ	Old	Reelected	Male
5	Khamtai Siphandon	ຄໍາໄຕ ສີພັນດອນ	Old	Reelected	Male
6	Phoun Sipaseut	ພູນ ສີປະເສີດ	Old	Reelected	Male
7	Sisomphon Lovansay	ສີສົມພອນ ລໍວັນໄຊ	Old	Reelected	Male
8	Sali Vongkhamsao	ສາລີ ວົງຄໍາຊາວ	Old	Reelected	Male
9	Sisavath Keobounphanh	ສີສະຫວາດ ແກ້ວບຸນພັນ	Old	Reelected	Male
10	Samane Vignaket	ສະໝານ ວິຍະເກດ	Old	Reelected	Male
11	Maichantan Sengmany	ໄມຈັນຕານ ແສງມະນີ	Old	Reelected	Male
12	Maisouk Saisompheng	ໄມສຸກ ໄຊສົມແພງ	Old	Reelected	Male
13	Chanmi Douangboutdi	ຈັນມີ ດວງບຸດດີ	Old	Not	Male
14	Thit Mouan Saochanthala	ທິດມ່ວນ ສາວຈັນທະລາ	Old	Not	Male
15	Souk Vongsak	ເຈົ້າສຸກ ວົງສັກ	Old	Not	Male
16	Meun Somvichit	ໝື່ນ ສົນວິຈິດ	Old	Not	Male
17	Ma Khaikhamphithoun	ມາ ໄຂຄຳພິທູນ	Old	Not	Male
18	Khamsouk Saignaseng	ຄຳສຸກ ໄຊຍະແສງ	Old	Not	Male
19	Boualang Boualapha	ບົວລາງ ບົວລະພາ	Old	Reelected	Male
20	Sounthon Thepasa	ສູນທອນ ເທບອາສາ	Old	Reelected	Male
21	Sanan Soutthichak	ສະນັ່ນ ສຸດທິຈັກ	Old	Died	Male
22	Khampheng Boupha	ຄຳແພງ ບຸບຜາ	Old	Retired	Female
23	Nhiavu Lobliayao	ເຍຍວື ລໍເບຼຍຢາວ	Alt.	Not	Male
24	Siphon Phalikhan	ສີພອນ ຜາລີຂັນ	Alt.	Reelected	Male
25	Khambou Sounisai	ຄຳບູ່ ສຸນີໄຊ	Alt.	Reelected	Male
26	Sisana Sisane	ສີສະນະ ສີສານ	Alt.	Not	Male
27	Somsak Saisongkham	ສົມສັກ ໄຊສົງຄາມ	Alt.	Not	Male
28	Somlat Chanthamat	ສົມລັດ ຈັນທະມາດ	New	Not	Male
29	Thongsavat Khaikhamphithoun	ທອງສະຫວັດ ່ໄຂຄຳພິທູນ	New	Reelected	Male
30	Thongvin Phomvihane	ທອງວິນ ພົມວິຫານ	New	Reelected	Female
31	Khamphay Boupha	ຄຳເພັງ ບຸບຜາ	Alt.	Reelected	Male
32	Vanthong Sengmuang	ວັນທອງ ະສງມືອງ	New	Not	Male
33	Khamta Douangthongla	ຄຳຕາ ດວງທອງລາ	New	Not	Male
34	Phetsamon Lasasimma	ເພັດສະໝອນ ລາຊະສີມມາ	New	Reelected	Female
35	Vongphet Saikeuyachongtoua	ວົງເພັດ ໄຊເກີຢາຈົງຕົວ	New	Reelected	Male
36	Sompheng Keobounhouan	ສົມແພງ ແຂັວບຸນຫວນ	New	Reelected	Male
37	Oudom Khattigna	ອຸດົມ ຂັດຕິຍະ	New	Reelected	Male
38	Saignavong	ເຊຍະວົງ	New	Reelected	Male
39	Kang Loun	ກາງ ລຸນ	New	Reelected	Female
40	Bounnhang Vorachit	ບຸນຍັງ ວໍລະຈິດ	New	Reelected	Male
41	Bôgneun Léviatmouang	ໂບເຍີນ ເລຫວຽດມ່ວງ	New	Reelected	Male
42	Khampha Chaleunphonmisai	ຄຳພາ ຈະເລີນພົນມີໄຊ	New	Reelected	Male
43	Choummaly Sayasone	ຈູມມາລີ ໄຊຍະສອນ	New	Reelected	Male
44	Nakhon Sisanon	ນະຄອນ ສີສະນົນ	New	Reelected	Male
45	Sithon Manola	ສີທົນ ມະໂນລາ	New	Not	Male
46	Osakanh Thammatheva	ໂອສະກັນ ທໍາມະເທວາ	New	Reelected	Male
47	Inkong Mahavong	ອິນກອງ ມະຫາວົງ	New	Reelected	Male
48	Khamban Chanthason	ຄຳບານ ຈັນທະສອນ	New	Reelected	Male
49	Asang Laoly	ອາຊາງ ລາວລີ	New	Reelected	Male

=== Alternates ===
Rank	Name	Akson Lao	4th CC	Gender
1	Phao Bounnaphon	ເພາ ບຸນນະຜົນ	Member	Male
2	Yao Phonvantha	ຢາວ ພອນວັນທາ	Member	Male
3	Thongmani Thiphommachan	ທອງມະນີ ທິພົມມະຈັນ	Member	Male
4	Khamphon Boutdakham	ຄຳຜົນ ບຸດດະຄຳ	Member	Male
5	Thongsing Thammavong	ທອງສິງ ທຳມະວົງ	Member	Male
6	Thitsoi Sombatdouang	ທີດສ້ອຍ ສົມບັດດວງ	Member	Male
