= 1st Government of Laos =

Political administration

The First Government of the Lao People's Democratic Republic was established on 2 December 1975.

== Members ==
Ministry	Minister	Took office	Left office
Prime Minister	Kaysone Phomvihane	2 December 1975	1 June 1989
First Deputy Prime Minister	Nouhak Phoumsavan	January 1982	1 June 1989
Deputy Prime Minister	Nouhak Phoumsavan	2 December 1975	January 1982
Deputy Prime Minister	Phoumi Vongvichit	2 December 1975	1 June 1989
Deputy Prime Minister and Minister of Foreign Affairs	Phoun Sipraseuth	2 December 1975	1 June 1989
Deputy Prime Minister and Minister of Defense	Khamtay Siphandon	2 December 1975	1 June 1989
Deputy Prime Minister	Sali Vongkhamxao	1982	1 June 1989
Minister of Education	Phoumi Vongvichit	2 December 1975	January 1982
Minister of Education	Bountiam Pitsami	January 1982	1988
Minister of Education	Samane Vignaket	1988	1 June 1989
Minister to the Office of the Prime Minister	Sali Vongkhamxao	2 December 1975	1982
Minister to the Office of the Prime Minister	Sisavath Keobounphanh	2 December 1975	1 June 1989
Minister to the Office of the Prime Minister	Chanmi Douangboutdi	2 December 1975	1 June 1989
Minister to the Office of the Prime Minister	Maichantan Sengmani	2 December 1975	1 June 1989
Minister of Finance	Nouhak Phoumsavan	2 December 1975	January 1982
Minister of Finance	Yao Phonvantha	January 1982	1 June 1989
Minister of Interior, Veterans, and Social Affairs	Somseun Khamphithoun	2 December 1975	?
Minister of Welfare and Social Affairs	?	?	?
Minister of Interior	Asang Laoli	1988	1 June 1989
Minister of Information, Propaganda, Culture, and Tourism	Sisana Sisane	2 December 1975	1 June 1989
Minister of Communications and Public Works	Sanan Soutthichak	2 December 1975	1 June 1989
Minister of Public Health	Souk Vongsak	2 December 1975	1983
Minister of Public Health	?	1983	?
Minister of Justice	Kou Souvannamethi	2 December 1975	1 June 1989
Minister of Construction	Khemphon Phouipaseut	January 1982	1 June 1989
Minister of Material Supply and Technics	Thongsouk Saysangkhi	January 1982	1 June 1989
Minister of Agriculture, Forestry, and Irrigation	Khamsouk Xainyaseng	2 December 1975	January 1982
Minister of Agriculture, Forestry, and Irrigation	lnkong Mahavong	January 1982	1 June 1989
Minister of Industry, Handicraft, and Forestry	Maisouk Xaisompheng	2 December 1975	1 June 1989
Minister of Posts and Telecommunications	Khampheng Boupha	2 December 1975	1979
Minister of Posts and Telecommunications	?	1979	?
President of the State Planning Committee	Ma Khaikhamphithoun	2 December 1975	1982
President of the State Planning Committee	Sali Vongkhamxao	1982	1 June 1989
President of the Nationalities Committee	Nhiaveu Lobliayao	2 December 1975	1 June 1989
President of the National Bank	Thongchan Ouplavan	2 December 1975	1 June 1989
