= 7th Central Committee of the Lao People's Revolutionary Party =

The 7th Central Committee of the Lao People's Revolutionary Party (LPRP) was elected at the 7th LPRP National Congress in 2001. It was composed of 53 members.

== Members ==
Rank	Name	Akson Lao	6th CC		8th CC		Gender
Rank	Name	Akson Lao	Change	Rank	Change	Rank	Gender
1	Khamtai Siphandon	ຄຳໄຕ ສີພັນດອນ	Old	1	Retired	—	Male
2	Samane Vignaket	ສະໝານ ວິຍະເກດ	Old	2	Reelected	2	Male
3	Choummaly Sayasone	ຈູມມະລີ ໄຊຍະສອນ	Old	3	Reelected	1	Male
4	Thongsing Thammavong	ທອງສິງ ທຳມະວົງ	Old	5	Reelected	3	Male
5	Osakanh Thammatheva	ສີສະຫວາດ ແກ້ວບຸນພັນ	Old	6	Died	—	Male
6	Bounnhang Vorachit	ບຸນຍັງ ວໍລະຈິດ	Old	7	Reelected	4	Male
7	Sisavath Keobounphanh	ສີສະຫວາດ ແກ້ວບຸນພັນ	Old	8	Reelected	5	Male
8	Asang Laoly	ອາຊາງ ລາວລີ	Old	9	Reelected	6	Male
9	Thongloun Sisoulith	ທອງລຸນ ສີສຸລິດ	Old	15	Reelected	8	Male
10	Douangchay Phichit	ດວງໃຈ ພິຈິດ	Old	22	Reelected	9	Male
11	Bouasone Bouphavanh	ບົວສອນ ບູບຜາວັນ	Old	40	Reelected	7	Male
12	Vongphet Saikeuyachongtoua		Old	10	Reelected	15	Male
13	Somsavat Lengsavad	ສົມສະຫວາດ ເລັ່ງສະຫວັດ	Old	12	Reelected	10	Male
14	Bounheuang Douangphachanh	ດວງສະຫວັດ ສຸພານຸວົງ	Old	23	Reelected	16	Male
15	Onechanh Thammavong	ອ່ອນຈັນ ທຳມະວົງ	Old	17	Reelected	17	Female
16	Sileua Bounkham	ສີເຫຼືອ ບຸນຄ້ໍາ	Old	19	Retired	—	Male
17	Chansy Phosikham	ຈັນສີ ໂພສີຄຳ	Old	27	Reelected	18	Male
18	Phimmasone Leuangkhamma	ພິມມະສອນ ເລືອງຄຳມາ	Old	16	Reelected	19	Male
19	Khampane Philavong		Old	18	Reelected	20	Male
20	Somphanh Phengkhammy	ສົມພັນ ແພງຄຳມີ	Old	21	Reelected	21	Male
21	Pany Yathotou	ປານີ ຢາທໍ່ຕູ້	Old	20	Reelected	11	Female
22	Saysomphone Phomvihane	ໄຊສົມພອນ ພົມວິຫານ	Old	24	Reelected	22	Male
23	Khammanh Sounvileuth	ຄຳໝັ້ນ ສູນວິເລີດ	Old	25	Reelected	23	Male
24	Thongvang Sihachak		Old	26	Retired	—	Male
25	Oneneua Phommachanh		Old	28	Retired	—	Male
26	Mounkeo Oraboun	ໝູນແກ້ວ ອໍລະບູນ	Old	29	Reelected	24	Male
27	Somphet Thipmala		Old	30	Reelected	25	Male
28	Phoumi Thipphavone	ພູມີ ທິບພະວອນ	Old	31	Retired	—	Male
29	Bouathong Vonglokham	ບົວທອງ ວົງລໍຄຳ	Old	32	Retired	—	Male
30	Chaleun Yiapaoher	ຈະເລີນ ເຢຍປາວເຮີ	Old	34	Reelected	26	Male
31	Soukanh Mahalath	ສຸກັນ ມະຫາລາດ	Old	39	Reelected	27	Male
32	Soulivong Daravong	ສຸລິວົງ ດາລາວົງ	Old	36	Reelected	28	Male
33	Bounpheng Mounphosay	ບຸນເພັງ ມູນໂພໄຊ	Old	38	Reelected	29	Female
34	Bounthong Chitmany	ບຸນທອງ ຈິດມະນີ	Old	41	Reelected	12	Male
35	Soutchay Thammasith	ບຸນທອງ ຈິດມະນີ	Old	42	Not	12	Male
36	Khamphouang Chanthaphomma	ບຸນທອງ ຈິດມະນີ	Old	43	Not	12	Male
37	Phandouangchit Vongsa	ພັນດວງຈິດ ວົງສາ	Old	44	Reelected	30	Male
38	Bounpone Bouttanavong	ບຸນປອນ ບຸດຕະນະວົງ	Old	46	Reelected	31	Male
39	Khamkeut Veunkham		Old	40	Retired	—	Male
40	Khamboun Douangpanya	ຄຳບຸ່ນ ດ້ວງປັນຍາ	Old	48	Reelected	32	Male
41	Sengnyong Vongchanhkham		Old	49	Retired	—	Male
42	Sombat Yialiher		New	—	Reelected	13	Male
43	Thongbanh Sengaphone	ທອງບັນ ແສງອາພອນ	New	—	Reelected	14	Male
44	Cheuying Vang		New	—	Not	—	Male
45	Le Kakanya		New	—	Not	—	Male
46	Boualane Silipanya		New	—	Not	—	Male
47	Kenekham Senglathone		New	—	Not	—	Male
48	Soubanh Srithirath	ສຸບັນ ສະຣິດທິຣາດ	New	—	Reelected	33	Male
49	Siane Saphangthong		New	—	Not	—	Male
50	Chanasamone Chanyalath	ຈັນສະໝອນ ຈັນຍາລາດ	New	—	Reelected	34	Male
51	Ponmek Dalaloy	ປອນເມກ ດາລາລອຍ	New	—	Reelected	35	Male
52	Venethong Luangvilay		New	—	Reelected	36	Male
53	Siho Bannavong		New	—	Not	—	Male

== Bibliography ==
- Stuart-Fox, Martin (2008). Historical Dictionary of Laos. Scarecrow Press. ISBN 978-0-81086-411-5.
- Yamada, Norihiko (2002). "第6章 ラオス人民革命党第7回大会—残された課題" [Chapter 6: The 7th National Congress of the Lao People's Revolutionary Party 7th and Challenges Ahead]. Vietnam and Laos after the 2001 National Congresses: Challenges Ahead (46). Institute of Developing Economies of the Ministry of Economy, Trade and Industry.
