= 6th Government of Laos =

- 2006–2011
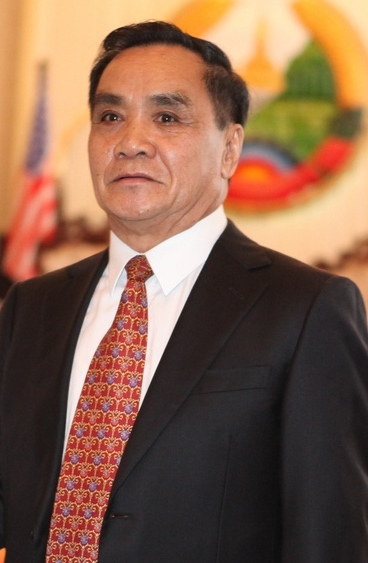
- Thongsing Thammavong
- Date formed: 8 June 2006
- Date dissolved: 15 June 2011

People and organisations
- President: Choummaly Sayasone
- Prime Minister: Thongsing Thammavong (2010–11); Bouasone Bouphavanh (2006–10)
- Deputy Prime Minister: Asang Laoli; Thongloun Sisoulith; Douangchay Phichit; Somsavat Lengsavad
- Member party: Lao People's Revolutionary Party

History
- Election: 2006 Election of Deputies
- Legislature term: 6th National Assembly
- Predecessor: Fifth
- Successor: Seventh

The Sixth Government of the Lao People's Democratic Republic was established on 8 June 2006.

== Ministries ==
Ministry	Minister	Took office	Left office
Prime Minister	Bouasone Bouphavanh	8 June 2006	23 December 2010
Prime Minister	Thongsing Thammavong	23 December 2010	15 June 2011
Deputy Prime Minister	Asang Laoli	8 June 2006	15 June 2011
Deputy Prime Minister and Minister of Foreign Affairs	Thongloun Sisoulith	8 June 2006	15 June 2011
Deputy Prime Minister and Minister of Defense	Douangchay Phichit	8 June 2006	15 June 2011
Deputy Prime Minister and Standing Member of the Government	Somsavat Lengsavad	8 June 2006	15 June 2011
Minister of Public Security	Thongban Sengaphone	8 June 2006	15 June 2011
Minister of Labor and Social Welfare	Onchanh Thammavong	8 June 2006	15 June 2011
Ministry of Finance	Chansy Phosikham	8 June 2006	3 July 2007
Ministry of Finance	Somdy Douangdy	3 July 2007	15 June 2011
Minister of Information and Culture	Mounkeo Orlaboun	8 June 2006	15 June 2011
Minister of Justice	Chaleun Yiapaoher	8 June 2006	15 June 2011
Minister of Public Health	Phonmek Daraloy	8 June 2006	15 June 2011
Minister of Education	Somkot Mangnormek	8 June 2006	15 June 2011
Minister of Industry and Commerce	Nam Vignaket	8 June 2006	15 June 2011
Minister of Energy and Minerals	Bosaykham Vongdara	8 June 2006	15 June 2011
Minister of Communications, Transport, Posts, and Construction	Sommad Pholsena	8 June 2006	15 June 2011
Minister in the Office of the Prime Minister	Cheuang Sombounkhanh	8 June 2006	15 June 2011
Minister in the Office of the Prime Minister	Bounpheng Mounphoxay	8 June 2006	15 June 2011
Minister in the Office of the Prime Minister	Onneua Phommachanh	8 June 2006	15 June 2011
Minister in the Office of the Prime Minister	Khamouane Boupha	8 June 2006	15 June 2011
Minister in the Office of the Prime Minister	Bountiem Phitsamay	8 June 2006	15 June 2011
Minister in the Office of the Prime Minister	Khamluad Sitlakon	8 June 2006	15 June 2011
Minister in the Office of the Prime Minister	Khempheng Pholsena	2008	15 June 2011
Minister in the Office of the Prime Minister	Bouasi Lorvansay	?	15 June 2011
Minister in the Office of the Prime Minister	Douangsavat Souphanouvong	?	15 June 2011
Minister in the Office of the Prime Minister	Phouthong Saengakhom	?	15 June 2011
Minister in the Office of the Prime Minister	Xaysengly Tengbriachue	?	15 June 2011

== Committees and others ==
Ministry	Minister	Took office	Left office
Head of the Government Secretariat Committee	Cheuang Sombounkhanh	8 June 2006	15 June 2011
President of the National Tourism Authority	Somphong Mongkhonvilay	8 June 2006	15 June 2011
President of the Public Administration and Public Service Authority	Bounpheng Mounphoxay	8 June 2006	15 June 2011
Minister and Head of the Science, Technology, and Environment Agency	Bountiem Phitsamay	8 June 2006	15 June 2011
Head of the Water Resources and Environment Agency	Khempheng Pholsena	2008	15 June 2011
President of the National Mekong River Committee	Khamluad Sitlakon	8 June 2006	15 June 2011
Head of the Office of the President	Soubanh Srithirath	8 June 2006	15 June 2011
President of the Planning and Investment Committee	Soulivong Daravong	8 June 2006	15 June 2011
President of the State Control and Inspection	Asang Laoli	8 June 2006	15 June 2011
Governor of the Bank of the Lao P.D.R.	Phouphet Khamphounvong	8 June 2006	15 June 2011
