= 2nd Central Committee of the Lao People's Revolutionary Party =

The 2nd Central Committee of the Lao People's Revolutionary Party (2nd CC LPRP) was elected by the 2nd National Congress on 6 February 1972, and remained in session until the election of the 3rd Central Committee on 27 April 1982. In between convocations of the party congresses the Central Committee is the highest decision-making institution in the party. The 2nd Central Committee was not a permanent institution and delegated day-to-day work to elected central guidance bodies, such as the Politburo and the Secretariat. It convened meetings, known as "Plenary Session of the 2nd Central Committee", to discuss major policies. The 2nd CC was composed of 23 members and 6 alternates, and at its 1st Plenary Session on 6 February 1972 it elected a seven-man 2nd Politburo, a four-man 2nd Secretariat and elected Kaysone Phomvihane to the office General Secretary of the Central Committee. As well as electing the party's central bodies, the 2nd National Congress formulated the general party line of the 2nd CC. The line reaffirmed the party's commitment to the theories of national people's democratic revolution in Laos and of constructing socialism by bypassing capitalism.

== Members ==
Rank	Name	Akson Lao	1st CC	3rd CC	Gender
1	Kaysone Phomvihane	ໄກສອນ ພົມວິຫານ	Old	Reelected	Male
2	Nouhak Phoumsavanh	ໜູຮັກ ພູມສະຫວັນ	Old	Reelected	Male
3	Souphanouvong	ສຸພານຸວົງ	Old	Reelected	Male
4	Phoumi Vongvichit	ພູມີ ວົງວິຈິດ	Old	Reelected	Male
5	Khamtai Siphandon	ຄໍາໄຕ ສີພັນດອນ	Old	Reelected	Male
6	Phoun Sipaseuth	ພູນ ສີປະເສີດ	Old	Reelected	Male
7	Sisomphon Lovansay	ສີສົມພອນ ລໍວັນໄຊ	Old	Reelected	Male
8	Sali Vongkhamsao	ສາລີ ວົງຄໍາຊາວ	Old	Reelected	Male
9	Sisavath Keobounphanh	ສີສະຫວາດ ແກ້ວບຸນພັນ	Old	Reelected	Male
10	Samane Vignaket	ສະໝານ ວິຍະເກດ	New	Reelected	Male
11	Maichantan Sengmani	ໄມຈັນຕານ ແສງມະນີ	New	Reelected	Male
12	Maisouk Saisompheng	ໄມສຸກ ໄຊສົມແພງ	New	Reelected	Male
13	Chanmi Douangboutdi	ຈັນມີ ດວງບຸດດີ	New	Reelected	Male
14	Thit Mouan Saochanthala	ທິດມ່ວນ ສາວຈັນທະລາ	Old	Reelected	Male
15	Meun Somvichit	ໝື່ນ ສົນວິຈິດ	Old	Reelected	Male
16	Souk Vongsak	ເຈົ້າສຸກ ວົງສັກ	New	Reelected	Male
17	Ma Khaikhamphithoun	ມາ ໄຂຄຳພິທູນ	New	Reelected	Male
18	Somseun Khampithoun	ຊົມຊື່ນ ຄຳພິທູນ	Old	Died	Male
19	Khamsouk Saignaseng	ຄຳສຸກ ໄຊຍະແສງ	Old	Reelected	Male
20	Boualang Boualapha	ບົວລາງ ບົວລະພາ	New	Reelected	Male
21	Sounthon Thepasa	ສູນທອນ ເທບອາສາ	New	Reelected	Male
22	Sanan Soutthichak	ສະນັ່ນ ສຸດທິຈັກ	Old	Reelected	Male
23	Khampheng Boupha	ຄຳແພງ ບຸບຜາ	New	Reelected	Female

== Alternates ==
Rank	Name	Akson Lao	3rd CC	Gender
1	Khambou Sounisai	ຄຳບູ່ ສຸນີໄຊ	Reelected	Male
2	Nhiavu Lobliayao	ເຍຍວື ລໍເບຼຍຢາວ	Reelected	Male
3	Siphon Phalikhan	ສີພອນ ຜາລີຂັນ	Reelected	Male
4	Somsak Saisongkham	ສົມສັກ ໄຊສົງຄາມ	Reelected	Male
5	Sisana Sisane	ສີສະນະ ສີສານ	Reelected	Male
6	Khamphay Boupha	ຄຳເພັງ ບຸບຜາ	Reelected	Male

== Bibliography ==
- Brown, MacAlister; Zasloff, Joseph J. (1986). Apprentice Revolutionaries: The Communist Movement in Laos, 1930–1985. Hoover Institution Press. ISBN 0-8179-8122-5.
- Stuart Fox, Martin (2007). "Laos: Politics in a Single-party state". Southeast Asian Affairs. 2007 (1). Institute of Southeast Asian Studies: 161–180. JSTOR 27913331. S2CID 154538190.
- Suh, Dae-sook (1981). Korean Communism 1945–1980: A Reference Guide to the Political System (1st ed.). University Press of Hawaii. ISBN 0-8248-0740-5.
- Thayer, Carlyle (1983). "Laos in 1982: The Third Congress of the Lao People's Revolutionary Party". Asian Survey. 23 (1). University of California Press: 84–93. doi:10.2307/2644329. JSTOR 27913331.
- Yamada, Norihiko (2002). "第6章 ラオス人民革命党第7回大会—残された課題" [Chapter 6: The 7th National Congress of the Lao People's Revolutionary Party 7th and Challenges Ahead]. Vietnam and Laos After the 2001 National Congresses: Challenges Ahead (46). Institute of Developing Economies of the Ministry of Economy, Trade and Industry: 121–151. hdl:2344/00009403.
