= General Secretary of the Lao People's Revolutionary Party =

Highest-ranking member of the Lao People's Revolutionary Party

General Secretary of the Central Committee of the Lao People's Revolutionary Party
- Emblem of the Lao People's Revolutionary Party

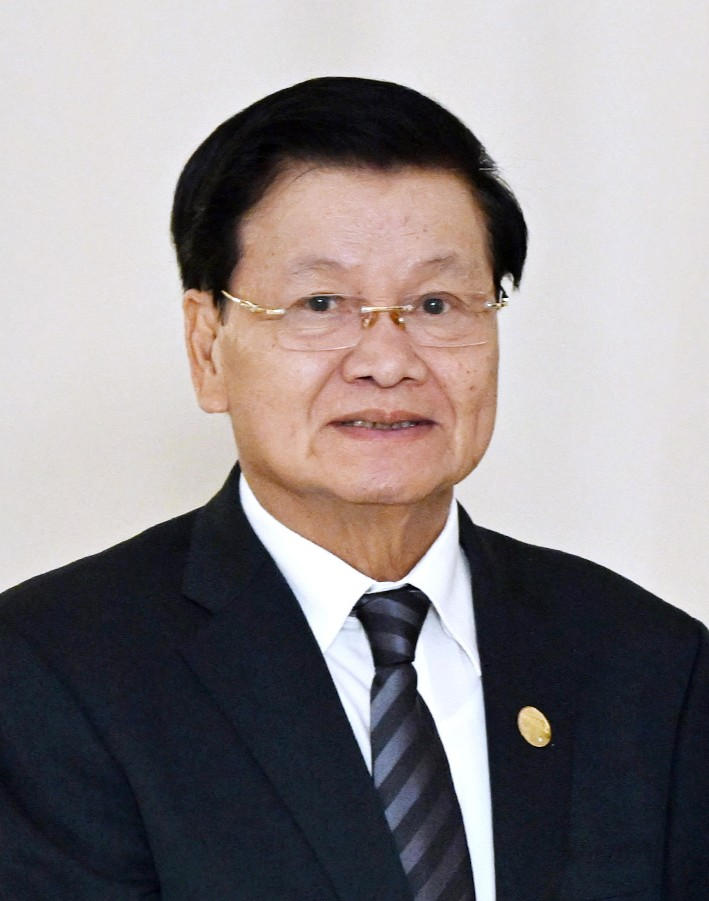
- Incumbent; Thongloun Sisoulith since 15 January 2021
- Lao People's Revolutionary Party
- Style: Comrade (Formal)
- Type: Party leader Top leader of Laos
- Appointer: Central Committee
- Term length: Five years, renewable
- Formation: 22 March 1955
- First holder: Kaysone Phomvihane

The General Secretary of the Central Committee of the Lao People's Revolutionary Party is the highest-ranking member of the Lao People's Revolutionary Party (LPRP).

== Officeholders ==
Portrait	Name (Birth–Death)	Term of office			Central Committee(s)
Portrait	Name (Birth–Death)	Took office	Left office	Time in office	Central Committee(s)
General Secretary
	Kaysone Phomvihane (1920–1992)	22 March 1955	29 March 1991	36 years, 7 days	I–II–III–IV (1955–1991)
Chairman
	Kaysone Phomvihane (1920–1992)	29 March 1991	21 November 1992	1 year, 237 days	V (1991–1996)
	Khamtai Siphandone (1924–2025)	24 November 1992	21 March 2006	13 years, 117 days	V–VI–VII (1991–2006)
General Secretary
	Choummaly Sayasone (born 1936)	21 March 2006	22 January 2016	9 years, 307 days	VIII–IX (2006–2016)
	Bounnhang Vorachit (born 1937)	22 January 2016	15 January 2021	4 years, 359 days	X (2016–2021)
	Thongloun Sisoulith (born 1945)	15 January 2021	Incumbent	5 years, 235 days	XI–XII (2021–2031)
