= 6th National Congress of the Lao People's Revolutionary Party =

- Date: 18–20 March 1996 (3 days)
- Participants: 381 (which includes the members of the 5th Central Committee)
- Outcome: The election of the 6th Central Committee on 20 March 1996

The 6th National Congress of the Lao People's Revolutionary Party was held in Vientiane from 18 to 20 March 1996. The congress occurs once every five years. A total of 381 delegates represented the party's 78,000 card-carrying members.

== Central Committee composition ==
The 6th Congress saw the weakening of the authority of those people who supported faster and more radical economic reforms. Leading officials who was not elected to the Central Committee were Khamphoui Keoboualapha, the Chairman of the Committee for Planning and Cooperation, Minister of Finance Khamsai Souphanouvong and Phao Bounnaphon, the Minister of Communications. Of the 49 members elected to the 6th Central Committee, 76 percent of them had joined the party before 1975, when the party seized power and the Lao People's Democratic Republic was established. Only three members of the Central Committee had been members of the Indochinese Communist Party, and less than 10 percent of the Central Committee members had not partaken in the revolutionary struggle to seize power in 1975. In total, over 84 percent of the members are older than 45 years of age, and were therefore believed to be less willing to abandon key socialist ideals and one-party rule. Four women were elected to the 6th Central Committee. 15 new members were elected to the 6th Central Committee, the majority of these people had a background in provincial politics. The 6th Congress saw the militarization of the party by the appointment of several figures from the Lao People's Army such as Osakanh Thammatheva and Asang Laoly (both were elected to the 6th Politburo). In regards to education, just over half had scientific or technical qualifications, the remaining others probably graduated in Marxism–Leninism.

== Economic policies ==
Despite the fact that the majority of the most radical reformers lost their seats in both the Politburo and the Central Committee, the 6th Congress reaffirmed the party's commitment to socialism and the New Economic Mechanism, the name of the Laotian economic reform program. Khamtai Siphandon, the party's General Secretary, said in his closing speech that the economy would target a growth rate of 8–8,5 percent in the period 1996–2000 and that GPD per capita income would increase from 360 American dollars to 500 by 2000. How this was to be achieved was made rather vague, but congress documents mentioned the role of the primary sector, macroeconomic stability, and direct investment made by foreign companies and Laotians living overseas.

== Foreign policy ==
The 6th Congress reaffirmed Laos' commitment to its special relationship with the Vietnam, and to a lesser extent, to China – two of the remaining socialist states. These special relationship were reaffirmed in the light by their shared ideological views. Khamtai maintained the importance of foreign relations with the Non-Aligned Movement and with countries that were willing to give Laos economic aid.

== Immediate aftermath ==
At the 1st plenum of the 6th Central Committee, the Central Committee elected the 6th Politburo, the highest decision-making body of the party and state. Of the nine members elected to the 6th Politburo, seven of them had a military background. Of these seven, six are generals and one is a colonel in the Lao People's Army. While it may be said that their duties were when mostly political and administrative, all of them retained their military ranks and influence within the military establishment. Khamtai Siphandon, the 1st-ranked member is a general and was the former commander-in-chief, while 2nd-ranked Saman Vinayket is a Lieutenant General and was the Chairman of the National Assembly. Udom Khattinya and Thongsing Thammavong, the 4th and 5th-ranked members respectively, were the only Politburo members with a civilian background. 5th Politburo members who were not elected to the 6th Politburo were Kaison Phomvihan, Phun Siipasoet, Somlat Chanthamat (all three died), Nouhak Phumsavan, Maichantan Saengmani (both retired due to old age) and Khamphuy Kaeobualapha (who was demoted).

== Bibliography ==
- Bourdet, Yves (January 1997). "Laos in 1996: Please Don't Rush!". Asian Survey. 37 (1). University of California Press: 72–78. doi:10.2307/2645776. JSTOR 2645776.
- Stuart-Fox, Martin (1998). "After the Sixth Party Congress" (PDF). Department of History of the University of Queensland.
