= 3rd Government of Laos =

The Third Government of the Lao People's Democratic Republic was established on 25 February 1993.

== Ministries ==
| Ministry | Minister | Took office | Left office |
|---|---|---|---|
| Prime Minister | Khamtai Siphandon | 25 February 1993 | 16 February 1998 |
| Deputy Prime Minister | Khamphoui Keoboualapha | 25 February 1993 | 16 February 1998 |
| Deputy Prime Minister | Boungnang Volachit | 25 February 1993 | 16 February 1998 |
| Deputy Prime Minister and Standing Member of the Government | Somsavat Lengsavad | 25 February 1993 | 16 February 1998 |
| Minister of Agriculture and Forestry | Sian Saphangthong (acting) | ? | ? |
| Minister of Communications, Transport, Posts and Construction | Phao Bounnaphonh | 25 February 1993 | 16 February 1998 |
| Ministry of Education, Sports and Fine Arts | Phimmasone Leuangkhamma | 25 February 1993 | 16 February 1998 |
| Minister of Finance | Saysomphone Phomvihane | 25 February 1993 | 16 February 1998 |
| Minister of Foreign Affairs | Somsavat Lengsavat | 25 February 1993 | 16 February 1998 |
| Minister of Industry and Handicrafts | Soulivong Daravong | 25 February 1993 | 16 February 1998 |
| Minister of Information and Culture | Osakan Thammatheva | 25 February 1993 | 16 February 1998 |
| Minister of Interior | Asang Laoli | 25 February 1993 | 16 February 1998 |
| Minister of Justice | Khamouane Boupha | 25 February 1993 | 16 February 1998 |
| Minister of Labor and Social Welfare | Thongloun Sisoulith | 25 February 1993 | 16 February 1998 |
| Minister of National Defense | Choummaly Sayasone | 25 February 1993 | 16 February 1998 |
| Minister in the Office of the Prime Minister | Khamsai Souphanouvong | 25 February 1993 | 16 February 1998 |
| Minister of Public Health | Pommek Dakakoi | 25 February 1993 | 16 February 1998 |
| Minister of Trade | Sompadit Volasan | 25 February 1993 | 16 February 1998 |
