= 2nd Politburo of the Lao People's Revolutionary Party =

Meeting of the 2nd Politburo circa 1972.

The 2nd Politburo of the Lao People's Revolutionary Party (LPRP), officially the Political Bureau of the 2nd Central Committee of the Lao People's Revolutionary Party, was elected in 1972 by the 1st Plenary Session of the 2nd Central Committee, in the immediate aftermath of the 2nd National Congress.

The 2nd Politburo witnessed dramatic debates on the topic of the transition to socialism, planned economic activity verus market relations and how to construct a people's democratic dictatorship. The Politburo was divideded between reformers such as Kaysone Phomvihane, who were influenced by economic reforms in China and Vietnam, and the followers of Nouhak Phoumsavan that wanted to strengthen state-control and supported a traditional planned economy based on the Soviet model.

== Members ==
Rank	Name	Akson Lao	3rd POL	Birth	Death	Gender
1	Kaysone Phomvihane	ໄກສອນ ພົມວິຫານ	Reelected	1920	1992	Male
2	Nouhak Phoumsavan	ໜູຮັກ ພູມສະຫວັນ	Reelected	1910	2008	Male
3	Souphanouvong	ສຸພານຸວົງ	Reelected	1909	1995	Male
4	Phoumi Vongvichit	ພູມີ ວົງວິຈິດ	Reelected	1909	1994	Male
5	Khamtai Siphandone	ຄໍາໄຕ ສີພັນດອນ	Reelected	1924	2025	Male
6	Phoun Sipaseut	ພູນ ສີປະເສີດ	Reelected	1920	1994	Male
7	Sisomphon Lovansay	ສີສົມພອນ ລໍວັນໄຊ	Reelected	1916	1993	Male
