= National Congress of the Lao People's Revolutionary Party =

The National Congress of the Lao People's Revolutionary Party (LPRP; Lao: ກອງປະຊຸມໃຫຍ່ຂອງ ພັກປະຊາຊົນປະຕິວັດລາວ) is the party's highest decision-making body. The LPRP has convened 11 congresses since its foundation in 1955, and eight since taking power in 1975. According to the party rules, the party congress is to be convened by the LPRP Central Committee (CC) every fifth year. It functions as a forum that approves party policy (such as the five-year plans), is empowered to amend the party's charter and program, and elects the Central Committee. The party leadership, through the Political Report of the Central Committee, briefs the party on its work in the period since its last congress, and sets out future goals for the period in between the next congress.

The congress was always convened in March from the 5th Congress in 1991 to the 9th Congress in 2011. According to Martin Sturt-Fox, this suggests an ideological cohesion within the party and its leadership. The 4th Congress introduced the "New Economic Mechanism" (NEM, market reforms). Partly for introducing NEM, the 4th Congress is the last congress to be postponed due to political infighting. Due to the party's secret nature, it's hard to discern the work and the political intrigues which takes place before the congress. In the run-up to party congresses, outside observers try to discern factional intrigues, usually between two supposedly "pro-Chinese" and "pro-Vietnamese" or "pro-reform" and "anti-reform" camps. Despite this, there seems to be broad agreement within the party on the path its pursuing: that is, creating a socialist market economic model and attracting foreign direct investment.

== Keys ==
Abbreviations
CC	Central Committee of the Lao People's Revolutionary Party
FM	Full member (a member with voting rights).
AM	Alternate member (a member without voting rights).
Political Report	Political Report to the Central Committee, a document which briefs delegates about the period since the last Congress and future work.
PMR	Party members represented at the congress by delegates (the party membership at the time).

== Convocations ==
Congress	Duration (start—end)	Delegates	CC elected	Political Report (presented by)	PMR
1st National Congress; 17 day None	22 March – 14 April 1955	25	5	None	~400
2nd National Congress; 4 days 1972 election	3 February – 6 February 1972	125	21 FM – 6 AM	Kaysone Phomvihane	21,000
3rd National Congress; 4 days 1981–1982 election	27 April – 30 April 1982	228	49 FM – 6 AM	Kaysone Phomvihane	35,000
4th National Congress; 3 days 1985–1986 election	13 November – 15 November 1986	300	51 FM – 9 AM	Kaysone Phomvihane	40,000
5th National Congress; 3 days 1990–1991 election	27 March – 29 March 1991	367	55 FM – 44 AM	Kaysone Phomvihane	60,000
6th National Congress; 3 days 1995–1996 election	18 March – 20 March 1996	381	49	Khamtai Siphandon	78,000
7th National Congress; 3 days 2000–2001 election	12 March – 14 March 2001	452	53	Khamtai Siphandon	100,000
8th National Congress; 4 days 2005–2006 election	18 March – 21 March 2006	498	55	Khamtai Siphandon	148,590
9th National Congress; 5 days 2010–2011 election	17 March – 21 March 2011	576	61	Choummaly Sayasone	191,700
10th National Congress; 5 days 2015–2016 election	18 January – 22 January 2016	685	69 – 8 AM	Choummaly Sayasone	252,879
11th National Congress; 3 days 2020–2021 election	13 January – 15 January 2021	768	71 – 10 AM	Bounnhang Vorachit	348,686
12th National Congress; 3 days 2025–2026 election	6 January – 8 January 2026	768	73 – 15 AM	Thongloun Sisoulith	421,865

== See also ==
- Socialist market economy
- Socialist-oriented market economy
