= Vice President of Laos =

Political position in Laos

Vice President of the Lao People's Democratic Republic
- ຮອງປະທານປະເທດລາວ
- National Emblem

- National Flag

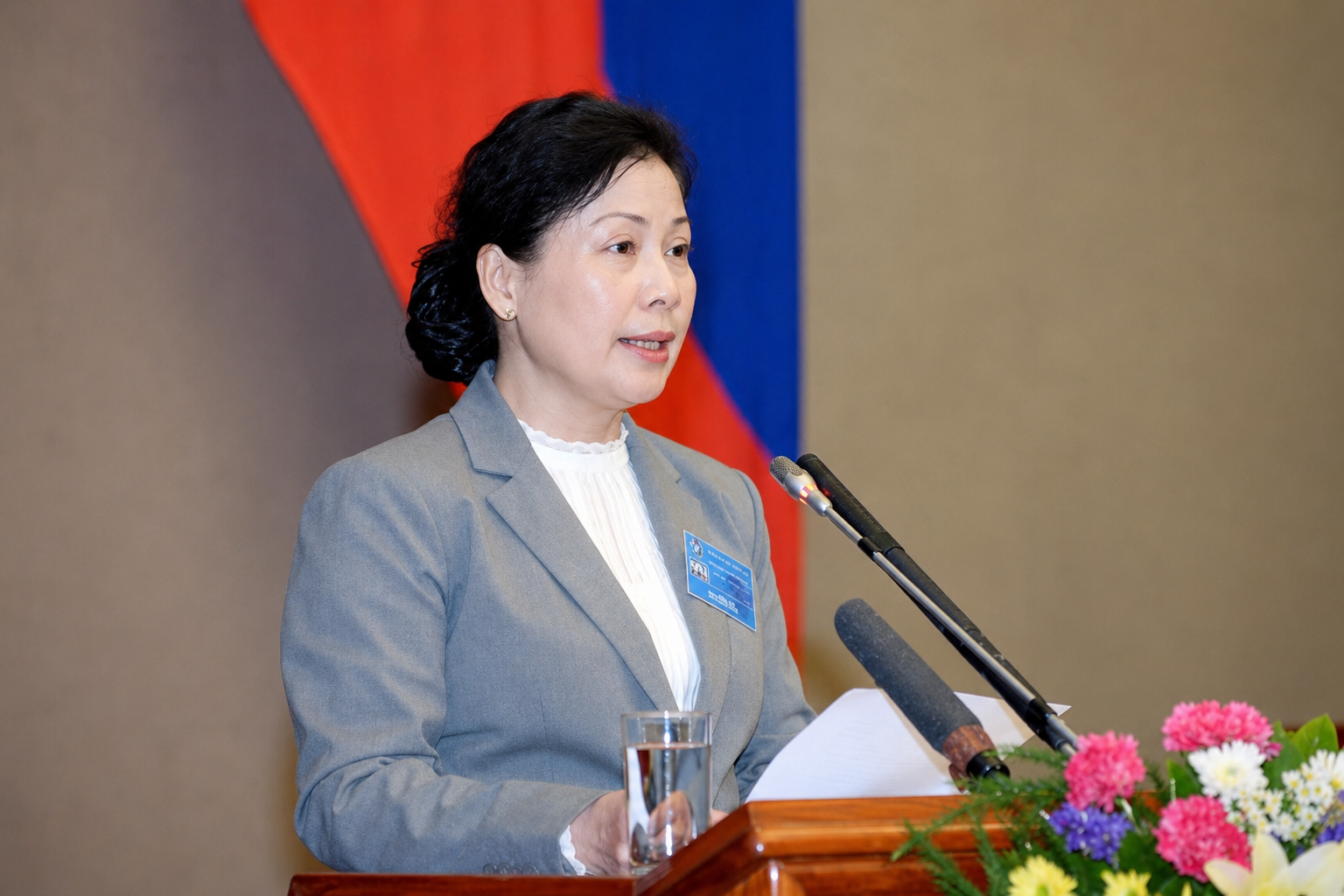
- Incumbent; Viengthong Siphandone since 23 March 2026
- Executive branch; Office of the Vice President
- Style: His/Her Excellency
- Status: Second highest in executive branch
- Member of: LPRP Central Committee; LPRP Politburo; LPRP Secretariat; LPRP Defence Commission
- Seat: Vientiane
- Nominator: President
- Appointer: National Assembly (Laos)
- Term length: Five years, renewable once
- Formation: 24 February 1998 (28 years ago)
- First holder: Sisavath Keobounphanh

The vice president of Laos is the political position in Laos created in 1996. The vice president is elected by the National Assembly of Laos.

== List of vice presidents ==
The history of the office holders follows.

No.	Portrait	Name (Birth–Death)	Term of office			Political party	President(s)
No.	Portrait	Name (Birth–Death)	Took office	Left office	Time in office	Political party	President(s)
1		Sisavath Keobounphanh ສີສະຫວາດ ແກ້ວບຸນພັນ (1928–2020)	1996	1998	2 years	Lao People's Revolutionary Party	Nouhak Phoumsavanh
2		Oudom Khattigna ອຸດົມ ຂັດຕິຍະ (1931–1999)	24 February 1998	9 December 1999	1 year, 288 days	Lao People's Revolutionary Party	Khamtai Siphandone
Position vacant (9 December 1999 – 27 March 2001)							Khamtai Siphandone
3		Choummaly Sayasone ຈູມມະລີ ໄຊຍະສອນ (born 1936)	27 March 2001	8 June 2006	5 years, 73 days	Lao People's Revolutionary Party	Khamtai Siphandone
4		Bounnhang Vorachit ບຸນຍັງ ວໍລະຈິດ (born 1937)	8 June 2006	20 April 2016	9 years, 317 days	Lao People's Revolutionary Party	Choummaly Sayasone
5		Phankham Viphavanh ພັນຄຳ ວິພາວັນ (born 1951)	20 April 2016	22 March 2021	4 years, 336 days	Lao People's Revolutionary Party	Bounnhang Vorachith
6		Pany Yathotou ປານີ ຢາທໍ່ຕູ້ (born 1951)	22 March 2021	23 March 2026	5 years, 1 day	Lao People's Revolutionary Party	Thongloun Sisoulith
6		Bounthong Chitmany ບຸນທອງ ຈິດມະນີ (born 1948)	22 March 2021	23 March 2026	5 years, 1 day	Lao People's Revolutionary Party	Thongloun Sisoulith
7		Viengthong Siphandone ວຽງທອງ ສີພັນດອນ (born ?)	23 March 2026	Incumbent	216 days	Lao People's Revolutionary Party	Thongloun Sisoulith

== See also ==
- President of Laos
- List of current vice presidents
