= Maichantan Sengmani =

Laotian politician

Head of the LPRP Central Committee Propaganda and Training Board

4th term
- In office 1986–1990
- General Secretary: Kaysone Phomvihane
- Succeeded by: Osakanh Thammatheva

3rd term
- In office 1982–1986
- General Secretary: Kaysone Phomvihane

2nd term
- In office 1980–1982
- General Secretary: Kaysone Phomvihane
- Preceded by: Chanmi Douangboutdi

Head of the LPRP Central Committee Organisation Commission

4th term
- In office 1989–1990
- General Secretary: Kaysone Phomvihane
- Preceded by: Samane Vignaket
- Succeeded by: Oudom Khattigna

Personal details
- Born: 1920
- Died: 1991 (aged 70–71) Vientiane, Laos
- Party: Lao People's Revolutionary Party
- Occupation: Politician

Maichantan Sengmani (Lao: ໄມຈັນຕານ ແສງມະນີ; born 1922 – died 1991) was a Laotian politician and member of the Lao People's Revolutionary Party (LPRP). An ethnic Khmu, he served as the Chairman of the LPRP Control Commission and the State Control Commission.

He was elected to the LPRP Central Committee at the 2nd National Congress and still retained his seat until the 6th National Congress. At the 3rd National Congress he was elected to the LPRP Secretariat and at the 4th National Congress he was elected to the LPRP Politburo.
