= Vongsa =

Vongsa is a surname. Notable people with the surname include:

- Phandouangchit Vongsa (born 1942), Laotian politician
- Sourigna Vongsa (died 1694), Laotian royalty
