= 5th Central Committee =

5th Central Committee may refer to:

- Central Committee of the 5th Congress of the Russian Social Democratic Labour Party, 1907–1912
- 5th Central Committee of the Chinese Communist Party, 1927–1928
- 5th Central Committee of the Communist Party of Cuba, 1997–2011
- 5th Central Committee of the Lao People's Revolutionary Party, 1991–1996
- 5th Central Committee of the Communist Party of Vietnam, 1982–1986
- 5th Central Committee of the Workers' Party of Korea, 1970–1980
- Central Committee of the 5th Congress of the Communist Party of Yugoslavia, 1948–1952
