= Lao National Anthem =

National anthem of Laos

Phēng Sā̂t Lāo
English: Lao National Anthem
- ເພງຊາດລາວ
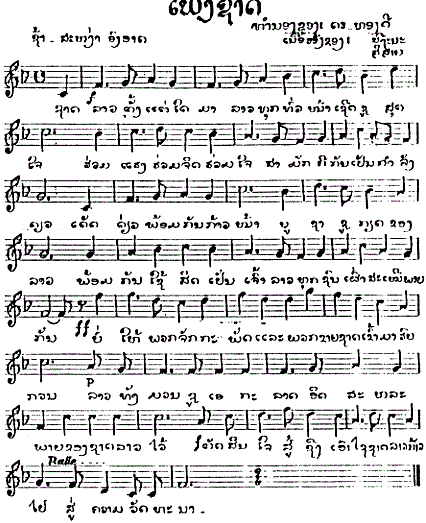
- National anthem of Laos
- Lyrics: Sisana Sisane, 1975
- Music: Thongdy Sounthonevichit, 1941
- Adopted: 1945

Audio sample
- U.S. Navy Band instrumental rendition: file; help

The Lao National Anthem (Note: Lao: ເພງຊາດລາວ, romanized: Phēng Sā̂t Lāo, pronounced [pʰēːŋ sâːt lāːw]) was first adopted as the national anthem of the Kingdom of Laos in 1945. It was written and composed in 1941 by Thongdy Sounthonevichit. After the Laotian Civil War and the establishment of the Lao People's Democratic Republic in 1975, the original lyrics were revised by Sisana Sisane, and these lyrics remain in use to this day.

== History ==
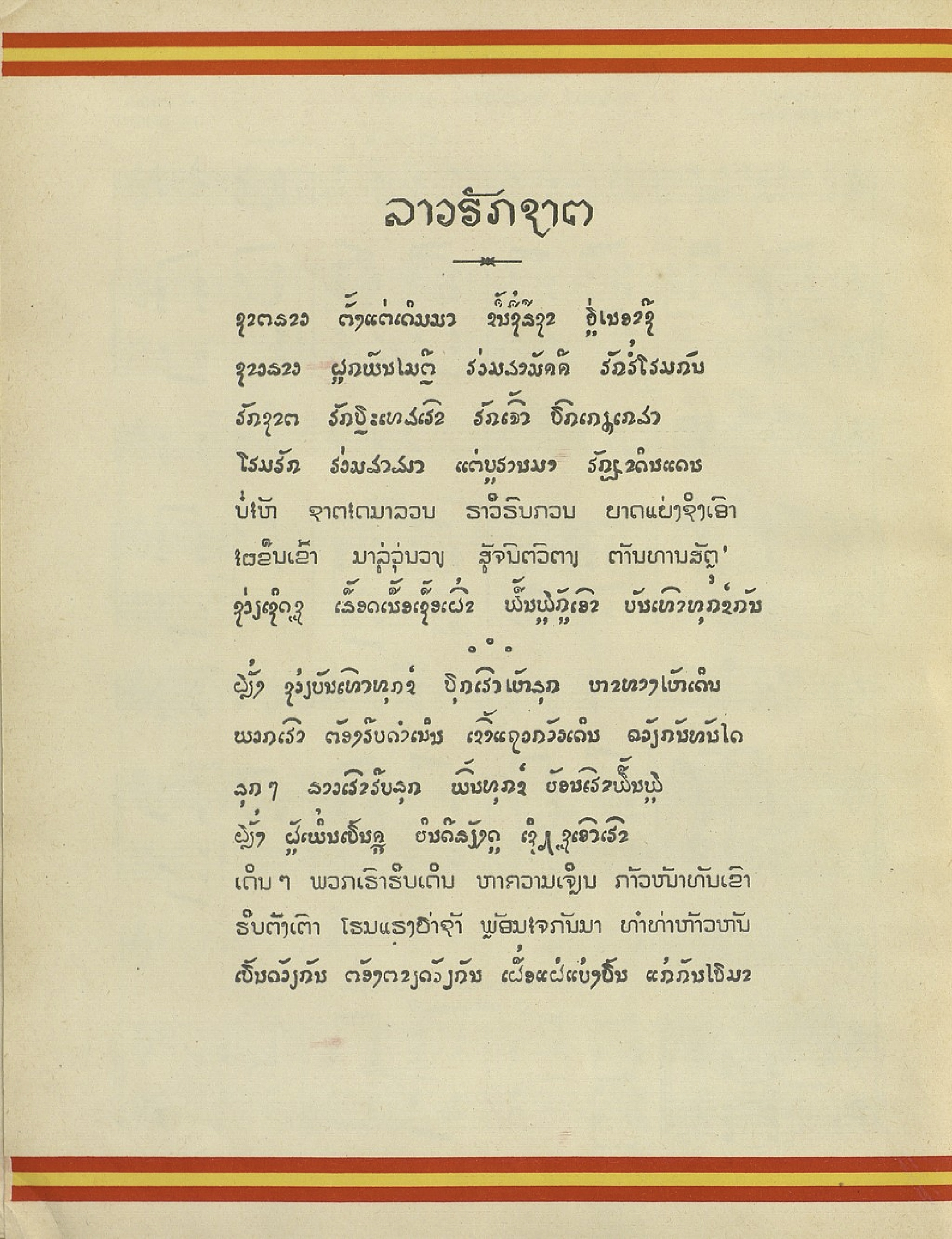
"Lāo Hák Sā̂t"(Lao: ລາວຮັກຊາຕ [lāːw hák̚ sâːt̚]; lit. 'The Lao Patriot'), the original lyrics of the national anthem. written by Maha Phoumi Chittaphong, published in Hymnes & pavillons dʼIndochine, December 1941.

In 1893 Laos became a protectorate of France within its colonial empire. The French claimed that their annexation was to protect Laos from "hostile neighbours" such as Qing China – and especially Siam, which had been militarily forced to cede Laos to the European colonial power. In reality, France simply ruled Laos as a colony, bringing in Vietnamese to work in its governing. The transferring of control from one master to another meant that nationalist sentiment did not develop as it did in formerly independent Vietnam. The outbreak of World War II saw the fall of France to Nazi Germany. The right-wing government in Siam saw this as a possible opportunity to regain formerly Thai territory lost to France, especially the land located on the Thai side of the Mekong River. To counteract this, the French colonial government began promoting the re-emergence of Lao nationalism.

Due to this liberalisation, some patriotic songs were composed, each one emphasising Lao "uniqueness". The Lao National Anthem was one of them, having been composed by Thongdy Sounthonevichit in 1941, with lyrics written by Maha Phoumi Chittaphong under the title "The Lao Patriot" (French: Le patriote Lao). It was chosen as the national anthem in 1945, when the king was forced by Japanese occupiers to declare Laos independent from French rule. France regained control of French Indochina after Japan's surrender in 1945. In 1947 France granted limited autonomy to Laos within the French Union, and the Lao National Anthem was officially adopted.

When the Pathet Lao emerged victorious in the Laotian Civil War in 1975, thanks to North Vietnamese assistance, the communist government abolished the monarchy and changed the lyrics to reflect the ideology of the Marxist government. As a result, the National Anthem became all-encompassing and egalitarian, mentioning all ethnic groups in Laos, instead of focusing on solely the Lao people and Buddhism. The melody was retained.

== Lyrics ==
=== Current official ===
==== Lao original ====
Lao script

ຊາດລາວຕັ້ງແຕ່ໃດມາ
ລາວທຸກທົ່ວໜ້າເຊີດຊູສຸດໃຈ

ຮ່ວມແຮງຮ່ວມຈິດຮ່ວມໃຈ
ສາມັກຄີກັນເປັນກຳລັງດຽວ

ເດັດດ່ຽວພ້ອມກັນກ້າວໜ້າ
ບູຊາຊູກຽດຂອງລາວ

ສົ່ງເສີມໃຊ້ສິດເປັນເຈົ້າ
ລາວທຸກຊົນເຜົ່າສະເໝີພາບກັນ

ບໍ່ໃຫ້ພວກຈັກກະພັດ
ແລະພວກຂາຍຊາດເຂົ້າມາລົບກວນ

ລາວທັງມວນຊູເອກະລາດ
ອິດສະຫຼະພາບຂອງຊາດລາວໄວ້

ຕັດສິນໃຈສູ້ຊີງເອົາໄຊ
ພາຊາດກ້າວ (Note: Some versions use ລາວ (lāo) instead of ກ້າວ (kā̂o).)ໄປສູ່ຄວາມວັດທະນາ

Latin script

Sā̂t Lāo tângtę̄̀ dàimā
Lāo thúk thûa nā̂ sơ̄t sū́ sútcai.

Hùam hę̄ng, hùam cít, hùam cai,
sāmákkhī kan pén kamlang diao.

Dét dìao phǭ̂mkan kā̂onā̂,
būsā sū́ kiat khǭ̀ng Lāo.

Sòngsơ̄m sái sít pén câo
Lāo thúk son phào sǎmơ̄; phāp kan.

Bǭ̀ hâi phúak cákkàphát
lę́ phúak khāi sā̂t khâo mā lópkhuan.

Lāo thang muan sū́ ḗkàlā́t,
ítsàlàphāp khǭ̀ng sā̂t Lāo wái

Tátsíncai sū̀ sīng ao sái
phā sā̂t kā̂o pái sū̀ khuam wátthànā.

IPA transcription (Note: See Help:IPA/Lao and Lao phonology.)

[sâːt̚ lāːw tâŋ.tɛ̀ː dàj.māː]
[lāːw tʰúk̚ tʰûːə nâː sɤ̄ːt̚ súː sút̚.tɕāj |]

[hùːəm hɛ̄ːŋ hùːəm tɕít̚ hùːəm tɕāj]
[sāː.mák̚.kʰīː kān pén kām.lāŋ dīːəw ‖]

[dét̚ dìːəw pʰɔ̂ːm.kān kâːw.nâː |]
[būː.sāː súː kīːət̚ kʰɔ̀ːŋ lāːw |]

[sòŋ.sɤ̄ːm sáj sít̚ pén tɕâw]
[lāːw tʰúk̚ sōn pʰàw sǎ.mɤ̄ː pʰāːp̚ kān ‖]

[bɔ̀ː hâj pʰúːək̚ tɕák̚.kà.pʰát̚]
[lɛ́ʔ pʰúːək̚ kʰāːj sâːt̚ kʰâw māː lóp̚.kʰūːən |]

[lāːw tʰāŋ mūːən súː ʔéːk̚.kà(ʔ̚).láːt̚]
[ʔít̚.sà.là.pʰāːp̚ kʰɔ̀ːŋ sâːt̚ lāːw wáj |]

[tát̚.sín.tɕāj sùː sīːŋ ʔāw sáj]
[pʰāː sâːt̚ kâːw páj sùː kʰūːəm wát̚.tʰà.nāː ‖]

==== English translation ====
For all time, the Lao folk
have glorified their motherland.

United in heart –
spirit and vigour as one.

Determined to move forward,
upholding the Laotians' grace.

Proclaiming their right to sovereignty,
equal are Laotians of every race.

No more shall imperialists
and traitors trample them.

Every Lao shall defend
the independence of Laos.

They'll battle for victory,
and lead the nation to prosperity.

=== Original lyrics (1947–1975) ===
==== Lao original ====
Lao script

ຊາຕລາວຕັ້ງແຕ່ເດີມມາ
ຂຶ້ນຊື່ລືຊາຢູ່ໃນອາຊີ

ຊາວລາວຜູກພັນໄມຕຣີ
ຮ່ວມສາມັຄຄີຮັກຫໍ່ໂຮມກັນ

ຮັກຊາຕຮັກປະເທສເຮົາ
ຮັກເຈົ້າປົກເກສເກສາ

ໂຮມຮັກຮ່ວມສາສນາ
ແຕ່ບູຮານມາຮັກສາດິນແດນ

ບໍ່ໃຫ້ຊາຕໃດມາລວນ
ຮາວີຮົບກວນຍາດແຍ່ງຊີງເອົາ

ໃຜຂືນເຂົ້າມາລູ່ວຸ່ນວາຍ
ສູ້ຈົນຕົວຕາຍຕ້ານທານສັຕຣູ

ຊ່ວຍເຊີດຊູເລືອດເນື້ອເຊື້ອເຜົ່າ
ຟື້ນຟູກູ້ເອົາບັຣເທົາທຸກຂ໌ກັນ

Latin script

Sā̂t Lāo tângtę̄̀ dơ̄mmā
Khư̂n sư̄̂ lư̄ sā yū̂nai āsī̂.

Sāo Lāo phū́kphan máitrī
Hùam sāmákkhī hák hǭ̀ ōmkan.

Háksā̂t hák pàthḗt hao
Hák câo pák kēt kēsā.

Hōm hák hùam sāsànā
Tę̄̀ būhān mā hák sā tindę̄n.

Bǭ̀ hâi sā̂t dai mā luān
Hā wī háp kuān nyā́t nyę̄̂ng sīng ao

Phai khưn khâo mā lū̂ wùnwāi
Sū̂ can tao tāi tā̂n sān sáttrū.

Sûai sơ̄t sū́ lứat nứa sứa phào
Phư̄̂n phū kū̂ ao bánthao thúk kan.

!IPA transcription

[sâːt̚ lāːw tâŋ.tɛ̀ː dɤ̄ːm.māː]
[kʰɯ̂n sɯ̂ː lɯ̄ː sāː jûː.nāj ʔāː.sîː |]

[sāːw lāːw pʰúːk̚.pʰān máj.tɾīː]
[hùːəm sāː.mák̚.kʰīː hák̚ hɔ̀ː hōːm kān ‖]

[hák̚.sâː̚t̚ hák̚ pà(ʔ̚).tʰéːt̚ hāw]
[hák̚ tɕâw pák̚ kēːt̚ kēː.sāː |]

[hōːm hák̚ hùːəm sāː.sà.nāː]
[tɛ̀ː būː.hāːn māː hák̚ sāː tīn.dɛ̄ːn ‖]

[bɔ̀ː hâj sâːt̚ dāj māː luāːn]
[hāː wīː háp̚ kuāːn ɲáːt̚ ɲɛ̂ːŋ sīːŋ ʔāw |]

[pʰāj kʰɯ̄n kʰâw māː lûː wùn.wāːj]
[sûː tɕān tāw tāːj tâːn tʰāːn sát̚.tɾūː |]

[sûːəj sɤ̄ːt̚ súː lɯ́ːət̚ nɯ̂ːə sɯ̂ːə pʰàw]
[pʰɯ̂ːn pʰūː kûː ʔāw bán.tʰāw tʰúk̚ kān ‖]

==== English translation ====
Once our Laotian race
in Asia highly honoured stood.

And at that time the folk
of Laos were united in love.

Today they love their race
and rally 'round their chiefs.

They guard the land and
the religion of their ancestors.

They will resist each foe
that may oppress them or invade.

And such invaders will
be met with battle unto death.

They'll restore the fame of Laos
and through ills united stand.
