= Lao Women's Union =

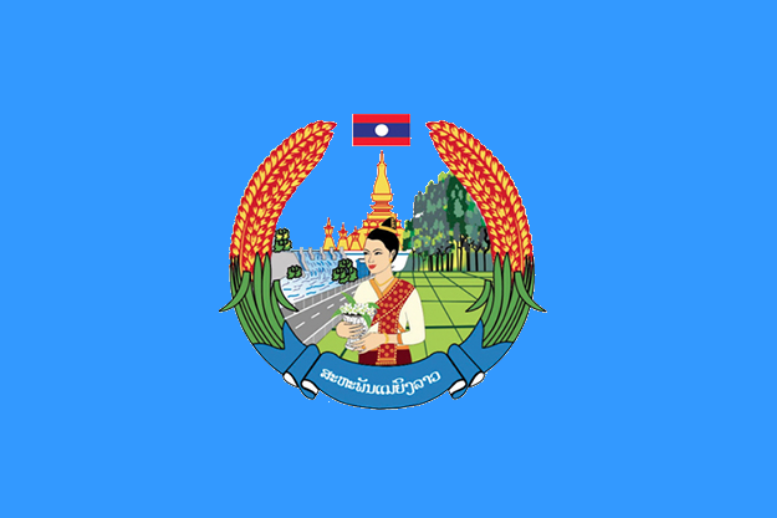
- Logo of the Lao Women's Union
- Abbreviation: LWU
- Formation: 20 July 1955
- Type: Mass organization
- Purpose: Women's rights
- Headquarters: Vientiane, Lao People's Democratic Republic
- Members: 958,717 (2011)
- President: Inlavanh Keobounphanh
- Vice President: Bouachanh Syhanath
- Main organ: National Congress and Executive Committee
- Affiliations: Women's International Democratic Federation
- Website: laowomenunion.org.la

The Lao Women's Union (LWU; Lao: ສະຫະພັນແມ່ຍິງລາວ) is a women's rights organization established in Laos on 20 July 1955. It was originally called the Lao Patriotic Women's Association, was renamed the Lao Women's Association in 1965 and got its present name at the 1st National Congress in 1984. It has acted as the official leader of the women's movement in Laos since its founding. It is responsible for promoting government policies on women, and protecting women's rights within the government, while liberating them from traditional norms within society and involving them in social revolution with the aim to promote their overall status and welfare in Laotian society.

Khampheng Boupha served as the first President of the Lao Women's Union. The current President Inlavanh Keobounphanh is the daughter of former Lao People's Revolutionary Party leader and former Laotian Prime Minister Sisavath Keobounphanh.

The post of President of the Lao Women's Union is minister-level and the officeholder therefore has the right to attend the meetings of the Government of Laos.

== Presidents ==
- Khampheng Boupha (1955–1988)
- Onchanh Thammavong (1988–2004)
- Sisay Leudetmounsone (2004–2020)
- Inlavanh Keobounphanh (2020–2023)
- Aly Vongnobountham (2023–present)

== National Congresses ==
- 1st National Congress (1984)
- 2nd National Congress (1988)
- 3rd National Congress (1993)
- 4th National Congress (2001)
- 5th National Congress (2006)
- 6th National Congress (2011)
- 7th National Congress (2015)
- 8th National Congress (2020)
