= Kikeo Khaykhamphithoune =

Laotian politician

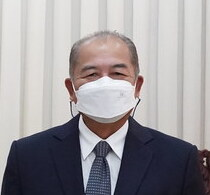
- Khaykhamphithoune in 2022

Head of the LPRP Central Committee Propaganda and Training Board
- In office 2014–2019
- General Secretary: Bounnhang Vorachith; Choummaly Sayasone
- Preceded by: Cheuang Sombounkhanh
- Succeeded by: Khamphanh Phommathat

Personal details
- Born: 11 August 1957 (age 69) Houaphan Province, Kingdom of Laos
- Party: Lao People's Revolutionary Party

Kikeo Khaykhamphithoune (Lao: ກິແກ້ວ ໄຂຄຳພິທູນ; born 11 August 1957) is a Laotian politician. He is a member of the Lao People's Revolutionary Party. He is a representative of the National Assembly of Laos for the city of Vientiane (Constituency 1). He has also served as Deputy Prime Minister.
