= Cheuang Sombounkhanh =

Laotian politician

Head of the LPRP Central Committee Propaganda and Training Board
- In office 2011–2014
- General Secretary: Choummaly Sayasone
- Preceded by: Phandouangchit Vongsa
- Succeeded by: Kikeo Khaykhamphithoune

Minister-Head of the Government Secretariat
- In office 8 July 2006 – 17 May 2014

Personal details
- Born: 5 March 1955 Kingdom of Laos
- Died: 17 May 2014 (aged 59) Baan Nadi, Lao People's Democratic Republic
- Party: Lao People's Revolutionary Party

Cheuang Sombounkhanh (Lao: ເຈືອງ ສົມບູນຂັນ; born 5 March 1955 – died 17 May 2014) was a Laotian politician. He was the governor of Bank of the Lao P.D.R. from 1997 to 1999.

From 2010 until his death, he had worked as a Minister to the Office of the Prime Minister. At the time of his death in a plane crash on 17 May 2014, he was a member of the Secretariat of the Central Committee of the Lao People's Revolutionary Party.
