= Soth Phetrasy =

Laotian politician

Minister for Economy & Planning

Personal details
- Born: 1915 Vientiane, Laos
- Died: 2004 (aged 88–89) Vientiane, Laos
- Party: Lao People's Revolutionary Party
- Spouse: Oudom Phetrasy

Soth Phetrasy (1915–2004) was a leading official of the Pathet Lao, the communist guerrilla movement of Laos associated with the Lao People's Party, during the 1960s and 1970s.

== Biography ==
Soth Phetrasy was born in 1915.

Phetrasy was an important figure to the Pathet Lao (Land of Lao) as he became spokesman for them in Vientiane from 1964. He became increasingly known as he tried to negotiate POW's between the United States and also matters such as Eugene DeBruin, and as diplomat of the Pathet Lao preparing the 1973 Vientiane Agreement.

Phetrasy was a minister in the third and final leftist and royalist coalition government of Laos from 1973 to 1975, serving as Minister for Economy and Planning under Souvanna Phouma. He was the managing director of Bank of the Lao P.D.R. from 1980 to 1983. He later became the ambassador of Laos to the Soviet Union.

Phetrasy died in Vientiane, Laos in 2004.

== See also ==
- Souvanna Phouma
