= Nhiavu Lobliayao =

Laotian politician

Nhiavu Lobliayao (RPA: Nyiaj Vws Lauj Npliaj Yob; 1915-1999) was a Laotian politician and member of the Lao People's Revolutionary Party (LPRP). He was born in Nonghet in 1915 to Kaitong Lo Bliayao and his second wife, May Yang, into an influential Hmong family. He was active in the communist movement since its inception, and was one of the founding members of the LPRP.

He was elected an alternate member of the LPRP Central Committee at the 2nd National Congress. At the 3rd National Congress he was elected a full member of the LPRP Central Committee and served in office until his retirement in 1990. He died in Nonghet on 16 June 1999 following a long-standing illness that had left him paralysed for the final year of his life.

His older brother was Faydang Lobliayao.
