= Propaganda and Training Board =

- Formation: 1951
- Type: Board reporting to the Central Committee
- Headquarters: Sivilai Village, Xaythani District
- Location: Vientiane, Laos
- Head: Khamphanh Pheuyavong
- Parent organization: Central Committee of the Lao People's Revolutionary Party
- Website: ptc.gov.la

The Propaganda and Training Board of the Lao People's Revolutionary Party's Central Committee (LPRP) was established in 1951 as an organ of the Indochinese Communist Party, and established in its current form in 1964. It is responsible for organising and leading the party's propaganda work.

The Head of the Central Committee Propaganda and Training Board (Lao: ຫົວໜ້າຄະນະໂຄສະນາອົບຮົມສູນກາງພັກ) is by right of office member of the LPRP Central Committee. The current head, Khamphanh Pheuyavong, is a member of the 11th Central Committee and the 11th Secretariat.

== Organisational structure ==
1. Administrative Office
2. Department on Organisation and Personnel
3. Department on Advertising
4. Department on Training
5. Department on General Affairs
6. Department Journal
7. Theoretical journal Alun Mai.

== Heads ==
No.	Name	Akson Lao	Took office	Left office	Gender	
1	Sanan Soutthichak	Akson Lao	ສະນັ່ນ ສຸດທິຈັກ	1964	1976	Male
2	Chanmi Douangboutdi	ຈັນມີ ດວງບຸດດີ	1976	1980	Male	
3	Maichantan Sengmani	ໄມຈັນຕານ ແສງມະນີ	1980	1990	Male	
4	Osakanh Thammatheva	ໂອສະກັນ ທໍາມະເທວາ	1990	31 October 2004	Male	
5	Mounkeo Oraboun	ໝູນແກ້ວ ອໍລະບູນ	November 2004	2005	Male	
6	Sileua Bounkham	ສີເຫຼືອ ບຸນຄ້ໍາ	2005	2006	Male	
7	Phandouangchit Vongsa	ພັນດວງຈິດ ວົງສາ	2006	2011	Male	
8	Cheuang Sombounkhanh	ເຈືອງ ສົມບູນຂັນ	2011	17 May 2014	Male	
9	Kikeo Khaykhamphithoune	ກິແກ້ວ ໄຂຄຳພິທູນ	May 2014	2019	Male	
10	Khamphanh Phommathat	ຄໍາພັນ ພົມມະທັດ	2019	4 February 2021	Male	
11	Khamphanh Pheuyavong	ຄໍາພັນ ເຜີຍຍະວົງ	4 February 2021	Incumbent	Male	
