= President of the National Assembly of Laos =

Presiding officer of the National Assembly of Laos

President of the National Assembly of the Lao People's Democratic Republic
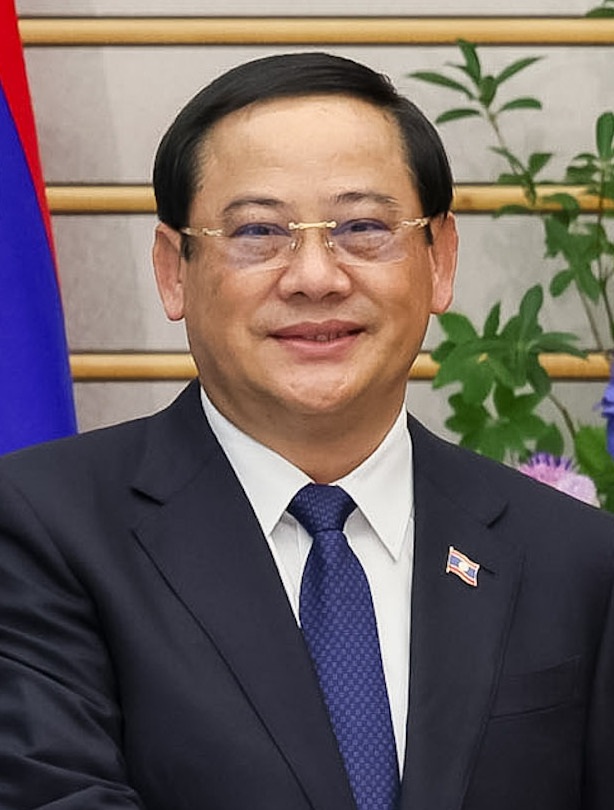
- Incumbent; Sonexay Siphandone since 5 October 2026
- National Assembly of Laos
- Type: Presiding officer
- Appointer: National Assembly of Laos
- Constituting instrument: Constitution of Laos

The President of the National Assembly of the Lao People's Democratic Republic is the speaker of the National Assembly of Laos. Before 1991, the President of the Standing Committee of the Supreme People's Assembly of the Lao People's Democratic Republic served as head of state and chairman of the presidium of the National Assembly's predecessor, the Supreme People's Assembly. The office was later merged with that of parliamentary speaker while the head of state became the President of Laos.

== List of presidents ==
=== Presidents of the Standing Committee of the Supreme People's Assembly ===
No.	Portrait	Name (Birth–Death)	Term of office			Political party	Notes
No.	Portrait	Name (Birth–Death)	Took office	Left office	Time in office	Political party	Notes
1		Souphanouvong ສຸພານຸວົງ (1909–1995)	2 December 1975	25 November 1986	10 years, 358 days	Lao People's Revolutionary Party	
–		Sisomphone Lovansay ສີສົມພອນ ລໍວັນໄຊ (1916–1993); Acting	25 November 1986	1988	1–2 years	Lao People's Revolutionary Party	
2		Nouhak Phoumsavanh ໜູຮັກ ພູມສະຫວັນ (1910–2008)	1 June 1989	25 November 1992	3 years, 177 days	Lao People's Revolutionary Party	

=== Presidents of the National Assembly ===
No.	Portrait	Name (Birth–Death)	Term of office			Party	Notes
No.	Portrait	Name (Birth–Death)	Took office	Left office	Time in office	Party	Notes
3		Samane Vignaket ສະໝານ ວິຍະເກດ (1927–2016)	25 February 1993	8 June 2006	13 years, 103 days years	Lao People's Revolutionary Party	
4		Thongsing Thammavong ທອງສິງ ທຳມະວົງ (born 1944)	8 June 2006	23 December 2010	4 years, 198 days	Lao People's Revolutionary Party	
5		Pany Yathotou ປານີ ຢາທໍ່ຕູ້ (born 1951)	23 December 2010	22 March 2021	10 years, 89 days	Lao People's Revolutionary Party	
6		Xaysomphone Phomvihane ໄຊສົມພອນ ພົມວິຫານ (1956–2026)	22 March 2021	8 August 2026 (died in office)	5 years, 139 days	Lao People's Revolutionary Party	
–		Sounthone Xayachack ສູນທອນ ໄຊຍະຈັກ (1959–); Acting	18 August 2026	5 October 202ໍ6	48 days	Lao People's Revolutionary Party	
7		Sonexay Siphandone ສອນໄຊ ສີພັນດອນ (1966–)	5 October 202ໍ6	Incumbent	0 days	Lao People's Revolutionary Party	

== See also ==
- Parliament of the Kingdom of Laos
