= Sisana Sisane =

Laotian politician (1922-1998)

Sisana Sisane (13 September 1922 – November 1998) was a Laotian politician and member of the Lao People's Revolutionary Party (LPRP).

He was born in Savannakhet. He became a substitute member of the LPRP Central Committee at the 2nd National Congress, and was elected to full membership at the 3rd National Congress and retained a seat on the body until. He also served as the Minister of Information of the Laotian Government.
