= Khamphoui Keoboualapha =

Laotian politician and member of the Lao People's Revolutionary Party

Minister of Finance
- In office 24 February 1998 – 6 August 1999
- Prime Minister: Khamtai Siphandon
- Prime Minister: Sisavath Keobounphanh
- Preceded by: Saysomphone Phomvihane
- Succeeded by: Bounnhang Vorachith

President of the Committee for Planning and Cooperation
- In office 15 August 1991 – 1996
- Prime Minister: Khamtai Siphandon
- Preceded by: Post established
- Succeeded by: Bouathong Vonglokham

Deputy Prime Minister of Laos
- In office 15 August 1991 – 6 August 1999 Serving with Bounnhang Vorachith
- Prime Minister: Kaysone Phomvihane

Ministry of Economics, Planning, and Finance
- In office 23 January – 15 August 1991
- Prime Minister: Khamtai Siphandon; Kaysone Phomvihane
- Preceded by: Sali Vongkhamxao
- Succeeded by: Khamsay Souphanouvong (as finance minister); Himself (as planning head)

Personal details
- Born: 1930 (age 95–96) Lao Ngam, Champasak Province, Laos
- Party: Lao People's Revolutionary Party
- Occupation: Politician

Khamphoui Keoboualapha (Lao: ຄໍາຜຸຍ ແກ້ວບົວລະພາ; born 13 June 1930) was a Laotian politician and member of the Lao People's Revolutionary Party.

He served as the First Secretary of the LPRP Champasak Provincial Committee in 1974–76, Minister of Economics, Planning and Finance in 1991 and served as a Deputy Prime Minister.

He was elected to the LPRP Central Committee at the 4th National Congress and retained a seat on the body until the 6th National Congress.
