= Pasaxon =

Newspaper in Laos

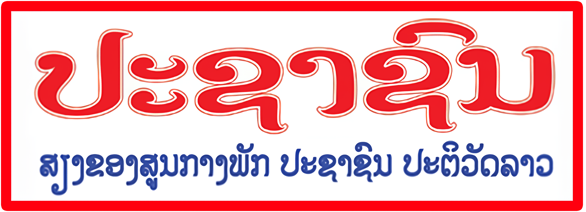
- Type: Weekly newspaper
- Format: Print, online
- Owner: Lao People's Revolutionary Party
- Founded: 13 August 1950
- Political alignment: Communism; Marxism–Leninism; Kaysone Phomvihane Thought
- Language: Lao
- Headquarters: Vientiane
- Website: http://www.pasaxon.org.la

Pasaxon (Lao: ປະຊາຊົນ, lit. 'the People') is a weekly newspaper published in Laos. The newspaper was established on 13 August 1950. It is the official organ of the Lao People's Revolutionary Party, a communist party based on the principles of Marxism-Leninism and the only political party authorized in the country.

== See also ==
- List of newspapers in Laos
