= Mounkeo Oraboun =

Laotian politician

Head of the LPRP Central Committee Propaganda and Training Board
- In office 2004–2005
- General Secretary: Khamtai Siphandone
- Preceded by: Osakanh Thammatheva
- Succeeded by: Sileua Bounkham

Personal details
- Born: 4 May 1942 (age 83) Vientiane Province, French protectorate of Laos
- Party: Lao People's Revolutionary Party
- Occupation: Politician

Mounkeo Oraboun (Lao: ໝູນແກ້ວ ອໍລະບູນ; born 4 May 1942) is a Laotian politician. As of 2010, he is the current Minister of Information and Culture in Laos. He attends many important events in the country and southeast Asia and is an active member of ASEAN, chairing the 10th conference in Vientiane in November 2009. As the Minister of Culture, Oraboun busily attends a diversity of events and inaugurations across Laos, ranging from attending newspaper anniversaries, to hotel openings.
