= Phandouangchit Vongsa =

Laotian politician

Head of the LPRP Central Committee Propaganda and Training Board
- In office 2006–2011
- General Secretary: Choummaly Sayasone
- Preceded by: Sileua Bounkham
- Succeeded by: Cheuang Sombounkhanh

Personal details
- Born: 12 December 1947 (age 78) Ban Sopsan, Xieng Kho district, Houaphan Province, Kingdom of Laos
- Party: Lao People's Revolutionary Party
- Occupation: Politician

Phandouangchit Vongsa (Lao: ພັນດວງຈິດ ວົງສາ; born 12 December 1942) is a Laotian politician, a member of the Lao People's Revolutionary Party, and a representative of the National Assembly of Laos for Oudomxay Province (Constituency 4).
