= Bank of the Lao P.D.R. =

Central Bank of Laos

Bank of the Lao P.D.R. ທະນາຄານ ແຫ່ງ ສ. ປ. ປ. ລາວ

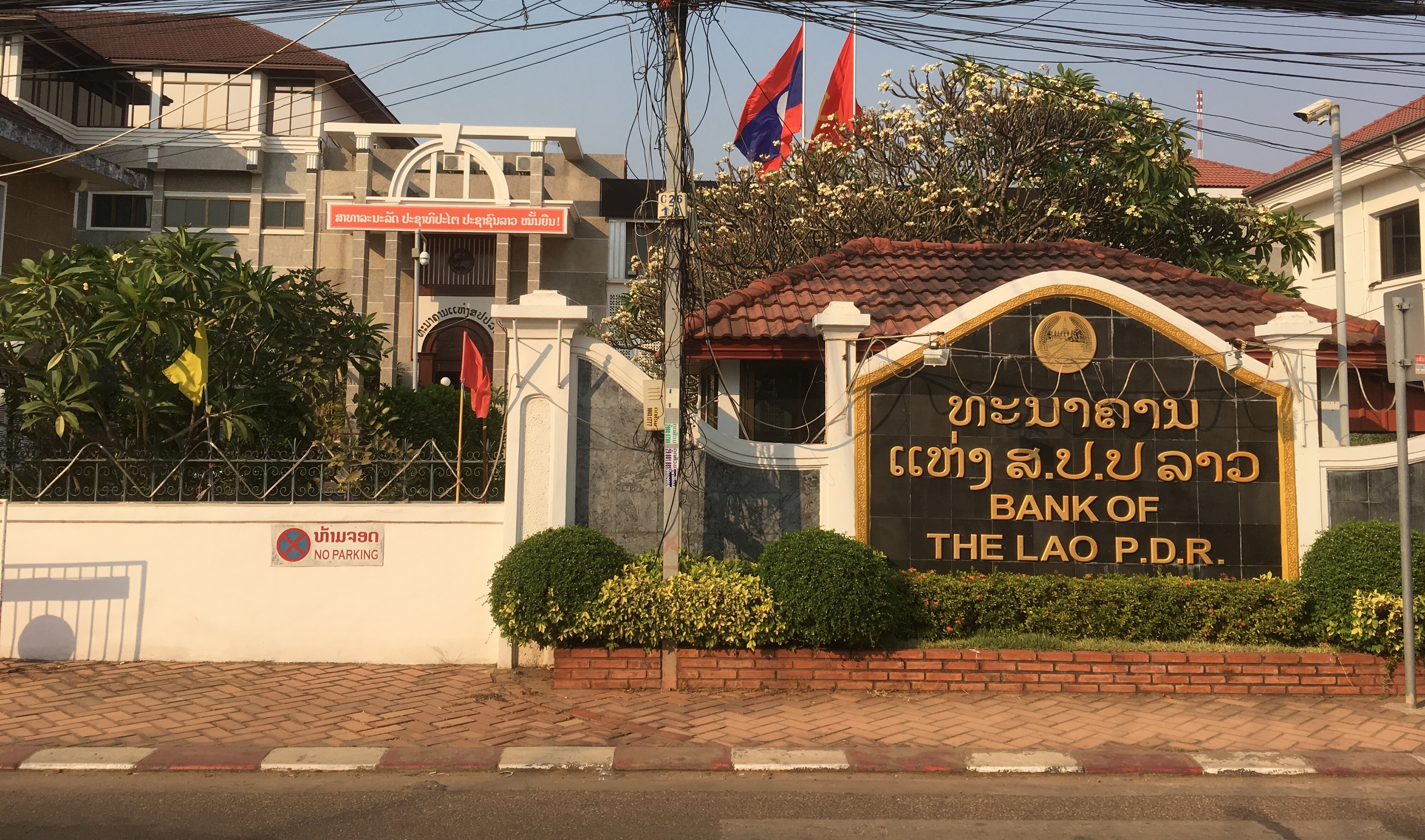
- Headquarters: Vientiane, Laos
- Coordinates: 17.9658°N 102.6070°E
- Established: 7 October 1968; 56 years ago
- Ownership: 100% state ownership
- Governor: Bounkham Vorachit
- Central bank of: Laos
- Currency: Lao kip LAK (ISO 4217)
- Reserves: ~US$ 1.0 billion
- Website: www.bol.gov.la

The Bank of the Lao P.D.R. (Lao: ທະນາຄານ ແຫ່ງ ສ. ປ. ປ. ລາວ) is the central bank of Laos. It is also the bank of last resort, controlling the money supply, managing the country's reserves, and supervising the commercial banks operating in Laos.

The bank is managed by an executive board, a governor and a deputy governor. The current governor is Bounkham Vorachit.

The Bank of Laos was formed on 7 October 1968 and has been operating since in the country's capital, Vientiane. It succeeded the National Bank of Laos, which itself had taken over in early 1955 from the French-controlled Institut d'Émission des États du Cambodge, du Laos et du Viet-nam.

== Governors ==
managing director of the National Bank (1975–1983)

- Thongchanh Uparavanh, 2 December 1975 – 1977
- Nouphanh Sithphasai, 1978–1980
- Khamphoui Keoboualapha, 1980 (3 months)
- Soth Phetrasy, 1980–1983

Chairman of the State Bank (1983–1990)

- Bousabong Souvannavong, 1983–1987
- Nouphanh Sithphasai, 1987–1988
- Pany Yathotou, 1988–1990

Governor of the State Bank (1990–present)

- Pany Yathotou, 1990–1992
- Bousabong Souvannavong, 1993–1994
- Pany Yathotou, 1995–1997
- Cheuang Sombounkhanh, 1997–1999
- Soukanh Mahalath, 1999–2001
- Phoupheth Khamphounevong, 2001–2002 (acting)
- Chanhsy Phosikham, 25 April 2002 – 1 February 2003
- Phoumy Thipphavone, 21 February 2003 – 2005
- Phoupheth Khamphounevong, 2006–2009
- Somphao Phaysith, 2009–2018
- Bounkham Vorachit, incumbent

== Lao PDR Kip (1979) ==
On 16 December 1979, the old Pathet Lao “Liberation” kip was replaced by the new Lao kip at a rate of 100 to 1.

=== Coins ===
Coins were again issued in Laos for the first time in 28 years in 1980 with denominations of 10, 20 and 50 att, with each being struck in aluminum and depicting the state emblem on the obverse and agricultural themes on the reverse. These were followed by commemorative 1, 5, 10, 20 and 50 kip in 1985 for the 10 year anniversary of the Lao People's Democratic Republic. However, due to the economic toll of the Soviet collapse in 1991 and the persistence of chronic inflation, there are no coins currently in circulation in Laos.

=== Banknotes ===
In 1979, banknotes were introduced in denominations of 1, 5, 10, 20, 50 and 100 kip. 500 kip notes were added in 1988, followed by 1000 kip in 1992, 2000 and 5000 kip in 1997, 10,000 and 20,000 kip in 2002 and 50,000 kip on January 17, 2006 (although dated 2004). On November 15, 2010, a 100,000 kip banknote was issued to commemorate the 450th anniversary of the founding of the capital, Vientiane and the 35th anniversary of the establishment of the Lao People's Democratic Republic. Kaysone Phomvihane is pictured on the obverse of the 2,000, 5,000, 10,000, 20,000, 50,000, and 100,000 kip banknotes.

The Bank of Laos governor announced on January 25, 2012, that the Bank of Laos would issue 100,000 Kip banknotes as a regular issue on February 1, 2012 (but dated 2011) to encourage Lao people to use the national currency instead of U.S. dollars and Thai baht.

Current Series
Image		Value	Description		Date of issue	Series Designation
Obverse	Reverse	Value	Obverse	Reverse	Date of issue	Series Designation
		₭1	Militia unit at left, arms at upper right.	Schoolroom scene at left.	1988	P-25a
		₭5	Shopping	Elephant Logging	1979	P-26a
		₭10	Dark brown on multicolor underprint. Lumber mill at left, arms at upper right.	Medical scenes at left.	1988	P-27a
		₭20	Arms at left, tank with troop column at center.	Brown and maroon. Textile mill at center.	1988	P-28a
		₭50	Rice Planting	Hydroelectric Dam	1979	P-29a
		₭100	Harvesting	Bridge	1979	P-30a
		₭500	Modern Irrigation	Fruit Harvesting	1988	P-31a
		₭1,000	Lao Loum, Lao Sung and Lao Theung Women	Cattle Herd	2008	P-39
		₭2,000	President Kaysone Phomevihane, Wat Xieng Thong in Luang Prabang, Laos	Hydroelectric Complex in Xeset, Laos	2011	P-41
		₭5,000	President Kaysone Phomevihane; Pha That Luang	Cement Factory in Vang Vieng	2003	P-34b
		₭10,000	President Kaysone Phomevihane; Pha That Luang	Mekong River Bridge	2003	P-35b
		₭20,000	President Kaysone Phomevihane; Haw Pra Keaw (Ho Phra Keo)	Small River Dam	2003	P-36B
		₭50,000	President Kaysone Phomevihane; Pha That Luang	Presidential Palace	2004	P-37
		₭100,000	President Kaysone Phomevihane, Pha That Luang in Vientiane, Laos	President Kaysone Phomevihane Statue and Museum, Vientiane, Laos	2011	P-42
		₭100,000	King Sethathirath statue, Pha That Luang in Vientiane, Dork Champa Flower and Naga Dragon.	Ho Phra Keo Temple in Vientiane, Laos	2010	P-40

== See also ==
- Ministry of Finance (Laos)
- List of central banks
