= Sisomphone Lovansay =

Acting President of the Standing Committee of the Supreme People's Assembly
- In office 25 November 1986 – 1 June 1989
- Preceded by: Souphanouvong
- Succeeded by: Nouhak Phoumsavanh

Head of the LPRP Central Committee Organisation Commission

2nd term
- In office 1972–1982
- General Secretary: Kaysone Phomvihane
- Preceded by: Nouhak Phoumsavanh
- Succeeded by: Samane Vignaket

1st term
- In office 1957–1964
- General Secretary: Kaysone Phomvihane
- Preceded by: Khamseng Sivilai
- Succeeded by: Nouhak Phoumsavanh

Personal details
- Born: 7 July 1916
- Died: 24 February 1993 (aged 76); Vientiane, Laos
- Political party: Lao People's Revolutionary Party

Sisomphone Lovansay (Lao: ສີສົມພອນ ລໍວັນໄຊ; 7 July 1916 – 24 February 1993) was a Tai Dam politician and member of the Lao People's Revolutionary Party (LPRP). He served as Vice President of the People's Supreme Court.

He was elected to the LPP Central Committee at the 1st National Congress and retained a seat on the body until the 5th National Congress.
