= Sali Vongkhamsao =

Laotian politician (1925–1991)

Minister of Economics, Planning, and Finance
- In office 2 June 1989 – 23 January 1991
- Prime Minister: Kaysone Phomvihane
- Preceded by: Himself (as planning committee head); Yao Phonvantha (as finance minister)
- Succeeded by: Khamphoui Keoboualapha

Deputy Prime Minister of Laos
- In office 1982 – 23 January 1991 Serving with Nouhak Phoumsavan, Phoumi Vongvichit, Phoun Sipraseuth and Khamtai Siphandon
- Prime Minister: Kaysone Phomvihane

Chairman of the State Planning Committee
- In office 1982 – 2 June 1989
- Prime Minister: Kaysone Phomvihane
- Preceded by: Ma Khaikhamphithoun
- Succeeded by: Post abolished

Personal details
- Born: 29 September 1925
- Died: 23 January 1991 (aged 65) Vientiane, Laos
- Party: Lao People's Revolutionary Party
- Occupation: Politician

Sali Vongkhamsao (Lao: ສາລີ ວົງຄໍາຊາວ; 29 September 1925 – 23 January 1991) was a Laotian politician and member of the Lao People's Revolutionary Party (LPRP).

He became a substitute member of the LPRP Central Committee, and was elected to full membership at the 3rd National Congress. Vongkhamsao was also the Minister of Economy, Planning and Finance and a member of the National Assembly. He was named Deputy Prime Minister in 1982; the same year he also became chairman of the State Planning Committee.
