= Bounpheng Mounphosay =

Laotian politician

Bounpheng Mounphosay (Lao: ບຸນເພັງ ມູນໂພໄຊ; born 1 September 1948) was a Laotian politician and member of the Lao People's Revolutionary Party. She was born in Xiangkhouang Province.

In 1990 she was appointed Governor of Xiang Khuang province, making her the first female to hold a governorship in Laotian history.

She was elected to the LPRP Central Committee at the 5th National Congress and retained a seat on the body until the 10th National Congress.
