= Onechanh Thammavong =

Laotian politician

Onechanh Thammavong (Lao: ອ່ອນຈັນ ທຳມະວົງ; born 13 May 1953) is a Laotian politician and member of the Lao People's Revolutionary Party (LPRP). She served as the Minister of Labour and Social Welfare in the 6th Government of Laos.

She is a former president of the Lao Women's Union, succeeding Khampheng Boupha in 1988.
