= Khampheng Boupha =

Laotian politician

- ຄຳແພງ ບຸບຜາ

Personal details
- Born: 15 January 1923; Luang Prabang, Laos
- Died: 2011 (aged 87–88)
- Political party: Lao People's Revolutionary Party
- Spouse: Khamphay Boupha (m. 1943)
- Occupation: Teacher

Khampheng Boupha (Lao: ຄຳແພງ ບຸບຜາ; 15 January 1923 – 2011) was a Laotian politician who served as a member of the Central Committee of the Lao People's Revolutionary Party and President of the Lao Women's Union.

== Early life ==
Khampheng Boupha was born in Luang Prabang and completed her schooling from there.

== Career ==
Khampheng began her career as a teacher and later took up translation work. From 1946 to 1949, she stayed in Thailand with her husband, a member of the Lao Issara government. A year later, both of them joined the Free Laos Front. She won the May 1958 supplementary elections for Luang Prabang and became a member of the National Assembly of Laos. It was during this time that the Boupha couple was actively involved with the Pathet Lao communist movement in Vietnam.

In 1979, Khampheng became a member of the newly formed Lao Front for National Development's Standing Committee and three years later was elected to the Central Committee of the Lao People's Revolutionary Party. Owing to health issues, she did not stand for re-election. She also served as president of Lao Women's Union and Secretary of State for Rural Affairs.

== Personal life ==
In 1943, Khampheng married Khamphay Boupha, who served as the Laotian deputy minister of foreign affairs from 1975 to 1985. Kampheng Boupha died in 2011.
