= 4th National Congress of the Lao People's Revolutionary Party =

- Date: 13–15 November 1986 (3 days)
- Participants: 300 delegates
- Outcome: The election of the 4th Central Committee

The 4th National Congress of the Lao People's Revolutionary Party (LPRP) was held in Vientiane on 13–15 November 1986. The congress occurs once every five years. A total of 300 delegates represented the party's nearly 45,000 card-carrying members.
