= Thongsing Thammavong =

Laotian politician

- ທອງສິງ ທຳມະວົງ
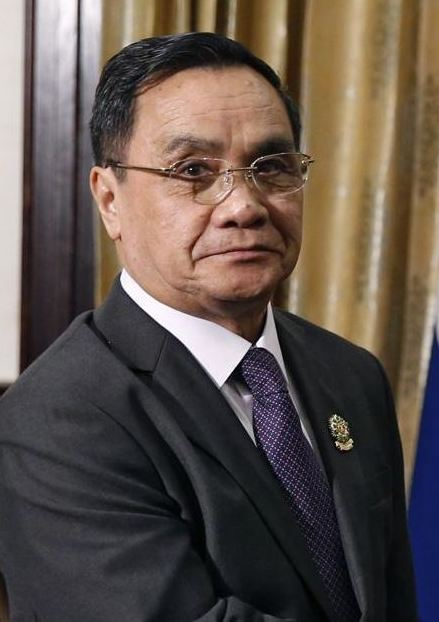
- Thongsing in 2014

16th Prime Minister of Laos

7th Government
- In office 15 June 2011 – 20 April 2016
- President: Choummaly Sayasone
- Succeeded by: Thongloun Sisoulith

6th Government
- In office 23 December 2010 – 15 June 2011
- President: Choummaly Sayasone
- Preceded by: Bouasone Bouphavanh

President of the National Assembly of Laos

6th term
- In office 8 June 2006 – 23 December 2010
- Preceded by: Samane Vignaket
- Succeeded by: Pany Yathotou

Head of the LPRP Central Committee Organisation Commission

7th term
- In office 2001–2002
- Chairman: Khamtai Siphandon
- Succeeded by: Bounthong Chitmany

6th term
- In office 1996–2001
- Chairman: Khamtai Siphandon

5th term
- In office 1991–1996
- Chairman: Khamtai Siphandon; Kaysone Phomvihane
- Preceded by: Oudom Khattigna

Personal details
- Born: 12 April 1944 (age 82) Laos
- Party: People's Revolutionary Party
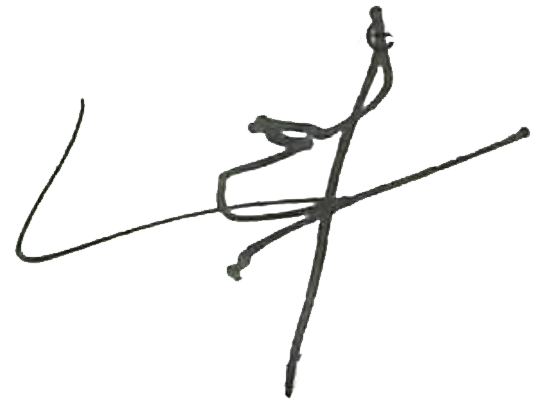
- Signature

Thongsing Thammavong (Lao: ທອງສິງ ທຳມະວົງ; born 12 April 1944) is a Laotian politician who was the Prime Minister of Laos from 2010 to 2016. He is a member of the Lao People's Revolutionary Party (LPRP) and has been a member of the LPRP Politburo since 1991. He currently serves in the National Assembly of Laos, representing Luang Prabang Province (Constituency 6), and was the President of the National Assembly from 2006 to 2010. He became Prime Minister on 23 December 2010, and left office on 20 April 2016.

Political offices
Preceded by Bouasone Bouphavanh	Prime Minister of Laos; 2010–2016	Succeeded by Thongloun Sisoulith
