= Khamsay Souphanouvong =

Laotian politician

- ຄຳແສນ ສຸພານຸວົງ

Minister of Finance
- In office 15 August 1991 – 1995
- Prime Minister: Khamtai Siphandon
- Preceded by: Khamphoui Keoboualapha
- Succeeded by: Saysomphone Phomvihane

Personal details
- Born: 1943 (age 82–83) North Vietnam
- Party: Lao People's Revolutionary Party
- Occupation: Politician

Khamsay Souphanouvong is a Laotian politician, refugee, and a former leading member of the Lao People's Revolutionary Party (LPRP). He was born in 1943 and is the son of Souphanouvong, the former head of state. He served as Minister of Finance from 1991 until 1995.

He was elected to the LPRP Central Committee at the 5th National Congress and sat for one term.

== History ==
In November 2000, it was reported that Khamsay sought political asylum in New Zealand. It was confirmed by then Prime Minister of New Zealand Helen Clark.
