= Oudom Khattigna =

Laotian politician

- ອຸດົມ ຂັດຕິຍະ
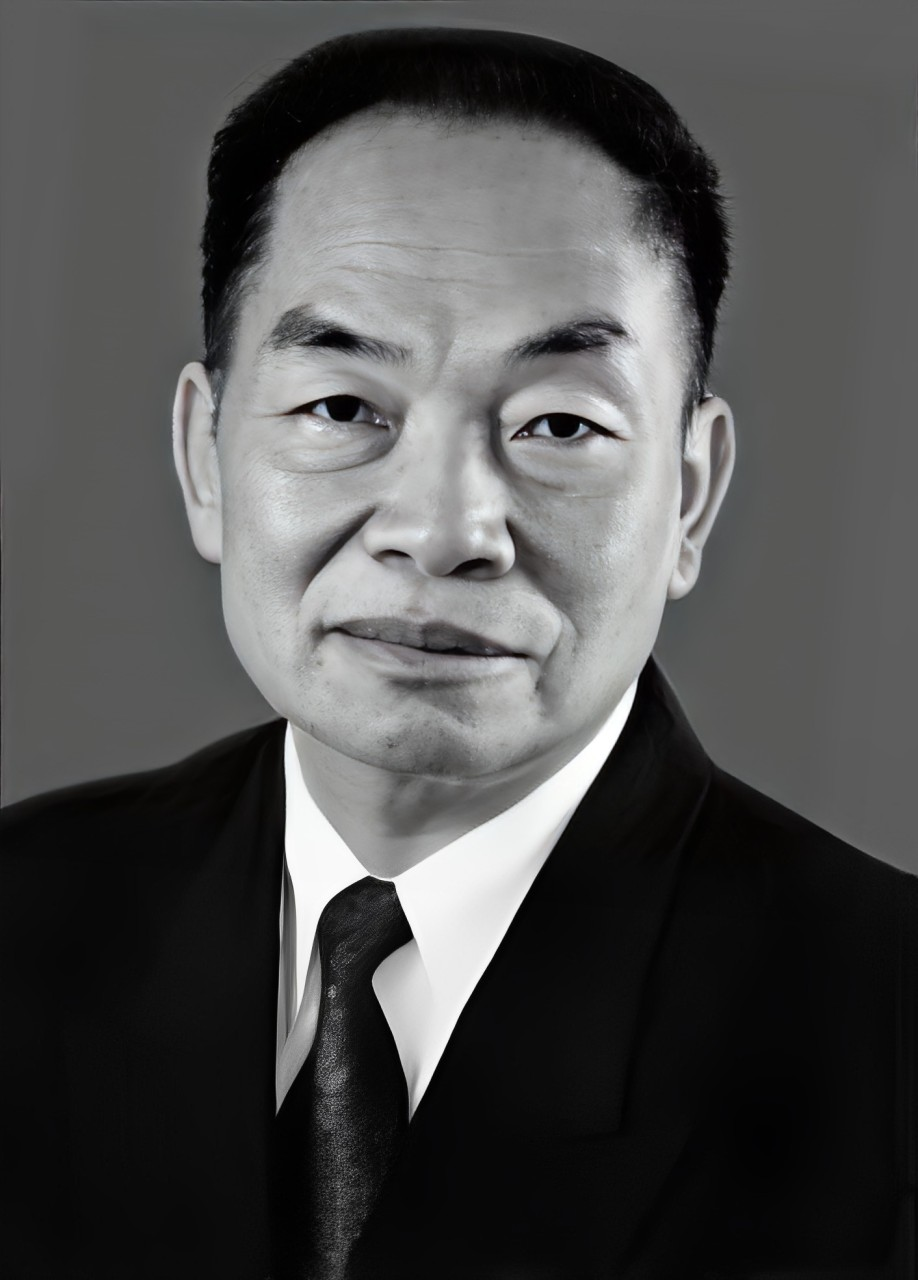
- Khattigna c. 1960s

Vice President of Laos
- In office 24 February 1998 – 9 December 1999
- President: Khamtai Siphandon
- Preceded by: Sisavath Keobounphanh
- Succeeded by: Choummaly Sayasone

Head of the LPRP Central Committee Organisation Commission

4th term
- In office 1990–1991
- General Secretary: Kaysone Phomvihane
- Preceded by: Maichantan Sengmani
- Succeeded by: Thongsing Thammavong

Personal details
- Born: 3 March 1931
- Died: 9 December 1999 (aged 68) Vientiane, Laos
- Party: Lao People's Revolutionary Party
- Occupation: Politician

Oudom Khattigna (Lao: ອຸດົມ ຂັດຕິຍະ; 3 March 1931 – 9 December 1999) was the 2nd Vice President of Laos from 1998 to 1999. He died in office.

Political offices
Preceded by Sisavath Keobounphanh	Vice President of Laos; 1998-1999	Succeeded by Choummaly Sayasone
