= Chaleun Yiapaoher =

Laotian lawyer and politician

Chaleun Yiapaoher (Lao: ຈະເລີນ ເຢຍປາວເຮີ; born 15 September 1951) is a Laotian lawyer and politician. He served as Minister of Justice of Laos.
