= Ministry of Finance (Laos) =

Government ministry of Laos

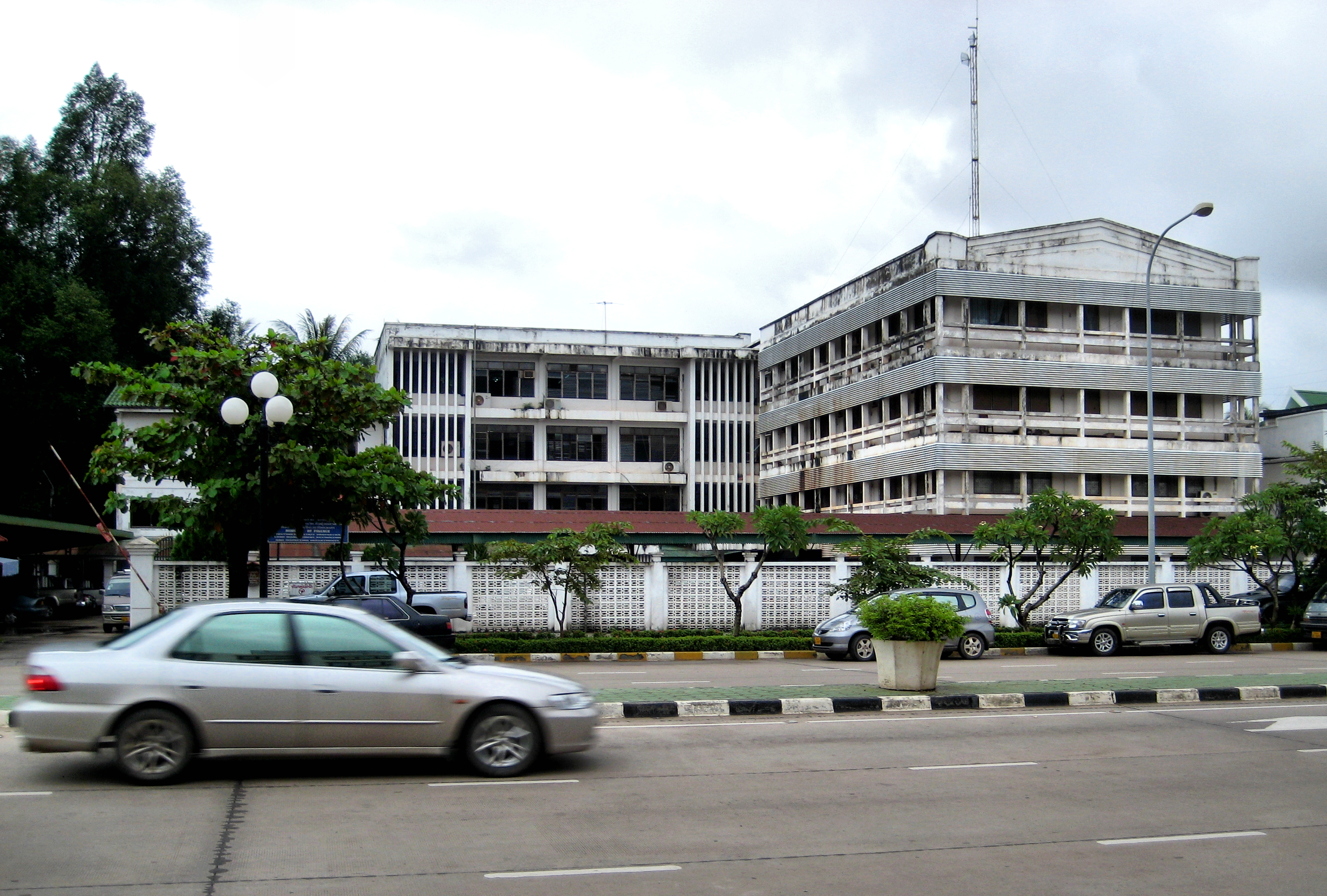

Agency overview
- Formed: 1947
- Jurisdiction: Laos
- Headquarters: 23 Singha Road, Vientiane
- Agency executive: Santiphab Phomvihane, Minister
- Parent agency: Government of Laos
- Website: www.mof.gov.la/index.php/en/home/

The Ministry of Finance is a government ministry of Laos responsible for public finances according to party regulation, guideline and policy.

== Ministers of Finance of the Kingdom of Laos ==
- Outhong Souvannavong, 1947
- Leuam Insisiengmay, 1947–1949
- Phao Panya, 1949–1950
- Katay Don Sasorith, 1951–1954
- Leuam Insisiengmay, 1954–1958
- Leuam Rajasombath, 1958–1959
- Leuam Insisiengmay, 1959
- Somsanith Vongkotrattana, 1959–1960
- Leuam Rajasombath, 1960
- Inpeng Sourignatay, 1960
- Khamking Souvanlasy, 1960
- Inpeng Souriyathay, 1960
- Phouangphet Phanareth, 1960–1962
- Phoumi Nosavan, 1962–1965
- Sisouk na Champassak, 1965–1974
- Ngon Sananikone, 1974–1975
- Leuam Rajasombath, 1975

== Ministers of Finance of the Lao People's Democratic Republic ==
- Nouhak Phoumsavanh, 1975–1983
- Yao Phonvantha, 1983–1989
- Sali Vongkhamsao, 1989–1991
- Khamphoui Keoboualapha, 1991
- Khamsay Souphanouvong, 1991–1995
- Xaysomphone Phomvihane, 1995–1998
- Khamphoui Keoboualapha, 1998–1999
- Bounnhang Vorachit, 1999–2001
- Soukanh Mahalath, 2001–2003
- Chansy Phosikham, 2003–2007
- Somdy Duangdy, 2007–2011
- Phouphet Khamphounvong, 2011–2014
- Lien Thikeo, 2014–2016
- Somdy Duangdy, 2016–2021
- Bounchom Oubonpaserth, 2021–2023
- Santiphab Phomvihane, 2023–present

== See also ==
- Government of Laos
- Bank of the Lao P.D.R.
- Economy of Laos
