= Osakanh Thammatheva =

Laotian politician

Head of the LPRP Central Committee Propaganda and Training Board
- In office 1990–2004
- General Secretary: Khamtai Siphandone; Kaysone Phomvihane
- Preceded by: Maichantan Sengmani
- Succeeded by: Mounkeo Oraboun

Personal details
- Born: 13 March 1936
- Died: 31 October 2004 (aged 68) Vientiane, Laos
- Party: Lao People's Revolutionary Party
- Occupation: Politician

Osakanh Thammatheva (Lao: ໂອສະກັນ ທໍາມະເທວາ; born 13 March 1936 – died 31 October 2004) was a Laotian politician and member of the Lao People's Revolutionary Party. He was born in Voeunsai, Rattanakhiri province, Cambodia.

He was elected to the LPRP Central Committee at the 3rd National Congress and retained a seat on the body until his death on 31 October 2004.
