= Soulivong Daravong =

Laotian politician and economist

Minister of Energy and Mining
- In office 2012 – 20 April 2016
- Prime Minister: Thongsing Thammavong; Bouasone Bouphavanh
- Preceded by: Bosaykham Vongdara
- Succeeded by: Khammany Inthirath

Minister of Planning and Investment
- In office 8 June 2006 – 2012
- Prime Minister: Thongsing Thammavong; Bouasone Bouphavanh
- Preceded by: Thongloun Sisoulith
- Succeeded by: Somdy Duangdy

Personal details
- Born: 1 May 1949 (age 77) Xieng Khouang Province, Laos
- Party: Lao People's Revolutionary Party
- Education: Université de Montréal

Soulivong Daravong (Lao: ສຸລິວົງ ດາລາວົງ; born 1 May 1949) is a Laotian politician and economist born in Xieng Khouang Province. He served as Minister of Planning and Investment of Laos. He studied engineering at Montreal University in Canada, graduating in 1974. Daravong also served as the Minister of Energy and Mines of Laos.
