= Samane Vignaket =

Laotian politician (1927–2016)

President of the National Assembly of Laos

5th term
- In office 30 September 2002 – 2005
- Succeeded by: Thongsing Thammavong

4th term
- In office 24 February 1998 – 30 September 2002

3rd term
- In office 25 February 1993 – 24 February 1998
- Preceded by: Nouhak Phoumsavanh

Minister of Education

2nd term
- In office 1988–1991
- Prime Minister: Kaysone Phomvihane
- Preceded by: Bountiam Pitsami

Head of the LPRP Central Committee Organisation Commission

4th term
- In office 1986–1989
- General Secretary: Kaysone Phomvihane
- Succeeded by: Maichantan Sengmani

3rd term
- In office 1982–1986
- General Secretary: Kaysone Phomvihane
- Preceded by: Sisomphone Lovansay

Personal details
- Born: 3 March 1927 Phichit Province, Siam
- Died: 22 July 2016 (aged 89) Vientiane, Laos
- Party: Lao People's Revolutionary Party

Samane Vignaket (Lao: ສະໝານ ວິຍະເກດ; 3 March 1927 – 22 July 2016) was a Laotian politician and Lieutenant General, who served as the 1st President of the National Assembly of Laos from 1993 to 2006. A member of the Lao People's Revolutionary Party, Vignaket served as a member of the 4th, 5th, 6th, 7th and 8th Politburo and was a member of the 3rd Secretariat of the LPRP, including as Minister of Education from 1988-1991.

== Life and career ==
Vignaket was born in Phichit Province, Siam to a Vietnamese immigrant family. (In official biography before he died, he was identified that he was born in Attapeu Province.) In 1975 he was appointed as vice minister of defence, serving until 1981. Vignaket was elected as Head of the LPRP Central Committee Organization Board in 1982 and again in 1986, serving until 1989. Through this role, he was in charge of ideological and cultural works of the Lao People's Revolutionary Party (LPRP).

=== Death ===
He died at 00.24 am on July 22, 2016 at the age of 89.
