= Nouhak Phoumsavanh =

Laotian revolutionary and politician who served as President of Laos from 1992 to 1998

- ໜູຮັກ ພູມສະຫວັນ

3rd President of Laos
- In office 25 November 1992 – 24 February 1998
- Prime Minister: Khamtai Siphandone
- Vice President: Sisavath Keobounphanh
- Preceded by: Kaysone Phomvihane
- Succeeded by: Khamtai Siphandone

President of the National Assembly of Laos

2nd term
- In office 1 June 1989 – 25 November 1992
- Preceded by: Sisomphon Lovansay (acting)
- Succeeded by: Samane Vignaket

Deputy Prime Minister of Laos

1st term
- In office 2 December 1975 – January 1982 Serving with Phoumi Vongvichit, Phoun Sipaseut and Khamtai Siphandone
- Prime Minister: Kaysone Phomvihane

Minister of Finance

1st term
- In office 2 December 1975 – 1983
- Prime Minister: Kaysone Phomvihane
- Preceded by: Post established
- Succeeded by: Yao Phonvantha

Head of the LPRP Central Committee Organisation Commission

1st term
- In office 1964–1972
- General Secretary: Kaysone Phomvihane
- Preceded by: Sisomphone Lovansay
- Succeeded by: Sisomphone Lovansay

Personal details
- Born: 9 April 1914 Mukdahan, Siam
- Died: 9 September 2008 (aged 94) Vientiane, Laos
- Resting place: Laotian National Revolutionary Cemetery
- Party: Lao People's Revolutionary Party

Nouhak Phoumsavanh or Phoumsavan (Lao: ໜູຮັກ ພູມສະຫວັນ; Thai: หนูฮัก พูมสะหวัน; 9 April 1914– 9 September 2008) was a long time Pathet Lao revolutionary and communist party official who was the 3rd President of Laos, serving from 1992 to 1998.

== Life ==
Nouhak was born in Ban Phalouka in Mukdahan Province, Siam (now Thailand) in 1914, according to official sources, although his year of birth has also been given as 1910. He married his first wife, Chanthome, in 1933 and they had four children, Phouthone, Phonesavanh, Khankeo and a son. He later remarried in 1944 to Bounema, who was of Vietnamese descent.

== Political career ==
He was a founding member of the Lao revolutionary movement in 1945, and he became Chairman of the Lao Resistance Committee for the Eastern Region in 1949. In the Lao Resistance Government, he was named Minister of Finance in 1950. He participated in the founding congress of the Lao People's Party (later renamed the Lao People's Revolutionary Party, LPRP) in 1955 and was elected as the second-ranking member of its Central Committee (Deputy Director of the Central Committee).

Nouhak was subsequently the secretary of the Lao People's Party cell in Vientiane, the capital, and was a member of the National Assembly in 1958. He was arrested in 1959 and spent a year in prison in Vientiane before escaping along with Souphanouvong. He was then secretary of the party cell in Khangkhay and had important roles in the party during the 1960s and 1970s, while the Laotian Civil War was ongoing. He was elected to the Politburo at the LPRP's 2nd Congress in February 1972 and was assigned responsibility for economic affairs.

When the Pathet Lao took power in December 1975, Nouhak was appointed Deputy Prime Minister and Minister of Finance. For years, he was considered "Number 2" in the leadership under Prime Minister Kaysone Phomvihane. He was elected as First Vice-Chairman of the Council of Ministers in April 1982, then as a standing member of the Council of Ministers in charge of economic affairs in November 1986. Nouhak was subsequently elected to the Supreme People's Assembly in 1989 and became President of the Supreme People's Assembly in the same year. Also in 1989, he was chosen as chairman of the commission charged with drafting a new constitution, which was adopted in 1991. With the adoption of this constitution, Kaysone assumed the presidency, which was transformed from a ceremonial to an executive position. After Kaysone's death, Nouhak was elected to succeed him as President of Laos by the Supreme People's Assembly in an extraordinary session on November 25, 1992.

At the same time, Prime Minister Khamtai Siphandone succeeded Kaysone as leader of the LPRP. As a result, despite the presidency's executive powers, Khamtai was now the de facto leader of Laos, outranking Nouhak. When Khamtai decided to move from Prime Minister to President in 1998, Nouhak, who was by then one of the oldest heads of state in the world, retired, leaving office on 24 February 1998.

Nouhak remained on the Central Committee and Politburo of the LPRP until the party's 6th Congress in 1996. At the 6th Congress in 1996 and the 7th Congress in 2001, he was named as Adviser to the Central Committee's Executive Committee. He reportedly remained in good health throughout his old age, and he was said to have continued making visits to the provinces by helicopter until 2007.

== Later life ==
Nouhak died on 9 September 2008 at the age of 94. The state news agency attributed his death simply to "old age", while noting that he had received medical treatment both in Laos and outside the country. A committee of 26 members, including leading party and state figures (with President Choummaly Sayasone as its chairman), was formed to organize his funeral, and a five-day national mourning period was declared for 10–14 September, during which time all entertainment was prohibited. He was cremated in Vientiane on 14 September.

In 2011, a memorial honoring him was erected at his birthplace in Mukdahan Province.

== Honours ==
- Soviet Union : Order of the October Revolution (1984)
- Spain : Collar of the Order of Civil Merit (1995)
- Thailand : Knight Grand Cordon (Special Class) of the Order of the White Elephant (1995)
- Argentina : Collar of the Order of the Liberator General San Martín (1996)
- Norway : Grand Cross with Collar of the Order of St. Olav (1997)

Political offices
Preceded by Kaysone Phomvihane	President of Laos; 1992–1998	Succeeded by Khamtai Siphandon
