= 3rd National Congress of the Lao People's Revolutionary Party =

- Date: 27–30 April 1982 (four days)
- Participants: 228 delegates
- Outcome: Election of 3rd Central Committee

The 3rd National Congress of the Lao People's Revolutionary Party (LPRP) was held in Vientiane from 27 to 30 April 1982, five years after the 2nd, with nearly 35,000 card-carrying members represented by 228 delegates.
