= 2nd National Congress of the Lao People's Revolutionary Party =

- Date: 3–6 February 1972 (4 days)
- Participants: 125 delegates
- Outcome: The election of the 2nd Central Committee

The 2nd National Congress of the Lao People's Revolutionary Party (LPRP) was held in Vientiane on 3–6 February 1972. The congress occurs once every five years. A total of 125 delegates represented the party's nearly 21,000 card-carrying members.

The 2nd National Congress renamed the party; from Lao People's Party to the Lao People's Revolutionary Party.
