= Sisavath Keobounphanh =

Laotian politician (1928–2020)

- ສີສະຫວາດ ແກ້ວບຸນພັນ
- Keobounphanh in 2000

13th Prime Minister of Laos
- In office 24 February 1998 – 27 March 2001
- President: Khamtai Siphandone
- Preceded by: Khamtai Siphandone
- Succeeded by: Bounnhang Vorachith

1st Vice President of Laos
- In office 1996–1998
- President: Nouhak Phoumsavanh
- Preceded by: Position created
- Succeeded by: Oudom Khattigna

Personal details
- Born: 1 May 1928; Houaphanh Province, French Indochina
- Died: 12 May 2020 (aged 92); Vientiane, Lao P.D.R.
- Political party: Lao People's Revolutionary Party
- Spouse: La Keobounphanh

Sisavath Keobounphanh (Lao: ສີສະຫວາດ ແກ້ວບຸນພັນ; 1 May 1928 – 12 May 2020) was Vice President of Laos from 1996 to 1998 and third Chairman of the Council of Ministers (Prime Minister) of Laos from 1998 to 2000. He was succeeded by Bounnhang Vorachith. He was a member of the Lao People's Revolutionary Party and was President of the Lao Front for National Construction from 2001 to 2011, when he was succeeded by Phandoungchit Vongsa.

Political offices
Preceded by New position	Vice President of Laos; 1996-1998	Succeeded by Oudom Khattigna
Preceded by Khamtai Siphandone	Prime Minister of Laos; 1998-2001	Succeeded by Boungnang Vorachith
