= Central Committee of the Lao People's Revolutionary Party =

Highest organ between National Congresses

The Central Committee of the Lao People's Revolutionary Party (LPRP) is the highest organ between the two national congresses.

== Functions and tasks ==
The Central Executive Committee of the Party is the highest leadership body of the Lao People's Revolutionary Party between two Party Congresses, with the following powers and duties:

=== Mission ===
- Prepare and convene the National Congress of Delegates. Mid-term National Conference of the Party;
- Lead the implementation of the National Congress resolutions, the Party Charter, and the Party Central Committee resolutions;
- Building solidarity and unity within the Party is the center of the solidarity of the entire Party;
- Research and agree on important issues of strategic and foreign policy nature;
- Leadership of national defense and security work;
- Unify and lead the implementation of policies on organization, Party building and cadre work, Lao Fatherland Front work, Veterans work, mass organization work and Party financial work;
- Party representatives exchange with political parties of strategic friendly countries and political parties of other countries;

=== Power ===
- Consider and decide to elect (from official members) and dismiss the General Secretary, Politburo members, and Central Secretariat members;
- Consider and decide on the election of additional members (from alternate members) and dismissal of Central Party Committee members;
- Determine the number, structure, standards and conditions of Central Party Committee members, Politburo members and Central Party Secretaries;
- Listen to reports and inspect the leadership activities of the Central Party Politburo and the Central Party Secretariat periodically twice a year;
- Decision to approve resolutions issued by the Politburo and the Central Secretariat;
- Issue regulations, instructions, decisions;
- Supervise the activities of the Central Party's advisory and support agencies;
- Supervise the activities of each member elected by the Central Party Committee;
- Some other tasks as prescribed.

== History ==
The Central Committee was established at the 1st National Congress in 1955. At the 2nd LPRP National Congress, held on 3–6 February 1972, it established the Politburo and the Secretariat.

=== Terms ===
Term	Gender		Type		Reelected	Period		Duration
Term	Male	Female	Members	Alternates	Reelected	Start	End	Duration
1st	16	0	16	—	13	14 April 1955	3 February 1972	16 years, 295 days
2nd	28	1	23	6	28	6 February 1972	30 April 1982	10 years, 83 days
3rd	55	4	49	6	40	30 April 1982	15 November 1986	4 years, 199 days
4th	55	5	51	9	33	15 November 1986	29 March 1991	4 years, 134 days
5th	55	4	55	4	35	29 March 1991	20 March 1996	4 years, 357 days
6th	45	4	49	—	38	20 March 1996	18 March 2001	4 years, 363 days
7th	50	3	53	—	36	14 March 2001	21 March 2006	5 years, 7 days
8th	51	4	55	—	42	21 March 2006	21 March 2011	5 years, 0 days
9th	56	5	61	—	39	21 March 2011	22 January 2016	4 years, 307 days
10th	67	10	69	8	46	22 January 2016	15 January 2021	4 years, 359 days
11th	67	14	71	10	52	15 January 2021	8 January 2026	4 years, 358 days
12th	75	13	73	15	—	8 January 2026	Incumbent	29 days

== Affiliated agencies ==
The Central Executive Committee of the Party has the following affiliated agencies:

- Administrative Office
- External Relations Committee
- Inspection Commission
- Propaganda and Training Board
- Organisation Commission
- Defence and Public Security Commission
- National Institute of Politics and Public Administration
- Pasaxon Newspaper

== See also ==
- Lao People's Revolutionary Party
- Politburo of the Lao People's Revolutionary Party
- Secretariat of the Lao People's Revolutionary Party

== Bibliography ==
Books:

- Stuart-Fox, Martin (2008). Historical Dictionary of Laos. Scarecrow Press. ISBN 978-0-81086-411-5.
