= Freedom of the press in Laos =

Laos has one of the most restrictive media environments in the world. In 2020, Reporters Without Borders ranked Laos 172 out of 179 on its annual Press Freedom Index, behind countries such as Cuba and Iran.

The Laotian government exerts almost total control over the press. Nearly all media organizations in Laos are government-owned and some Laotian journalists are party members attached to the government.

== Regulations ==
According to Article 44 of the Laos’ 2003 constitution, Lao citizens are guaranteed "the right and freedom of speech".

However Article 23 of the constitution makes it clear that the state has ultimate authority over the press since it "attends to improving and expanding mass media activities for the purpose of national protection and development." It also says that "…mass media activities which are detrimental to national interests or the fine traditional culture and dignity of [the] Lao people are prohibited."

In addition, Article 65 of the 2005 Penal Law of Laos, says that any person circulating information or images "detrimental to the Lao People's Democratic Republic or are for the purpose of undermining or weakening State authority" may be fined and imprisoned for up to five years.

In July 2008, the Lao National Assembly approved a new press law, which included an article stating that media representatives have the right of access to government information. In practice, government officials often reply "no comment" when pressed for information or use delaying tactics, such as requiring reporters to submit official letters from their publication when seeking even routine statistics or comment.

Laos has one of the lowest levels of internet penetration in the world, with just 14 percent of the population using the internet in 2015. In 2014, the Lao government adopted an Internet law that it claimed would support the growth of the Internet.

However the law included a number of restrictions on social media and other internet communications. It required website operators to verify information "before disseminating it on their web page" and says that information that has not been approved by the state or state media "cannot be used officially." It also extends restrictions on traditional media to the internet, and bans supporting online campaigns "that seek to divide solidarity among ethnic groups and countries," spreading information that might lead to social disorder and tarnishing the "dignity and rights of individuals, sectors, institutions or organizations."

The law also requires users to register for social media accounts using their real names, and bans the use of pseudonyms.

In addition, a presidential decree issued in November 2015 ordered foreign journalists in Laos to submit their reporting to the Ministry of Foreign Affairs before publication or broadcast

== News Agency and newspapers ==
The official news agency, Khaosan Pathet Lao (KPL), supplies information to other media outlets under government regulations.

There are about 24 regularly printed newspapers in Laos, and all are government affiliated. Newspapers in Laos are described by the Southeast Asian Press Alliance as a "mouthpiece" rather than watchdog of the state. Laotian newspapers such as the national newspaper Pasason ("The People") and the daily Vientiane Mai ("Vientiane Message") are under strict control of Ministry of Information and Culture. Two foreign language papers, the English-language daily Vientiane Times and the French-language weekly Le Rénovateur are both published by Lao Press in Foreign Languages, a specialized agency of the Ministry of Information and Culture. One of the Vientiane Times’ founders was former director general and editor-in-chief of this agency. The newspaper says on its website that it reflects government policy.

Discussion of controversial topics is handled carefully. For example, during the controversial repatriation of ethnic Hmong people to Laos from Thailand in 2009, government media did not report on allegations that the refugees were short of food and basic necessities. Instead, the English language Vientiane Times praised their living conditions and described them as living in government operated "development villages." Several privately owned periodicals that cover business, society and non-political issues are allowed to publish without the government approving their content in advance. However they may face penalties after publication if the government disapproves of their content.

== Broadcasting ==
There are 32 television stations and 44 radio stations in Laos, all state-owned. Two Lao government-run television stations broadcast local news without English programs. Lao National Television (LNT) is the state television station. However, with the establishment of cable TV service in Laos under cooperation with a Chinese company, subscribers now have access to up to 30 foreign television channels including BBC, CNN, and channels from countries including China and Thailand.

Given the fact that newspapers and TV stations are often not available in the countryside, Lao National Radio (LNR), the national radio station, is the most important media outlet for people roughly 70 percent of the country. It broadcasts international news from sources like CNN and China's Xinhua News Agency.

However its content is closely supervised by the government. In a 2013 UNESCO report, a senior executive of LNR told the agency that its editors have weekly meetings with the Ministry of Information. During the meetings, they receive responses to critical reporting or news that has a "negative impact on policies and the State. Journalists who are critical of the government will be either warned or restricted in their coverage."

== Internet ==
The Lao National Internet Committee under the office of the Prime Minister administers the internet system. Under government control, critical content of government and policies can be blocked. All internet service providers must submit quarterly reports and provide article links to the government to facilitate monitoring. People and internet service providers who violate controls will be punished, and online criticism of the government and the Communist Party is prohibited.

The government does not block major foreign news sources and it is unable to control blogging or the establishment of new websites.

== International media in Laos ==
Though international news from foreign news sources have limited exposure in Laos, foreign publications are difficult to find outside its capital, Vientiane. Newsweek, The Economist, Time and the Bangkok Post are available in Vientiane minimarkets.

In 2011, the Vietnamese Nhân Dân (The People) and the Chinese Xinhua News Agency were allowed to open bureaus in Vientiane.

== Journalist safety in Laos ==
The indicative relationship between media and government protects journalists to some extent, since media needs approval before publication and their news sources are mostly government.

Now there are three known journalists imprisoned in Laos due to violations of the media law.

== See also ==
- Laos
- Freedom of the press
- Human Rights in Laos
- List of Newspapers in Laos
- Telecommunications in Laos
- Internet in Laos
