= List of newspapers in Laos =

This is a list of newspapers in Laos.

- Pasaxon (Lao, of the Lao People's Revolutionary Party)
- Pathet Lao (Lao)
- Le Rénovateur (French, state-run)
- Vientiane Mai (Lao, state-run)
- Vientiane Times (English, state-run)
- Laotian Times (English)
- Lao Phattana news (Lao)

== See also ==
- Communications in Laos
- Actual list with newspapers in Laos
