= Laos and the World Bank =

Laos and the World Bank are the international relations between Laos and the World Bank. Laos joined the World Bank on July 5, 1961.

As of 2024, the World Bank had 28 ongoing projects in Laos, with a total funding value of $938 million (USD). Majority of the projects (23) and funding ($883 million) is financed by the International Development Association (IDA), the agency within the World Bank that offers highly concessional rates to poorer developing countries. The World Bank also states that the International Finance Corporation (IFC), an agency dedicated to private sector projects, is active in Laos, working "mainly in the power, banking, manufacturing, and service sectors." Five policy areas are targeted by the World Bank for reform, including raising public revenue, improving expenditure efficiency, restructuring public debt, strengthening financial sector stability, and improving exports and business environments. The 2023-26 Country Partnership Framework outlines these plans, advising on macroeconomic and debt-related policy. The World Bank Country Manager for Laos is Alex Kramer.

World Bank projects in Laos include the 2020 COVID-19 Response Project and the 2018 Competitiveness and Trade Project, which aimed to vaccinate the population, mitigating the spread of disease, and help businesses recover from the economic effects of the pandemic, respectively. Other projects in Laos include the 2003 Scaling-Up Participatory Sustainable Forest Management Project, which strengthened relationships between forest villages and local governments, the 2019 Reducing Rural Poverty and Malnutrition Project, and the Southeast Asia Regional Economic Corridor and Connectivity Project, expected to be completed in May 2028. Most recently, phase 2 of the Health and Nutrition Services Access Project approved in February of 2024, will help over 7.5 million receive improved access to essential health services and aims to nutrition in rural areas. Funded by the World Bank, the Australian Government, Gavi (the Vaccine Alliance), and the Global Fund, the second phase of the project aims to provide more services and raise greater awareness in rural upland areas.

== Effects of economic reform ==
As a part of their initiative to raise public revenue for education, health, and social protection, the World Bank asked Laos to "increase taxes on cigarettes and alcohol as part of efforts to address high inflation and currency depreciation." According to Radio Free Asia, Laos has accrued $18.7 billion since the end of 2022, which has "destabilized the country's macroeconomy and slowed economic growth." Most of the investors in Laos are from China and Vietnam, with over half of the national debt owed to China. The World Bank has predicted that service payments as a result of rising debt could be as much as 39% GDP, as the Lao Kip has depreciated 21% against the US dollar and 29% against the Thai baht last year, caused by a shortage of foreign currency to pay back the debt. In an interview with an official from the Bank of the Lao PDR, Radio Free Asia reports that the control of exchange rates and law enforcement on foreign currency management has failed. In December the Lao Ministry of Industry and Trade required all imports and exports to be registered with the government and conduct transactions solely through Lao banks, which may be causing business people in Laos to turn to the black market for foreign currency. In January 2023, Vientiane Times reported the growth model of the World Bank to be limited in job creation, with high public debt fueling instability and threatening future development.

== Criticisms ==
The World Bank projects in Laos have previously received criticisms for the effects of policies promoting deregulation and foreign investment. In a 2014 publication the Oakland Institute criticized the World Bank's IFC for funding the Vietnamese corporations Hoang Anh Gia Lai (HAGL) and Vietnam Rubber Group (VRG), who have commonly used violence along with local authorities to seize natural resources with no accountability. Land investment law requires compensation and relocation for displaced and affected communities, but the lack of formal land tenure and enforcement has led to forced evictions and human rights violations. The Association of Southeast Asian Nations (ASEAN) Energy Database System has also criticized the World Bank for committing to high-risk hydropower dam projects despite the opposition of water and development experts. After the collapse of the Xe-Pian Xe-Namnoy saddle dam in Southern Laos and the failure of the Nam Theun 2 (NT2) dam, which flooded farmland and deprived villagers of food and crops for income, many officials in Laos are hesitant to support the 140 hydropower dams planning to be built by the Lao government. Critics argue that social and environmental risk must be accounted for in the mega-dam projects, arguing for greater community engagement with government projects and the consideration of alternatives to hydropower altogether.
