= Pathet Lao (newspaper) =

- Type: Weekly newspaper
- Format: Print, online
- Owner(s): KPL
- Founded: 1968
- Political alignment: Pro-government
- Language: Lao, French, English
- Headquarters: Laos
- Website: http://kpl.gov.la/EN/Default.aspx

Pathet Lao (Lao: ປະເທດລາວ) is a weekly newspaper published in Laos.

== See also ==
- List of newspapers in Laos
