= Internet in Laos =

The Internet in Laos was first introduced in 1997, with the two commercial ISP services starting in 1999, specifically PlaNet Computers and GlobeNet. These supported a rapid growth of internet cafes across the country to service tourists, which incidentally introduced the internet to many English speaking Lao nationals. The introduction of mobile broadband has significantly increased the use of the Internet in Laos since 2008.

== Status ==
- Internet users: 707,871 users, 125th in the world; 10.7% of the population, 169th in the world (2012).
- Fixed broadband: 96,291 subscribers, 101st in the world; 1.5% of the population, 134th in the world (2012).
- Mobile broadband: 50,648 subscribers, 124th in the world; 0.8% of the population, 134th in the world (2012).
- Facebook: 150,000 subscribers (2012).
- Internet hosts: 1,532, 166th in the world (2012).
- IPv4: 54,784 addresses allocated, 0% of the worldwide total, 8.3 addresses per 1000 people (2012).
- Top level domain: .la

On 4 July 2013, The Lao Ministry of Post and Telecommunication's National Internet Center announced that it had launched the Lao Computer Emergency Response Team (LaoCERT), a branch of government focused on battling cyber crime.

== Local operators ==
In 2008 two operators, Lao Telecom and Unitel, were granted 3G licenses. Another two licenses were issued to ETL and Beeline in 2011. In 2012, the main ways to access Internet in Laos are:

- 3G (up to 21 Mbps HSPA+)
- ADSL (up to 2 Mbps)
- WiMAX (up to 10 Mbps)

4G was introduced in 2015, and a new licensed ISP Lao Champa Internet.

== Censorship and surveillance ==
Laos is included in the OpenNet Initiative (ONI) Regional Overview for Asia (2009). ONI found no evidence of Internet filtering in the political, social, conflict/security, and tools areas based on testing performed in 2011.

The government controls domestic Internet servers and sporadically monitors Internet usage, but by the end of 2012 it apparently did not have the ability to block access to Web sites. Authorities have developed infrastructure to route all Internet traffic through a single gateway, enabling them to monitor and restrict content. However, they apparently had not utilized this increased capability as of the end of 2012. The National Internet Committee under the Prime Minister's Office administers the Internet system. The office requires Internet service providers to submit quarterly reports and link their gateways to facilitate monitoring, but the government's enforcement capability appears limited.

The law generally protects privacy, including that of mail, telephone, and electronic correspondence, but the government reportedly continues to violate these legal protections when there is a perceived security threat. The law prohibits unlawful searches and seizures. While the law requires that police obtain search authorization from a prosecutor or a panel of judges, police do not always obtain prior approval, especially in rural areas. Security laws allow the government to monitor individuals’ movements and private communications, including via cell phones and e-mail.

== See also ==
- Telecommunications in Laos
