= Drug policy of Laos =

In 1994, Laos was the world's third largest producer of opium, primarily in the northern provinces. Narcotics trafficking in Laos is difficult to control because of the remoteness of many border areas, their attendant lack of communications, and the scarcity of resources, all of which make stationing officials at many of the border crossings difficult. Several counternarcotics policy initiatives have been undertaken.

== History ==
During the late 1980s, narcotics control became an important United States concern, because Laos is a major producer of opium and marijuana. In 1987, Laos began to cooperate with the United States in drug control efforts when it requested assistance in providing a viable crop alternative to opium farmers. Increased efforts on counternarcotics cooperation have been evident since January 1990 when a memorandum of understanding on the Bilateral Cooperation of Narcotics Issues was signed. This agreement focused on ways for the United States to provide antinarcotics programs.

The United States provided narcotics-related training to a number of Laotian officials in June 1990 and again in August 1991. And, in 1992, United States Customs Service officials held a training session in Vientiane for Laotian customs officers and other officials. Since then, Laotian officials have also traveled to Australia, Japan, and Europe for counternarcotics cooperation training.

In late 1992, as part of the continuing counternarcotics effort, the LPDR Customs Department set up an anti-smuggling unit in Vientiane. The Council of Ministers approved the formation of this counternarcotics police unit operationally under the Ministry of Interior but with policy controlled by the Lao National Committee on Drug Control and Supervision. Progress in the configuration of the unit was negligible. As of mid-1993, however, the United States was working with the LPDR to provide support and training for the unit, and the site for the unit was being renovated.

Estimated opium production has declined annually since 1989, largely through successful crop reduction and replacement programs that target specific areas and are funded and initiated by the United States and the UN Drug Control Program. Laos has facilitated these crop substitution programs aimed at developing alternative crops and occupations in Houaphan, Vientiane, and Xiangkhoang provinces.

In 1989, there were an estimated 42,130 hectares of land deemed "potentially harvestable" for cultivating opium. By 1993 there were approximately 26,040 hectares. The potential opium yield declined from 380 tons in 1989 to 230 tons in 1992 and to 180 tons in 1993. The United States government estimated that opium production in Laos had declined some 27 percent in 1990 over the previous year, approximately 13 percent from 1991 to 1992, and about 22 percent from 1992 to 1993, the latter mainly as a result of adverse weather because the estimated hectarage under cultivation did not decrease.

Decreased opium cultivation and production are also the result of increased law enforcement efforts, narcotics-related arrests and crop seizures, and a greater effort to disseminate information on the disadvantages of drug trafficking. Although the government tends to deny that it has a domestic drug problem, a public awareness program stressing the dangers of drug use and trafficking has been established, and, as part of the information and education campaign, there has been increased publicity on penalties for offenses.

In April 1993, Laos was certified for narcotics cooperation in 1992 by the United States Department of State. Certification is granted for performance in narcotics cooperation in the previous calendar year and is categorized by cooperation or certification, noncooperation or decertification, and national interest waiver. Certification guarantees Laos increased United States cooperation and funding of counternarcotics programs.

Certification (with explanation) stipulates that in order to receive full United States support, Laos has to take visible, significant, and continuing action to improve the enforcement of antinarcotics laws, which were first enacted in November 1989. Other reasons for the designation certification with explanation include the slow pace of cooperation with officials from the United States Drug Enforcement Administration and allegations of involvement in drug trafficking by high-level members of the government.

In April 1994, the United States granted Laos a national interest waiver for certification of narcotics cooperation in 1993. It was determined that the waiver was preferable to decertification or certification and was in the United States's national interest in order to exact continued cooperation on the Vietnam War POW/MIA issue.

Previous efforts, although modest, to curb the drug trade continue. At the same time, however, corruption among civilian and military personnel and their collusion in narcotics activities reportedly continue as well. In 1993 the prime minister ordered the provinces to organize antidrug committees and cooperate with the Lao National Committee on Drug Control and Supervision. Cooperation is to take the form of publicizing existing laws and regulations and educating the public on the dangers of drugs.

== Crown Prince Sopsaisana's opium bust ==
The Laotian prince Sopsaisana was the head of the Asian Peoples Anti-Communist League, the chief political advisor of Vang Pao, Vice President of the Laotian National Assembly and military commander of the CIA controlled Laotian Hmong army. In April 1971 Prince Sopsaisana, then Laos's new Ambassador to France, arrived in Paris.

After a tip-off, customs at Orly airport intercepted a valise containing 123 pounds of pure heroin, then the largest drug seizure in French history with an estimated value of $13.5 million. The Prince had planned to ship the drugs to New York. CIA stationed in Paris convinced the French to cover up the affair; Prince Sopsaisana returned to Vientiane two weeks later.

== See also ==
- Crime in Laos
- Golden Triangle
- CIA drug trafficking allegations
