= Lao Brewery Company =

Laotian drink company

Lao Brewery Company Ltd
- Industry: Alcoholic beverage
- Predecessor: Brasseries et Glacières du Laos
- Founded: 1971; 55 years ago
- Headquarters: Vientiane, Laos
- Products: Beer
- Brands: Beerlao, LaneXang Lager Beer, Tigerhead Drinking Water, Soda Lao
- Owner: Lao government Carlsberg Group
- Website: Official website

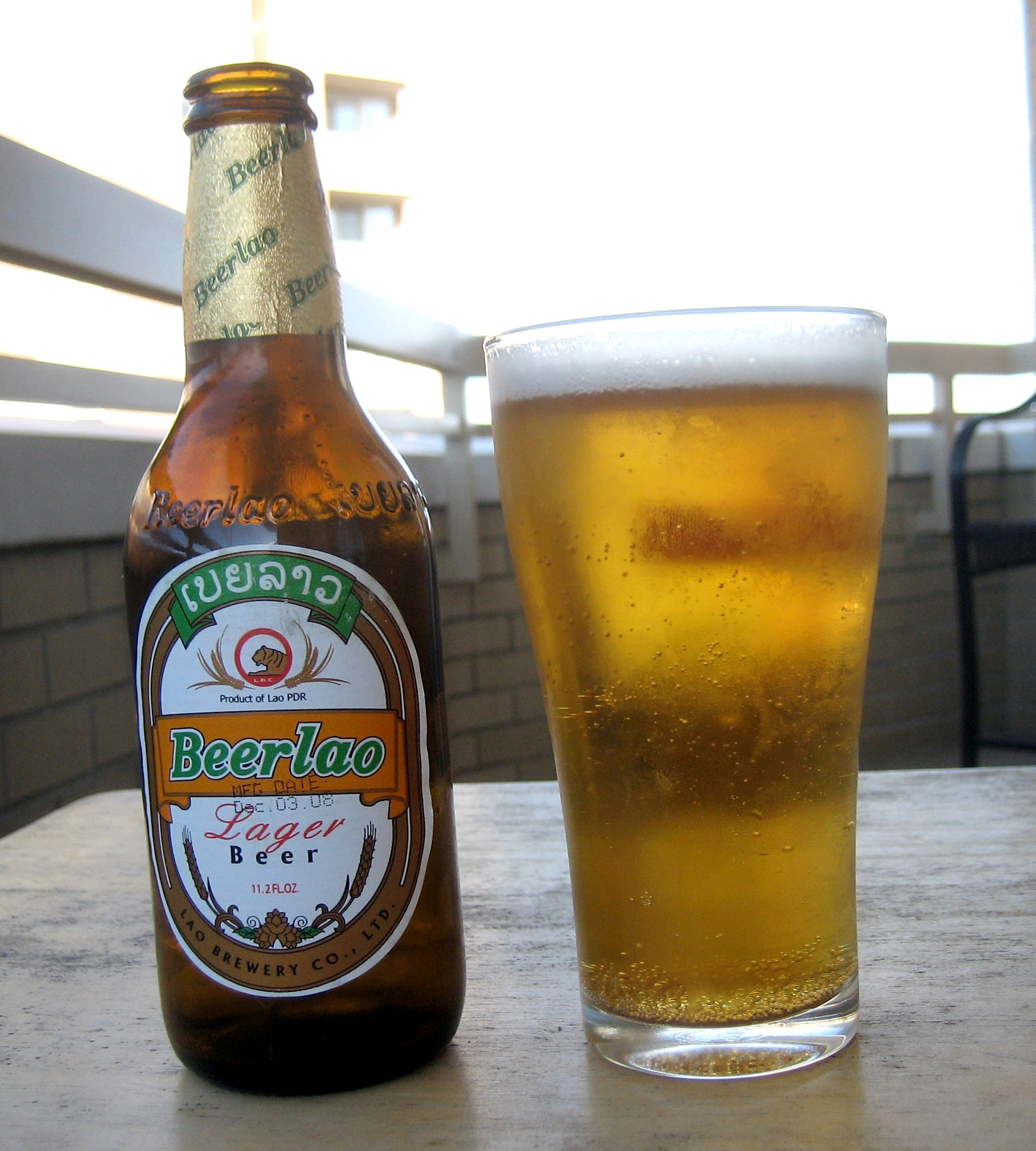
A bottle of Beerlao Lager.

The Lao Brewery Company Ltd. (LBC) (Lao: ບໍລິສັດ ເບຍລາວ ຈໍາກັດ Bolisad Beerlao Chamkad) is a producer of beer, soft drinks, and bottled drinking water in Laos. It is headquartered in Vientiane.

== History ==
Founded in 1971, the Lao Brewery Company was at that time a joint-venture between French and Lao businessmen. It took up production in 1973 with a capacity of 3 million litres per year. The company, then called Brasseries et Glacières du Laos (BGL), marketed Bière Larue for the local market and "33" export for export (to countries in Indochina).

With the establishment of the Democratic People's Republic of Laos in 1975, the company was nationalised and obtained the status of a state-owned enterprise. It marketed its beer first under the Bière Lao brand, then (early 1995) as Beerlao. Their brand "33" export was marketed until 1990, and Bière Larue until 1995.

In the wake of the 1986 economic reform program, which initiated a transition from central planning to a market economy and the launching of the New Economic Mechanism (NEM), the LBC in 1993 entered into a joint venture: 49% Lao government-owned with 51% foreign investment (Loxley: 25.5% and Italian: 25.5%) with a production capacity of 20 million litres per year and employing 300 workers.

In 2005 there was a change in ownership, when Carlsberg Group acquired 50% of the company, while the Lao government kept 50%.

In 2007 Carlsberg Group acquired 70% of the shares in Lao Soft Drink Co Ltd., with the Lao government keeping the remaining shares.

All machinery is imported from Europe. The company processes locally grown rice and imports malted barley from France and Belgium, and hops and yeast from Germany.

== Products ==
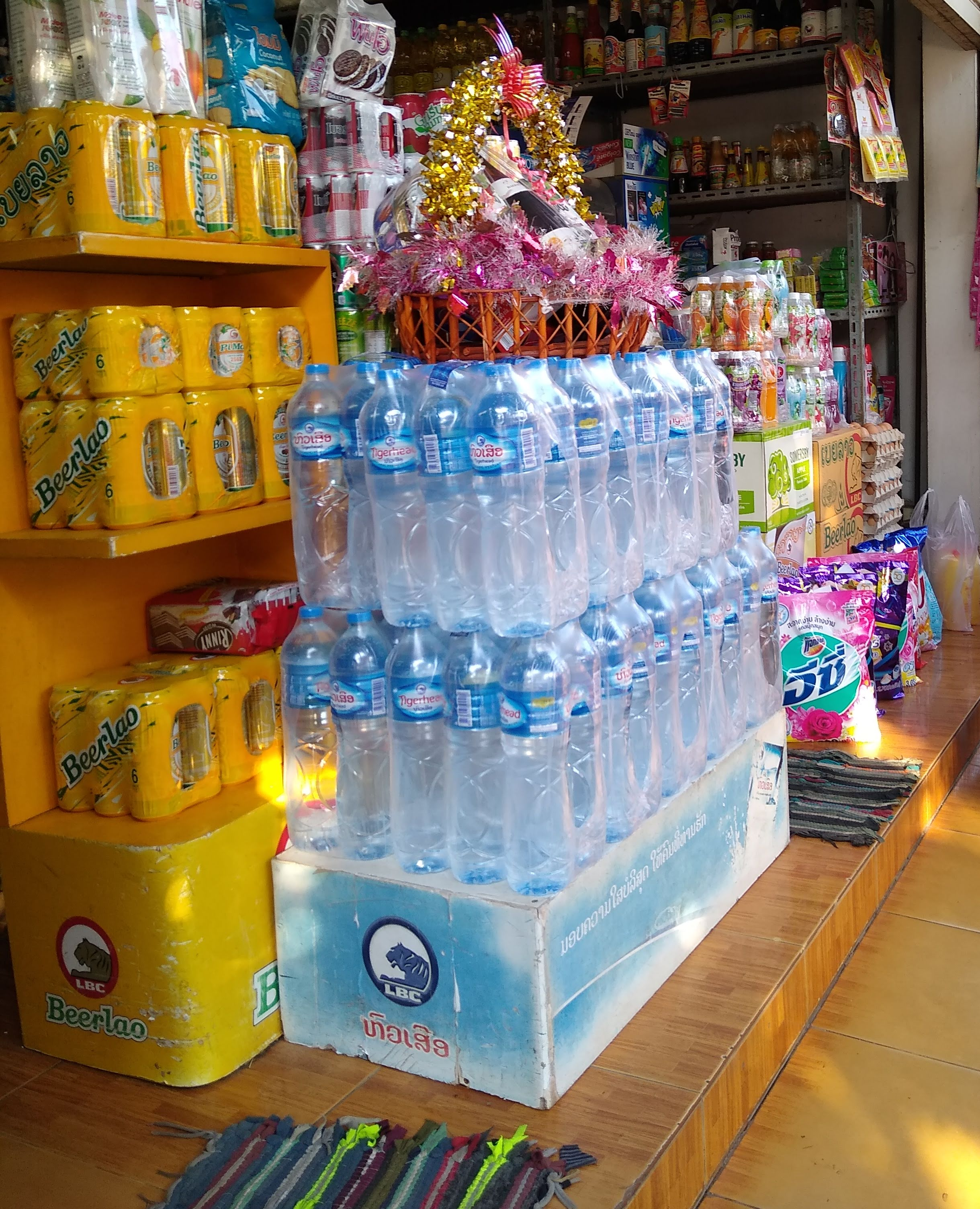
Tigerhead and Beerlao for sale in Vientiane

The company produces and markets seven types of beer under the Beerlao brand (Beerlao Lager, Beerlao Gold, Beerlao Dark, Beerlao White, Beerlao Luang Prabang, Beerlao IPA, and Beerlao Green) in addition to Lanexang lager. It also produces and markets bottled drinking water under the Tigerhead brand, and also produce all Pepsico products in Laos, such as Pepsi and 7Up.

LBC claims it has a 99% local beer market share.
