= Ministry of Justice (Laos) =

Government ministry of Laos

The Ministry of Justice of Laos existed as far back as the Royal Lao Government (1940s). It was not until the first Laos government in 1975 that the ministry took a more active role in the creation and operation of the judiciary, court system, and the rights and freedoms of Laotian citizens. Additionally, the Prime Minister might guide the Ministry of Justice's role in regards to the legislative branch, the dissemination of law, and the promotion of legal education (e.g., law schools).

== List of ministers ==
=== First Coalition Government ===
- Thongdi Sounthonvichit (1957)
- Thao Leaum Insisiengmay (1958)

=== Government of Phuy Xananikôn ===
- Ngon Sananikone (1959–1960)

=== Second Coalition Government ===
- Inpeng Suryadhay (1964–1971)
- Souvanna Phouma (1972–1973)

=== Lao People's Democratic Republic ===
- Khamking Souvanlasy (1974–1975)
- Kou Souvannemethi (1976–1992)
- Kham Ouane Boupha (1992–2005)
- Chaleuan Yapaoher (2006–2016)
- Xaysi Santivong (2016–2021)
- Phaivy Siboualipha (2021–2026)
- Khamphan Phommathat (2026–present)

== See also ==
- Justice ministry
- Politics of Laos
