= People's Supreme Court (Laos) =

Supreme judicial organ of the Lao People's Democratic Republic

The People's Supreme Court of the Lao People's Democratic Republic is the supreme judicial organ of Laos. It was established in 1982. As outlined in Article 92 of Constitution, the People's Supreme Court of the Lao People's Democratic Republic is the highest judicial body and "examines the judgments and judgments of the people's courts and military courts". There has been indications that women have served on the provincial courts. For instance, in 2018, it was announced that Napaporn Phong Thai was appointed as the President of Court Zone 2, Xayaburi Province.

Per Article 93, the President, Vice President and the judges are appointed, transferred or removed by the Standing Committee of the National Assembly. Although the Standing Committee has decisive authority, the same article does state that President does have some power regarding the appointment, transferal or removal of the Vice President.

In 1983, Oun Nue Phimmasone became the first President of the People's Supreme Court. Currently, the President is Phaivy Siboualipha.
