= Telephone numbers in Laos =

- Country: Laos
- Continent: Asia
- Numbering plan type: '1234567890'
- Format: 'number and character'
- Country code: +856
- International access: 00
- Long-distance: 0

== Examples ==
- Calling within Vientiane with landline to number 0111-123456 dial: 123456
- Calling to Vientiane to Champasak number 0221-123456 dial: 041-123456 (with extra fee for calling to other provinces)
- Calling to Vientiane landline from mobile phone to number 021-123456 dial: 021-123456
- Calling to mobile phones by any types of phone to number 0020-12345678 dial: 020-12345678
- Calling from any countries to Laos number 021-123456 dial: +856-21-123456
- CallingLaos to United States number 1-222-333-4444 dial: 00-1-222-333-11111

== Area code ==
Code	Administrative division
020	Mobile SIM (All carrier and all region Laos)
021	Vientiane Prefecture
023	Vientiane & Xaisomboun
030	Prepaid Wireless Portable Phone (Lao: ໂທລະສັບຕັ້ງໂຕະບໍ່ມີສາຍແບບເຕີມເງິນ) (All carrier and all region Laos)
031	Champasak
034	Salavan
036	Attapeu
038	Sekong
041	Savannakhet
051	Khammouan
054	Bolikhamsai
061	Xiengkhouang
064	Houaphanh
071	Louang Prabang
074	Sainhabouli
081	Oudomxay
084	Bokeo
086	Louang Namtha
088	Phongsali

== Long-distance ==
Starting January 1, 2012, fixed lines will be allowed to dial directly to other provinces/countries, but still using open dialing plan. To dial to other province, dial area code+phone number (0xx-xxxxxx), and to dial to other countries, dial 00+country code+phone number.

Before 2012, dialing to other provinces is 101, then wait for operator, the same thing as to other countries, but to other countries is 100. Before 2012, mobile phones are already allowed to dial to other provinces/countries directly.

== See also ==
- Telecommunications in Laos
