= Mass media in Laos =

Party-controlled information system

Mass media in Laos is based on a network of telephone lines, radiotelephone communications, and mobile phone infrastructure.

After the Lao People's Revolutionary Party seized power in 1975, independent newspapers, radio stations, and printing presses were either closed or brought under party control. The 2008 Media Law of Laos affirms the role of the media as the voice of the party. The lead media organization is Khaosan Pathet Lao (Lao News Agency), whose lead all other news sources are expected to follow.

== Infrastructure and statistics ==
In 1997, there were 25,000 telephone lines in use, and in 2007 there were 850,000 mobile cellular subscribers. Laos was served by a Russian Intersputnik satellite. In 2015, Laos launched its own communications satellite, LaoSat 1, jointly owned by the Laotian government and the China Asia-Pacific Mobile Telecommunications Satellite Company.

In 1998, there were 12 AM stations and 1 FM station. In 1997 there were an estimated 730,000 radios in the country. In 2011 Laos had 3 television channels. In 2000, there was 1 Internet service provider, by 2002 serving about 10,000 users. The top-level domain for Laos is .la.

== Television and radio ==
List of television and radio stations:

=== Television stations ===
- Lao National Television
- Lao Star TV
- Lao Public Security Television
- MVLao TV
- VTE9 (Vientiane Capital Television)

=== Radio stations ===
- CRI Vientiane
- Lao National Radio
- Lao Security Radio

== See also ==
- Internet in Laos
- Telephone numbers in Laos
- Freedom of the press in Laos
