= Le Rénovateur =

French language newspaper in Laos

- Type: Weekly newspaper
- Format: Print, online
- Owner: Lao Press in Foreign Languages
- Founded: 1998
- Political alignment: Pro-government
- Language: French
- Website: http://www.lerenovateur.la/

Le Rénovateur is the only French-language newspaper in the Lao PDR (Laos). It is published weekly by the Lao Press in Foreign Languages, which is a specialised agency of the Ministry of Information and Culture

It was started in 1998 after the communist government decided to start a new policy in order to open the country. It was helped in the beginning by the Agence intergouvernementale de la Francophonie, an international organisation that promotes the French language, especially in Africa and in South-East Asia. Its first editor-in-chief was Douangta Manokoun, with the support of a French advisor, Michel Leroy. Since the newspaper's 200th edition, FrancoNet Canada has helped it to publish on-line. The French Cultural Center of Vientiane pays someone to correct the articles written by Laotian journalists.

Le Rénovateur is sometimes described as a propaganda newspaper by the opposition living abroad. In 2003, Le Rénovateur published an interview with Mr Phivath, the lawyer of Thierry Falise and Vincent Reynaud, European journalists arrested because they were investigating reports of the war between the Laotian Army and the country's Hmong tribespeople in the jungle of Saysomboun special zone. The interviews were censored, but received the Prix de la libre expression (Free-Speech Prize), given by the Union de la Presse Francophone.

Also in 2003, Le Rénovateur published stories about working in garment sweat shops, film censorship at the beginning of the socialist revolution, and the difficulties of being gay in Vientiane.

Created by Soumsanouk Mixay, the newspaper was taken over Savankhone Razmountry in 2003.

== See also ==
- List of newspapers in Laos
