= Phaivy Siboualipha =

Laotian politician and judge

- ໄພວີ ສີບົວລິພາ

President of the People's Supreme Court of Laos
- Incumbent
- Assumed office 23 March 2026
- Preceded by: Viengthong Siphandone

Minister of Justice
- In office 22 March 2021 – March 2026
- Preceded by: Xaysi Santivong
- Succeeded by: Khamphan Phommathat

Personal details
- Party: Lao People's Revolutionary Party

Phaivy Siboualipha (Lao: ໄພວີ ສີບົວລິພາ), also rendered Phayvy Sibualipha, is a Laotian politician and judge who has served as President of the People's Supreme Court of Laos since March 2026. He previously served as Minister of Justice from 2021 to 2026.

== Career ==
Siboualipha was appointed Minister of Justice in the government elected by the first session of the 9th National Assembly on 22 March 2021.

As Minister of Justice, he represented Laos in bilateral and regional legal cooperation. In December 2024, he co-chaired the sixth expanded judicial conference of Vietnamese and Lao border provinces in Vientiane with Vietnamese Minister of Justice Nguyễn Hải Ninh.

In March 2026, Khamphan Phommathat was appointed Minister of Justice, while Siboualipha was transferred to a new position at the People's Supreme Court of Laos.

Siboualipha was appointed President of the People's Supreme Court during the inaugural session of the 10th National Assembly of Laos, pursuant to Resolution No. 08/NA, dated 23 March 2026. In that role, he presented the court system's 2026–2030 judicial reform priorities to the National Assembly, including measures intended to strengthen the rule of law, improve court efficiency, and expand access to justice.

In May 2026, he chaired the first inaugural meeting of the Judges' Council of the People's Supreme Court. The Lao News Agency described him as a member of the Party Central Committee and President of the People's Supreme Court.
