= Beerlao =

Beers by the Lao Brewery Company, in Laos

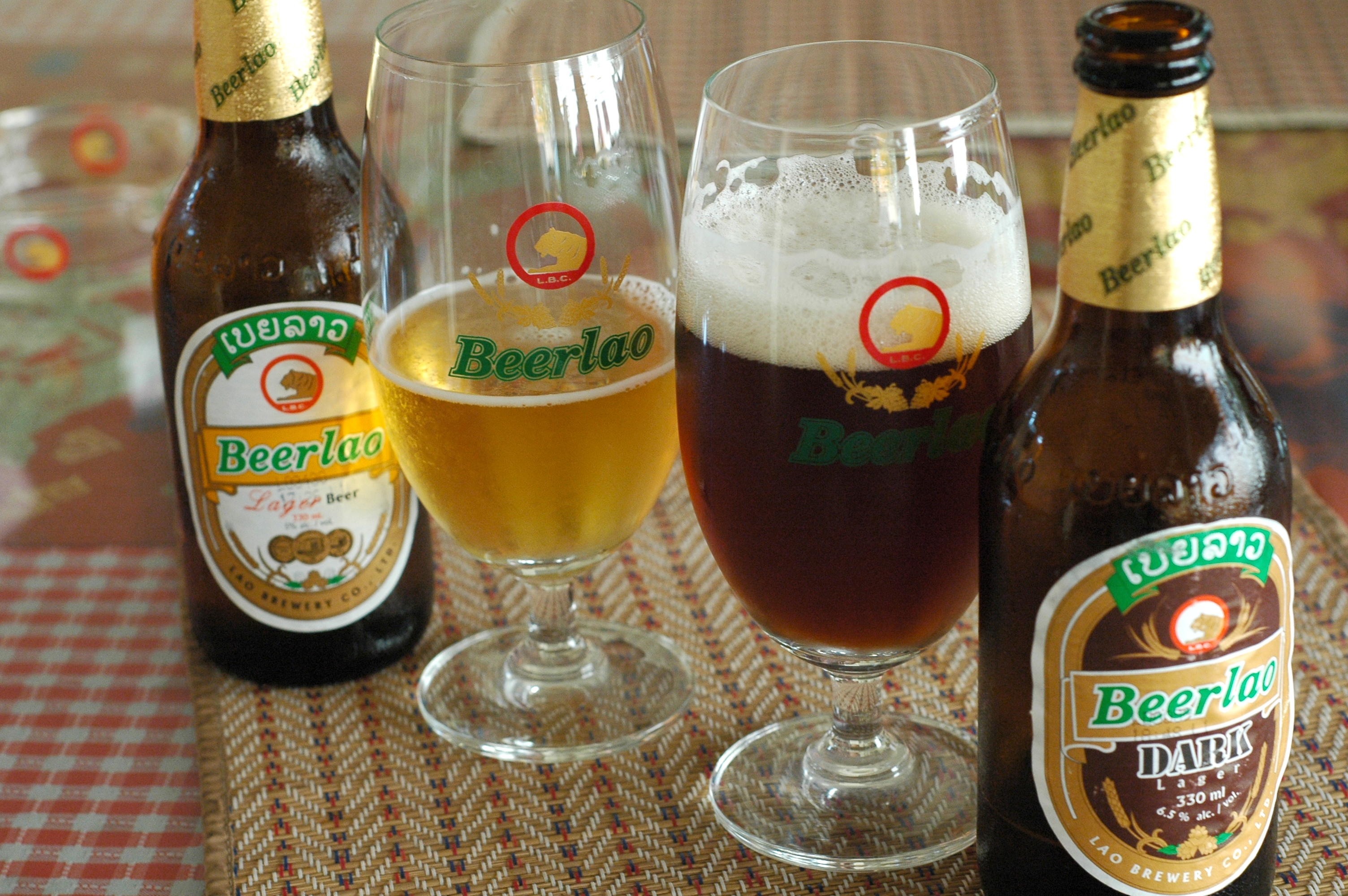
Lager (left) and dark (right) Beerlao

Beerlao (Lao: ເບຍລາວ) is the generic name of a range of beers produced by the Lao Brewery Company (LBC) of Vientiane, Laos. A symbol of Lao identity, The Economist has described Beerlao as being "everywhere in Laos" and "probably the most important lager in the world".

== History ==
The beer is based on locally grown jasmine rice; the malt used is imported from France and Belgium, the hops and yeast imported from Germany.

Beerlao Original (5% Alc./Vol.), the original lager produced by LBC, is sold in 330 mL and 640 mL (1 1/8 imperial pints) bottles and 330 mL cans. It is available throughout Laos, and in Western-style restaurants in Cambodia. It is increasingly available in bars in Thailand. As of 2013, restaurants in Laos charge upwards of a base price of 40,000 kip for a 640 mL bottle, which is a little less than US$2.00. In some places, the beer is available in draft form (on tap). This is referred to as bia sot ("fresh beer") by locals.

In 2005, LBC launched a locally produced Carlsberg beer and two new Beerlao products: Beerlao Light with a lower alcohol content (2.9%), and Beerlao Dark with an alcohol content of 6.5%. These both come in 330 mL bottles. Beerlao Light has been discontinued.

In April 2008, LBC launched another beer brand, a 5% alcohol lager called Lanexang. "Lanexang" means "Million Elephants" and was the name of a historic Lao kingdom, 1354–1707. Since its launch, Lanexang Beer has been continuously gaining popularity among local drinkers though it is relatively hard to find.

A new beer, Beerlao Gold, was introduced in 2010. Its distinguishing ingredient is "khao kai noy" rice, which is claimed to give the beer a "good scent and non-sticky texture."

In 2018 and 2019, LBC launched two new beer types; Beerlao White, a white lager, and Beerlao IPA.

The company claimed to have a 99% market share of the beer market in Laos in 2008, though this may have been eroded by the arrival of Singapore's Tiger beer on the market.

Beerlao was an official sponsor of the 2009 Southeast Asian Games held 9–18 December 2009 in Vientiane as well as most sports events in the country. They are one of the main marketers in the country and issues one of its most popular calendars, showcasing the year's winners of the Beerlao beauty pageant.

Beerlao has been awarded twice with a gold quality award (in 2006 and 2010) and once with a silver quality award (in 2003), granted by Monde Selection, the first International Quality Institute founded in Belgium.

== Export ==
Beerlao is now exported to the United Kingdom, the United States, Canada, Australia, New Zealand, South Korea, Ireland, Japan, Vietnam, Cambodia, France, Thailand, Denmark, Hong Kong and Macau, Switzerland, mainland China, Singapore, and the Netherlands. It is available duty-free at most Lao border crossings, especially those with Thailand, where it is usually priced in Thai baht (from 20 baht per can, as of 2006).

In October 2024, the Lao Brewery Company (LBC) exported more than 10 million litres of its iconic Beerlao across the globe, generating over US$10 million in export revenues.

== See also ==
- Lao-lao
