= Vientiane Times =

English and Lao language daily newspaper

- Type: Daily newspaper
- Format: Print, online
- Owner: Lao Press in Foreign Languages
- Founded: 7 April 1994
- Political alignment: Pro-government
- Language: English, Lao
- Headquarters: Vientiane, Laos
- Website: www.vientianetimes.org.la

The Vientiane Times is a bilingual English and Lao newspaper, published daily in Vientiane, Laos. Established in 1994 as a weekly, the paper was started by an agency, Lao Press in Foreign Languages, under the Ministry of Information and Culture. It went to twice per week in 1996 and daily in 2004.

== See also ==
- List of newspapers in Laos
