= Vientiane Mai =

Lao language weekly newspaper published in Vientiane, Laos by the Lao government

- Type: Weekly newspaper
- Political alignment: Far-left
- Language: Lao
- Headquarters: Vientiane, Laos
- Website: www.vientianemai.net

Vientiane Mai (Lao: ວຽງຈັນໃໝ່, romanized: Viengchanmay, lit. 'New Vientiane') is a Lao language weekly newspaper published by the Government of Laos in the capital and largest city of Vientiane. It was originally called the Vientiane Post, but was renamed in 1975 when the Lao People's Revolutionary Party (LPRP) took power. It reflects the position of the government and the LPRP.
