= Law of Laos =

The major source of the law of Laos is legislation; it is a civil code jurisdiction. There are 2 types of legislation: legislation of general application and legislation of specific application.

== History ==
Laos inherited its civil legal system from the French colonial administrators. The original civil codes included Lao customary law.

== Issues ==
=== Civil liberties and human rights ===
Dissent is sometimes handled by suppressing civil rights. The constitution provisions of the 1990s cover freedom of worship, expression and press. A penal code and a constitution which guarantee civil liberties have been proposed. Implementation is another matter, particularly in the area of freedom of political expression. The media is state-controlled.

There is a system for prosecuting criminal behavior. Common crimes are evaluated at the local village level. More serious cases, especially politically sensitive ones, are referred to higher authorities. Tribunals operate at district and provincial levels with judges appointed by the government.

In 1988, a Laotian journalist protested that open criticism of the government was forbidden and 1 of his friends was imprisoned after he complained about the continuing lack of a constitution. The same year, Western diplomats reported that hundreds or thousands of individuals were being held in detention centers in Laos and that citizens were being arrested and held for months without being charged.

In the 1980s and 1990s, the government instituted the New Economic Mechanism, a series of economic reforms geared toward establishing a market-oriented economy. Along with these economic reforms came an opening to the West, which provided some opportunity for scrutiny of human rights violations. Travel by diplomats and foreign aid workers is restricted. Domestic and foreign travel by Laotians is subject to scrutiny and restriction.

=== Criminal justice system ===
The Ministry of Interior is the main instrument of state control and guardianship over the criminal justice system. Ministry of Interior police monitor Laotians and foreign nationals who live in Laos; there is a system of informants in workplace committees and in residential areas. According to the United States Department of State's Country Reports on Human Rights Practices for 1993, the party and state monitor aspects of family and social life through neighborhood and workplace committees. These committees are responsible for maintaining public order and reporting "bad elements" to the police, and carrying out political training and disciplining employees.

Trials are not held in public, while trial verdicts are publicly announced. While there is some provision for appeal, it does not apply to important political cases. Under the constitution, judges and prosecutors are supposed to be independent with their decisions free from outside scrutiny. In practice, the courts appear to accept recommendations of other government agencies, especially the Ministry of Interior, in making their decisions. Theoretically, the government provides legal counsel to the accused. In practice, defendants represent themselves without outside counsel.

In 1992 the government launched a campaign to publicize the latter. The leadership claims efforts at developing a legal system with a codified body of laws and a penal code. As of 1994, the legal codes had not been implemented with individuals being held without being informed of charges or their accusers' identities.

== Detention centers ==
In Laos, there are 4 categories of persons held in confinement by the State. Aside from common criminals, there are political, social, and ideological dissidents. These are people who the government feels are a threat to their control, most commonly because of their public objection to governmental policies or actions.

Laos established 4 different types of detention centers: prisons, reeducation centers or seminar camps, rehabilitation camps, and remolding centers. Social deviants or common criminals were considered less threatening to the regime than persons accused of political crimes, who were considered potential counterrevolutionaries; social deviants were confined in rehabilitation camps. According to MacAlister Brown and Joseph J. Zasloff, prisons were primarily reserved for common criminals, and political prisoners were held there for usually 6 to 12 months. Ideologically suspect persons were sent to remolding centers. Reeducation centers were for those deemed politically risky, including former RLG officials. Political prisoners sometimes served 3- to 5-year terms or longer.

In 1986, Brown and Zasloff reported that prisoners were not tried and were incarcerated by administrative fiat. Former inmates said that they were arrested, informed by the security officials that they had been charged with crimes, and then sent off to camps for indeterminate periods. Typically, prisoners were told 1 day prior to their release to prepare for departure.

In 1984, Vientiane declared that all reeducation centers had been closed. At that time, Amnesty International estimated that 6,000 to 7,000 political prisoners were held in these centers. The government acknowledged that there were some former inmates in remote areas and claimed that their confinement was voluntary. In the 1980s, the government closed some of the reeducation centers and released most of the detainees.

In 1989, Laos took steps to reduce the number of political prisoners, some of whom had been held since 1975. Some hundred detainees, including officials and officers from the former United States-backed RLG and Royal Lao Army, were released from reeducation centers in the northeastern province of Houaphan. Released prisoners reported that hundreds of individuals remained in custody in as many as 8 camps, including at least 6 generals and former high-ranking members of the RLG. These individuals reportedly performed manual labor such as log cutting, repairing roads, and building irrigation systems. In 1993, Amnesty International reported human rights violations in the continued detention of 3 "prisoners of conscience" detained since 1975 and not sentenced until 1992, and those held under restrictions or, according to international standards, the subjects of unfair trials.

As of 1993, reports indicated that some officials of the RLG and military remained in state custody. Those accused of hostility toward the government were subject to arrest and confinement. Prisoners were sometimes denied family visitation and some form of medical care.

== See also ==
- Human rights in Laos
