= .la =

Internet country-code top level domain for Laos

- Introduced: 14 May 1996
- TLD type: Country code top-level domain
- Status: Active
- Registry: LA Names Corporation
- Sponsor: Lao National Internet Committee
- Intended use: Entities connected with Laos
- Actual use: Marketed as a domain for Los Angeles; popular in Latin America and Laos; used by Toki Pona websites; sometimes used for domain hacks.
- Registration restrictions: None; some names are reserved as "premium names" at extra cost
- Structure: Registrations are taken directly at the second level
- Documents: ICANN .la MoU; Policies
- Dispute policies: UDRP
- DNSSEC: Yes
- Registry website: lanic.gov.la

.la is the Internet country code top-level domain (ccTLD) for Laos.

Although the .la domain is officially assigned to the country of Laos, subdomains have been delegated to some organizations outside Laos.

== History ==
The LA Names Corporation, based in Guernsey, has gained the rights to market .la registrations, and they had used the registry services of Afilias and, formerly, the registrar services of DreamHost. However, DreamHost has discontinued .la registrar services as of May 2006. LA Names and CentralNic, Ltd. completed the transfer of the .la domain name to the CentralNic system in 2007. Cabel Sasser of Panic created "Poopla" (xn--ls8h.la), "The World's First Emoji Domain" on April 13, 2011. A company based in Hong Kong by the name of Sterling Holdings originally purchased the TLD from Laos, and marketed it towards users in Louisiana and Los Angeles.

== Popular use ==
The domain is used by organizations in the state of Louisiana (whose postal abbreviation is LA) and the city of Los Angeles. No official or unofficial association exists between the .la domain and any government in the United States. Technically, Louisiana and Los Angeles are assigned .la.us and .la.ca.us, respectively, under the .us locality namespace. The .la ccTLD also sees limited use for businesses in Latin America, such as Intel's site for the region.

The .la domain is also used for domain hacks in the French language and the Chinese language. là means "there" in French and in Italian, and in other Romance languages; "啦" (pinyin: la) is a common modal word at the end of a sentence or a phrase in Mandarin Chinese and Cantonese.

Mozilla Foundation's URL shortener uses it with the "mzl.la" domain hack.

Tesla Motors uses "ts.la" domain hack as a shortener and a redirect.

Digikala, an e-commerce startup in Iran and the Middle East uses the "dgka.la" domain hack as a shortener.

The Network information center of .la is oriented to pages based in Los Angeles.

The Digital Public Library of America uses dp.la.

In Toki Pona, the word la is used as a context marker. Therefore, many popular Toki Pona websites use the ".la" domain, such as sona pona, an English wiki about Toki Pona, and lipu Linku, a Toki Pona dictionary.

== Lao language domain ==
.ລາວ
- Introduced: 10 June 2019; 7 years ago
- Sponsor: Lao National Internet Center (LANIC)
- Intended use: Entities connected with Laos which use the Lao script
- DNS name: xn--q7ce6a

In 2008 a preliminary application was made to open the internationalized top level domain .ລາວ (the name of Laos in the Lao language). In 2019 this top level domain was approved. Web sites will come at a later stage. It is intended for usage with domain names in Lao script.
