= Laos =

Country in Southeast Asia

Lao People's Democratic Republic ສາທາລະນະລັດ ປະຊາທິປະໄຕ ປະຊາຊົນລາວ Sathalanalat Paxathipatai Paxaxon Lao
- Flag Emblem
- Motto: ສັນຕິພາບ ເອກະລາດ ປະຊາທິປະໄຕ ເອກະພາບ ວັດທະນະຖາວອນ; Santiphap, Ekalat, Paxathipatai, Ekaphap, Vatthanathavon "Peace, Independence, Democracy, Unity and Prosperity"
- Anthem: ເພງຊາດລາວ; Pheng Xat Lao "Lao National Anthem"
- Location of Laos (green)
- Capital and largest city: Vientiane; 17°58′N 102°36′E
- Official languages: Lao
- Spoken languages: Lao; Khmu; Hmong; Phu Thai; Tai
- Ethnic groups (2025): 54.8% Lao; 11.2% Hmong; 10.9% Khmu; 2.6% Phu Thai; 2.1% Tai; 1.9% Akha; 1.9% Lue; 1.7% Makong; 1.6% Katang; 11.3% other
- Religion: 66.0% Buddhism (Note: "The State respects and protects all lawful activities of Buddhists and of followers of other religions, [and] mobilises and encourages Buddhist monks and novices as well as the priests of other religions to participate in activities that are beneficial to the country and people."); 30.7% Tai folk religion; 1.5% Christianity; 1.8% other/none
- Demonym: Laotian
- Government: Communist state
  - General Secretary and President: Thongloun Sisoulith
  - Vice President: Viengthong Siphandone
  - Prime Minister: Saleumxay Kommasith
  - President of the National Assembly: Sonexay Siphandone
  - Chief Justice: Phaivy Siboualipha
- Legislature: National Assembly

Formation
  - Kingdom of Lan Xang: 1353–1707
  - Kingdoms of Luang Prabang, Vientiane and Champasak: 1707–1778
  - Vassals of Siam: 1778–1893
  - French protectorate: 1893–1953
  - Unified kingdom: 11 May 1947
  - Independence from France: 22 October 1953
  - Communist state established: 2 December 1975

Area
  - Total: 236,800 km^{2} (91,400 sq mi) (82nd)
  - Water (%): 2

Population
  - 2025 estimate: ▲7,241,800
  - 2025 census: 6,744,701
  - Density: 28.48/km^{2} (73.8/sq mi)
- GDP (PPP): 2025 estimate
  - Total: ▲$78.850 billion (108th)
  - Per capita: ▲$10,120 (126th)
- GDP (nominal): 2025 estimate
  - Total: ▲$16.320 billion (138th)
  - Per capita: ▲$2,100 (150th)
- Gini (2024): 34.7 medium inequality
- HDI (2023): ▼0.617 medium (147th)
- Currency: Kip (₭) (LAK)
- Time zone: UTC+7 (ICT)
- Calling code: +856
- ISO 3166 code: LA
- Internet TLD: .la

Laos, (Note: /laʊs/, /ˈlɑːoʊs, ˈlɑːɒs, ˈleɪɒs/ LOWSS, LAH-ohss, LAH-oss, LAY-oss) officially the Lao People's Democratic Republic (LPDR), (Note: Lao: ສາທາລະນະລັດ ປະຊາທິປະໄຕ ປະຊາຊົນລາວ, romanised: Sathalanalat Paxathipatai Paxaxon Lao) is a country in Mainland Southeast Asia; it is the only landlocked country in Southeast Asia. It is bordered by Myanmar and China to the northwest, Vietnam to the east, Cambodia to the southeast, and Thailand to the west and southwest. The 2025 population and housing census enumerated 6,744,701 residents. A post-enumeration survey estimated the true resident population at approximately 7.24 million. Its capital and most populous city is Vientiane. It has three UNESCO World Heritage Sites: the town of Luang Prabang, the temple complex of Vat Phou, and the Plain of Jars. Laos participates in the Greater Mekong Subregion economic cooperation programme and is a member of ASEAN, the Asia-Pacific Trade Agreement, East Asia Summit, La Francophonie, and the World Trade Organization.

The kingdom of Lan Xang existed from the 14th to 18th centuries and was a hub for overland trade through its territory. In 1707 it split into three kingdoms: Luang Prabang, Vientiane, and Champasak. In 1893, these kingdoms were unified under French rule as part of French Indochina. Laos was under Japanese administration during World War II, gaining independence in 1945 before returning to French administration until achieving autonomy in 1949. It regained full independence in 1953 as the Kingdom of Laos, with a constitutional monarchy under Sisavang Vong. A civil war from 1959 to 1975 saw the communist Pathet Lao (supported by China, North Vietnam, and the Soviet Union) oppose the Royal Lao Armed Forces (backed by the United States). It ended with the Lao People's Revolutionary Party's establishment of the Lao People's Democratic Republic in 1975.

== Etymology ==
In the Lao language, the country is colloquially called Muang Lao (ເມືອງລາວ, lit. 'Lao Country') or Pathet Lao (ປະເທດລາວ). The official state name is the Lao People's Democratic Republic (Lao: ສາທາລະນະລັດ ປະຊາທິປະໄຕ ປະຊາຊົນລາວ). In English, the country name is written as Laos, while Lao serves as both the primary demonym and adjective; the term Laotian is also used to refer to citizens or inhabitants of the country. The English name Laos was adopted from French, which historically pluralised the ethnonym with a terminal "s" to refer to the Lao people and their various kingdoms collectively

Traditional Lao historiography presents several explanations for the origin of the word Lao (ລາວ). One theory connects the name to the Pali word lābu, referring to the bottle gourd, a central element in traditional Lao origin myths from which humanity emerged. Another account traces the name to Tai-Lao tribes migrating southwards from Yunnan, originally known as Kao Long (referring to nine dragons or legendary chieftains), which was shortened to Luang and eventually transformed into Lao. A folk etymology suggests that indigenous valley dwellers referred to high-altitude migrants as Dao (ດາວ, 'star') due to their proximity to the sky, a term that later shifted phonetically to Lao.

In modern linguistics, the ethnonym is linked to Chinese Han dynasty records mentioning the Ai Lao (Chinese: 哀牢) confederation. French linguist Michel Ferlus proposed that Lao stems from an Austroasiatic root, *k.raw, denoting "human being" or "person".

== Geography ==
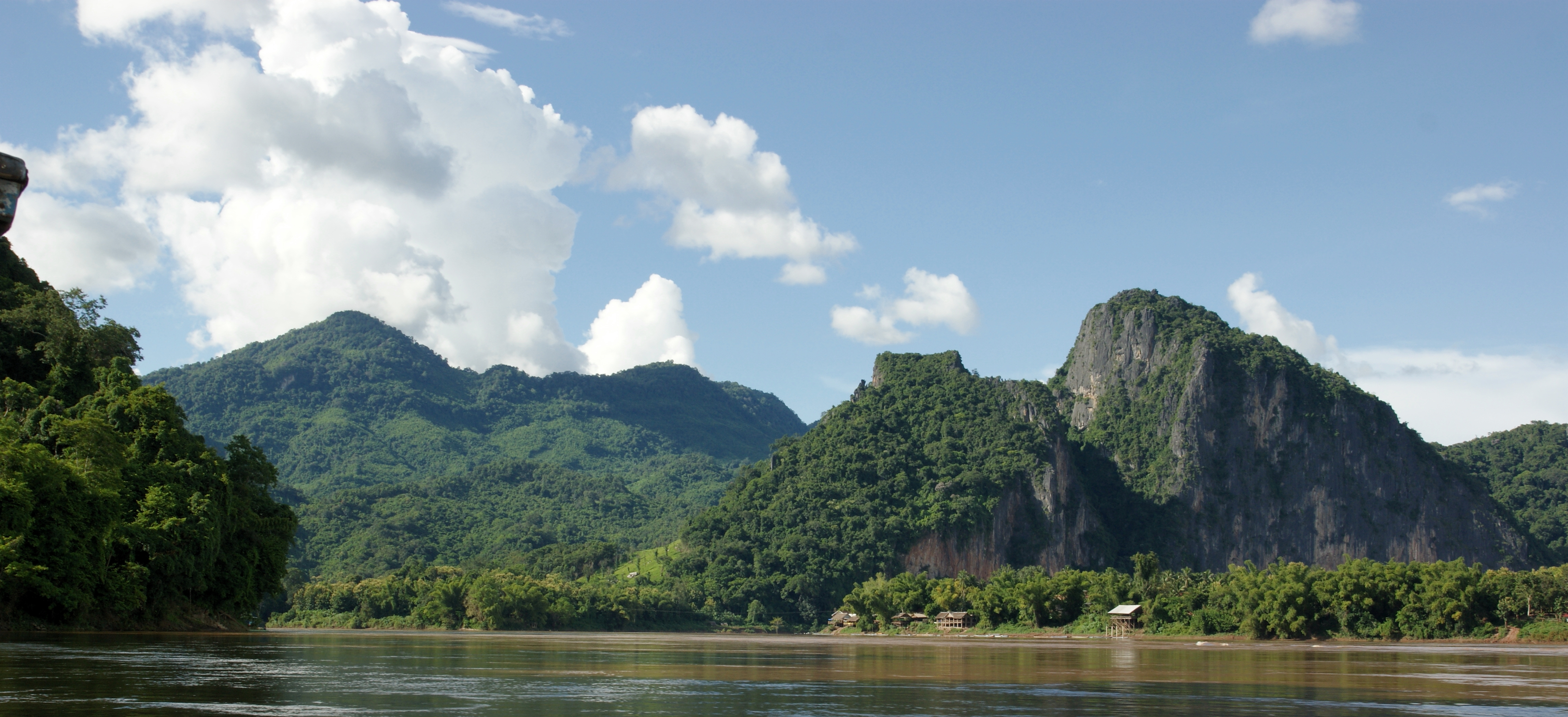
The Mekong flowing through Luang Prabang

Laos is the only landlocked country in Southeast Asia and lies mostly between latitudes 14° and 23°N, and longitudes 100° and 108°E. Its forested landscape consists mostly of mountains, the highest of which is Phou Bia at 2,818 metres (9,245 ft), with some plains and plateaus. The Mekong River forms a part of the western boundary with Thailand, where the mountains of the Annamite Range form most of the eastern border with Vietnam and the Luang Prabang Range the northwestern border with the Thai highlands. There are two major plateaus: the Xiangkhoang in the north and the Bolaven Plateau at the southern end.

In 1993, the government set aside 21% of the land area for habitat conservation preservation. Laos had a 2019 Forest Landscape Integrity Index mean score of 5.59/10, ranking it 98th globally out of 172 countries. It is one of three nations in the opium poppy growing region known as the "Golden Triangle". According to the October 2007 UNODC fact book Opium Poppy Cultivation in South East Asia, the poppy cultivation area was 15 square kilometres (5.8 sq mi), down from 18 square kilometres (6.9 sq mi) in 2006.

=== Climate ===
Köppen climate classification map of Laos

The climate is mostly tropical savanna and influenced by the monsoon pattern. There is a rainy season from May to October, followed by a dry season from November to April. The latter two months of the climatologically defined dry season are hotter than the earlier four months.

=== Wildlife ===
Laos, with its forests and river systems, is home to an array of wildlife. National parks like Nam Et-Phou Louey and Nakai-Nam Theun are refuges, supporting endangered species such as the northern white-cheeked gibbon and the saola. These forests shelter more than 50 mammal species and nearly 300 bird species, along with a variety of reptiles and amphibians. (Note: The Nam Et-Phou Louey National Park harbours over 50 species of mammals, more than 300 species of birds, and various reptiles and amphibians.) Some of the native species are listed as endangered, from Asian elephants to gibbons and tigers; conservation efforts are in place to protect them.

=== Administrative divisions ===
Map of provinces of Laos

Laos is divided into 17 provinces and one prefecture, which includes the capital city Vientiane.

No.	Province	Capital	Area (km^{2})	Population 2005 Census	Population 2015 Census	Population Mid 2023 Estimate
1	Attapeu	Attapeu (Samakkhixay district)	10,320	112,120	139,628	147,000
2	Bokeo	Houayxay (Houayxay district)	6,196	145,263	179,243	213,300
3	Bolikhamsai	Paksan (Paksane District)	14,863	225,301	273,691	330,700
4	Champasak	Pakse (Pakse District)	15,415	607,370	694,023	781,200
5	Houaphanh	Xam Neua (Xamneua District)	16,500	280,938	289,393	317,100
6	Khammouane	Thakhek (Thakhek District)	16,315	337,390	392,052	451,300
7	Luang Namtha	Luang Namtha (Namtha District)	9,325	145,310	175,753	208,900
8	Luang Prabang	Luang Prabang (Luang Prabang district)	16,875	407,039	431,889	477,700
9	Oudomxay	Muang Xay (Xay District)	15,370	265,179	307,622	360,800
10	Phongsaly	Phongsali (Phongsaly District)	16,270	165,447	177,989	197,600
11	Sainyabuli	Sayabouly (Xayabury District)	16,389	338,669	381,376	439,400
12	Salavan	Salavan (Salavan District)	10,691	324,327	396,942	464,800
13	Savannakhet	Savannakhet (Kaysone Phomvihane District)	21,774	825,902	969,697	1,117,500
14	Sekong	Sekong (Lamarm District)	7,665	84,995	113,048	136,700
15	Vientiane Prefecture	Vientiane (Chanthabouly district)	3,920	698,318	820,940	1,009,300
16	Vientiane Province	Phonhong (Phonhong District)	15,610	361,891	419,090	479,400
17	Xiengkhouang	Phonsavan (Pek District)	14,751	229,596	244,684	274,400
18	Xaisomboun	Anouvong (Anouvong district)	8,551	66,427	85,168	116,800
	Totals		236,800	5,621,982	6,492,228^{(a)}	7,545,800

Note: (a) The 2015 Census total was estimated to have an under-enumeration of 2.76%, resulting in a revised 2015 estimate of 6,671,680.

== History ==
=== Prehistory ===
In 2009, an anatomically modern human skull was recovered from Tam Pa Ling Cave in the Annamite Mountains. At least 46,000 years old, the skull was the oldest modern human fossil discovered in Southeast Asia at the time. Stone artifacts, including Hoabinhian types, have also been found at Pleistocene sites in northern Laos.

Archaeological evidence indicates that an agricultural society developed during the 4th millennium BCE, with bronze artifacts appearing around 1500 BCE and iron tools by 700 BCE. The proto-historic period was characterized by contact with Chinese and Indian civilizations. Linguistic and historical evidence indicates that Tai-speaking groups migrated southwest from Guangxi into present-day Laos and Thailand between the 8th and 10th centuries.

=== Lan Xang ===
Prince Fa Ngum founded the kingdom of Lan Xang ("a million elephants") in the 14th century. Leading 10,000 Khmer troops, he conquered several principalities in the Mekong River basin and captured Vientiane. Fa Ngum traced his lineage back to Khun Borom and established Theravada Buddhism as the state religion. In 1373, ministers forced him into exile in Nan due to his ruthlessness, where he later died. His eldest son succeeded him as Samsenethai and reigned for 43 years. Lan Xang became a regional trade hub during Samsenethai's reign, but after his death in 1421, the kingdom fractured into competing factions for nearly a century.

In 1520, Photisarath ascended the throne and moved the capital from Luang Prabang to Vientiane to counter the threat of a Burmese invasion. Setthathirath became king in 1548 and commissioned That Luang. After Setthathirath disappeared in the mountains during a military campaign in Cambodia, Lan Xang entered a 70-year period of instability marked by civil war and Burmese invasions.

Sourigna Vongsa expanded Lan Xang's borders after taking the throne in 1637. When he died without an heir, the kingdom split into three principalities. Between 1763 and 1769, Burmese forces overran northern Laos and annexed Luang Prabang, while the Kingdom of Champasak came under Siamese suzerainty. The Siamese installed Anouvong as a vassal king of Vientiane. Anouvong patronized Lao arts and literature while seeking closer ties with Luang Prabang. Under Vietnamese pressure, he launched an unsuccessful rebellion against Siam in 1826; Vientiane was ransacked, and Anouvong died as a captive in Bangkok.

Because population control was prioritized over territorial expansion in traditional Southeast Asian warfare, military conflicts often targeted captives and resources. A British observer described an 1876 Siamese military campaign in Laos as "transformed into slave-hunting raids on a large scale".

=== French Laos ===
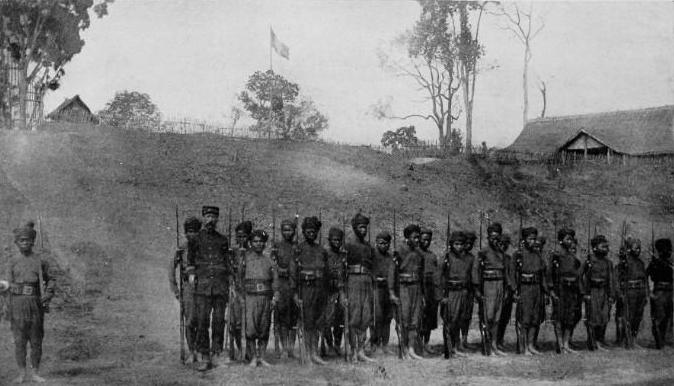
Local Lao soldiers in the French Colonial guard, c. 1900

In the 19th century, Luang Prabang was ransacked by the Chinese Black Flag Army. France rescued King Oun Kham and included Luang Prabang to the protectorate of French Indochina. The Kingdom of Champasak and the territory of Vientiane were later also added to the protectorate. King Sisavang Vong of Luang Prabang became ruler of a unified Laos under French control of the region, and Vientiane once again became the capital.

Laos produced tin, rubber, and coffee, while the country never accounted for more than 1% of French Indochina's exports. By 1940, around 600 French citizens lived in Laos. Under French rule, the Vietnamese were encouraged to migrate to Laos; this was seen by the French colonists as a rational solution to a labour shortage within the confines of an Indochina-wide colonial space. By 1943, the Vietnamese population stood at nearly 40,000, forming the majority in some cities of Laos and having the right to elect its own leaders. As a result, 53% of the population of Vientiane, 85% of Thakhek, and 62% of Pakse were Vietnamese; the exception was Luang Prabang, where the population was predominantly Lao. In 1945, the French drew up a plan to move some of the Vietnamese to the Vientiane Plain, Savannakhet region, and the Bolaven Plateau, which was derailed by the Japanese invasion of Indochina. Otherwise, according to Martin Stuart-Fox, the Lao might well have lost control over their own country.

During World War II, Vichy France, Thailand, Imperial Japan and Free France occupied Laos. On 9 March 1945, a nationalist group declared Laos independent, with Luang Prabang as its capital; on 7 April two battalions of Japanese troops occupied the city. The Japanese attempted to force Sisavang Vong (the king of Luang Prabang) to declare Laotian independence, and on 8 April he instead declared an end to Laos's status as a French protectorate. The king then secretly sent Prince Kindavong to represent Laos to the Allied forces and Prince Sisavang as representative to the Japanese. When Japan surrendered, some Lao nationalists (including Prince Phetsarath) declared Lao independence, and by 1946 French troops had reoccupied the country and conferred autonomy on Laos.

During the First Indochina War, the Indochinese Communist Party formed the Pathet Lao independence organization. The Pathet Lao began a war against the French colonial forces with the aid of the Vietnamese independence organization, the Viet Minh. In 1950, the French were forced to give Laos semi-autonomy as an "associated state" within the French Union. France remained in de facto control until 22 October 1953, when Laos gained full independence as a constitutional monarchy.

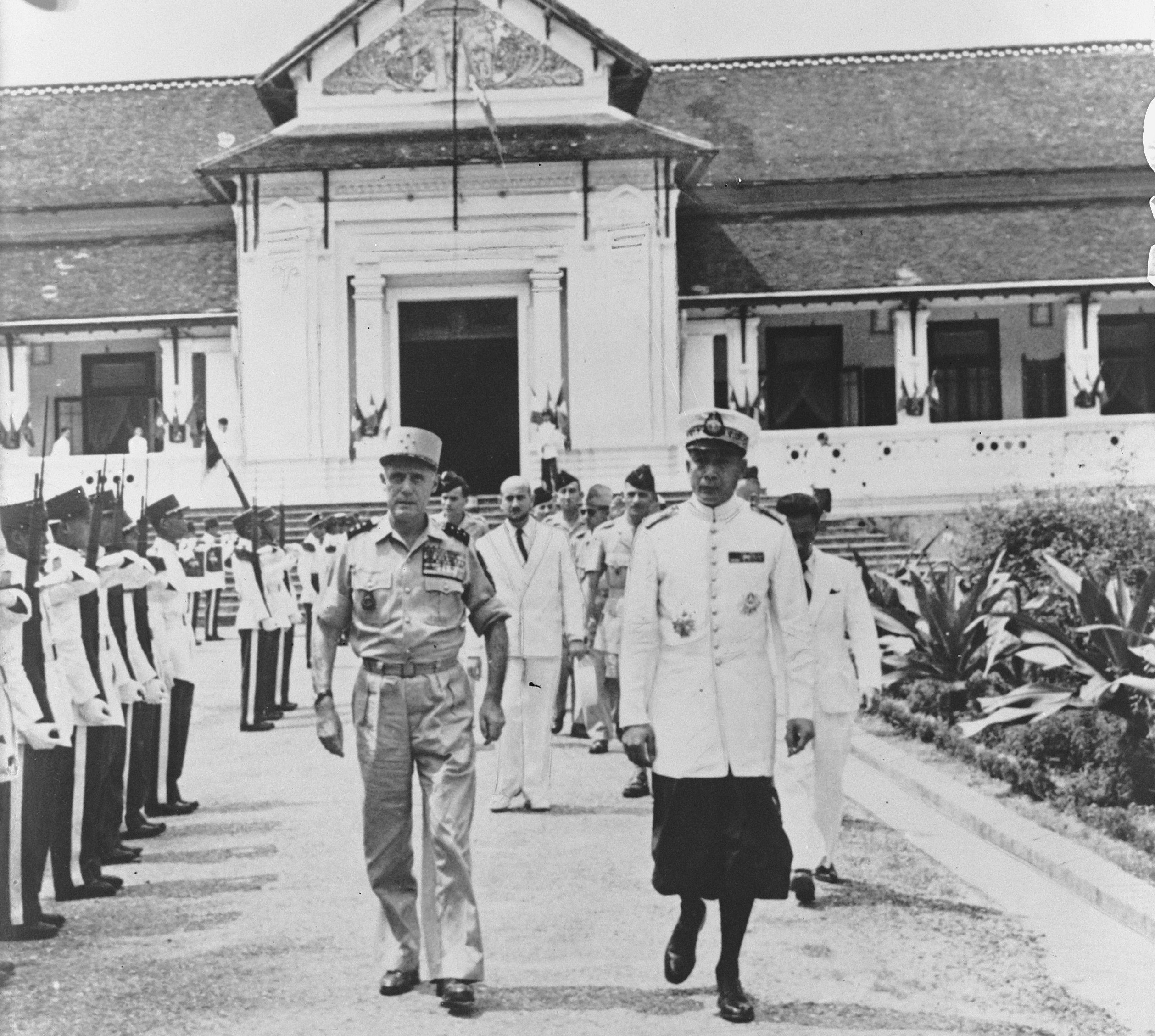
French general Raoul Salan and Prince Sisavang Vatthana in Luang Prabang, 4 May 1953

=== Independence, and communist state ===
The First Indochina War took place across French Indochina and eventually led to French defeat at the Battle of Dien Bien Phu and the signing of peace accord for Laos at the Geneva Conference of 1954. In 1960, amidst a series of rebellions in the Kingdom of Laos, fighting broke out between the Royal Lao Army and the communist Pathet Lao, a group allied with North Vietnam and the Soviet Union. A second provisional government of "National Union" formed by Prince Souvanna Phouma and the Pathet Lao in 1956 was unsuccessful; by 1959, the situation turned into civil war between the Royal Laotian government and the Pathet Lao. The Pathet Lao guerillas were backed militarily by the People's Army of Vietnam (PAVN) and the Viet Cong.

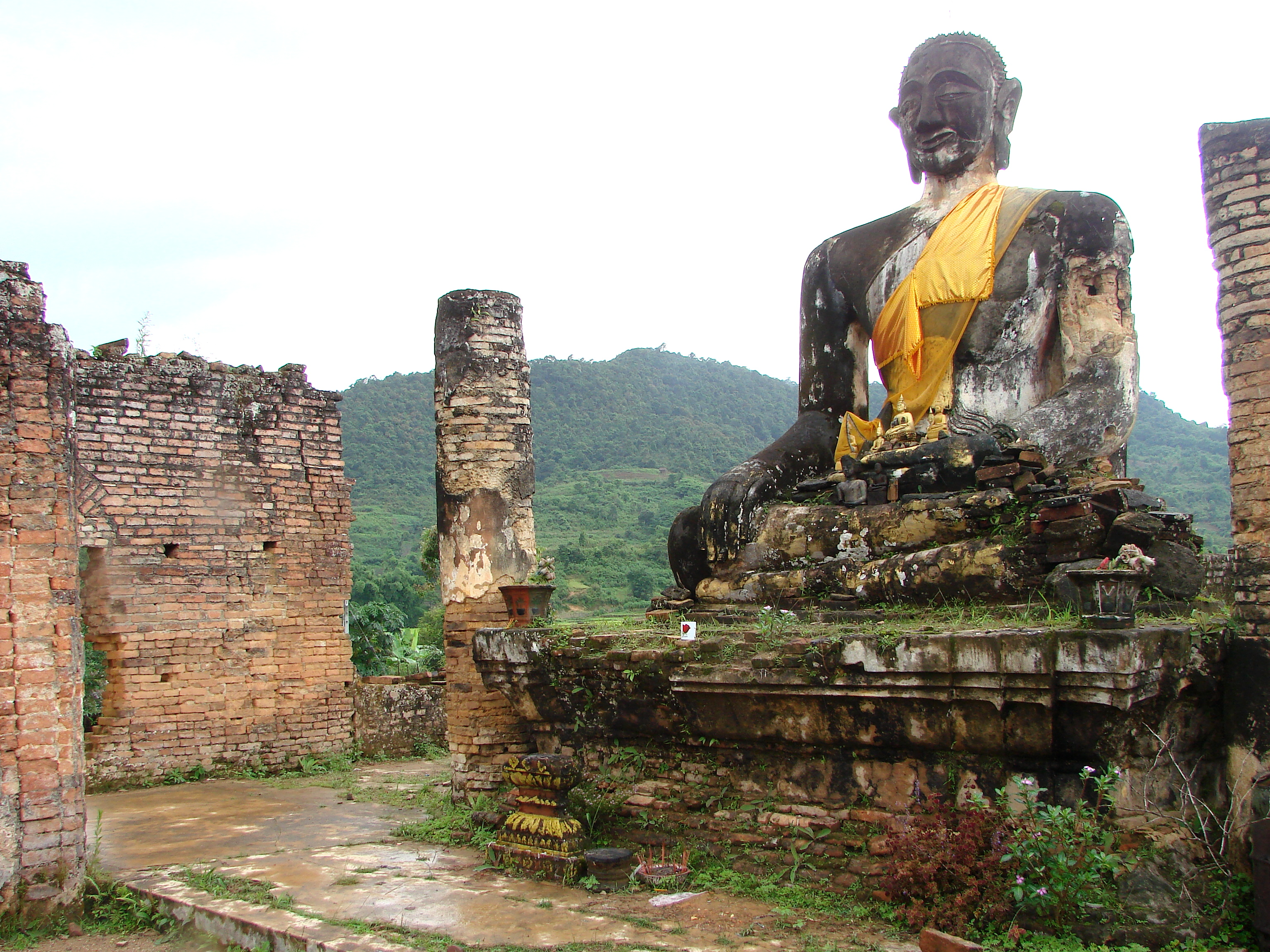
Ruins of Muang Khoun, former capital of Xiangkhouang province, destroyed by the American bombing of Laos in the 1960s

Laos became drawn into the Vietnam War, with parts of Laos were invaded and occupied by North Vietnam since 1958 for use as a supply route for its war against South Vietnam. In response, the United States initiated an aerial bombing campaign against the PAVN positions, supported regular and irregular anti-communist forces in Laos, and supported incursions into Laos by the Army of the Republic of Vietnam. Aerial bombardments against the PAVN/Pathet Lao forces were carried out to prevent the collapse of the Kingdom of Laos central government and to deny them use of the Ho Chi Minh Trail, the Vietnamese supply route that passed through Laos and Cambodia, to attack US forces in South Vietnam. Between 1964 and 1973, the US dropped more than 2 million tons of bombs on Laos, nearly as much as all the bombs dropped during World War II combined (American bombers dropped 2.1 million tons of bombs on Europe and Asia during World War II). This makes Laos the most heavily bombed country in history relative to the size of its population (per capita); The New York Times notes this was "nearly a ton for every person in Laos". Some 80 million bombs failed to explode and remain scattered throughout the country. Unexploded ordnance, including cluster munitions and mines, kill or maim approximately 50 people every year. As a result Laos became an advocate of the Convention on Cluster Munitions to ban the weapons and was host to the First Meeting of States Parties to the convention in 2010.

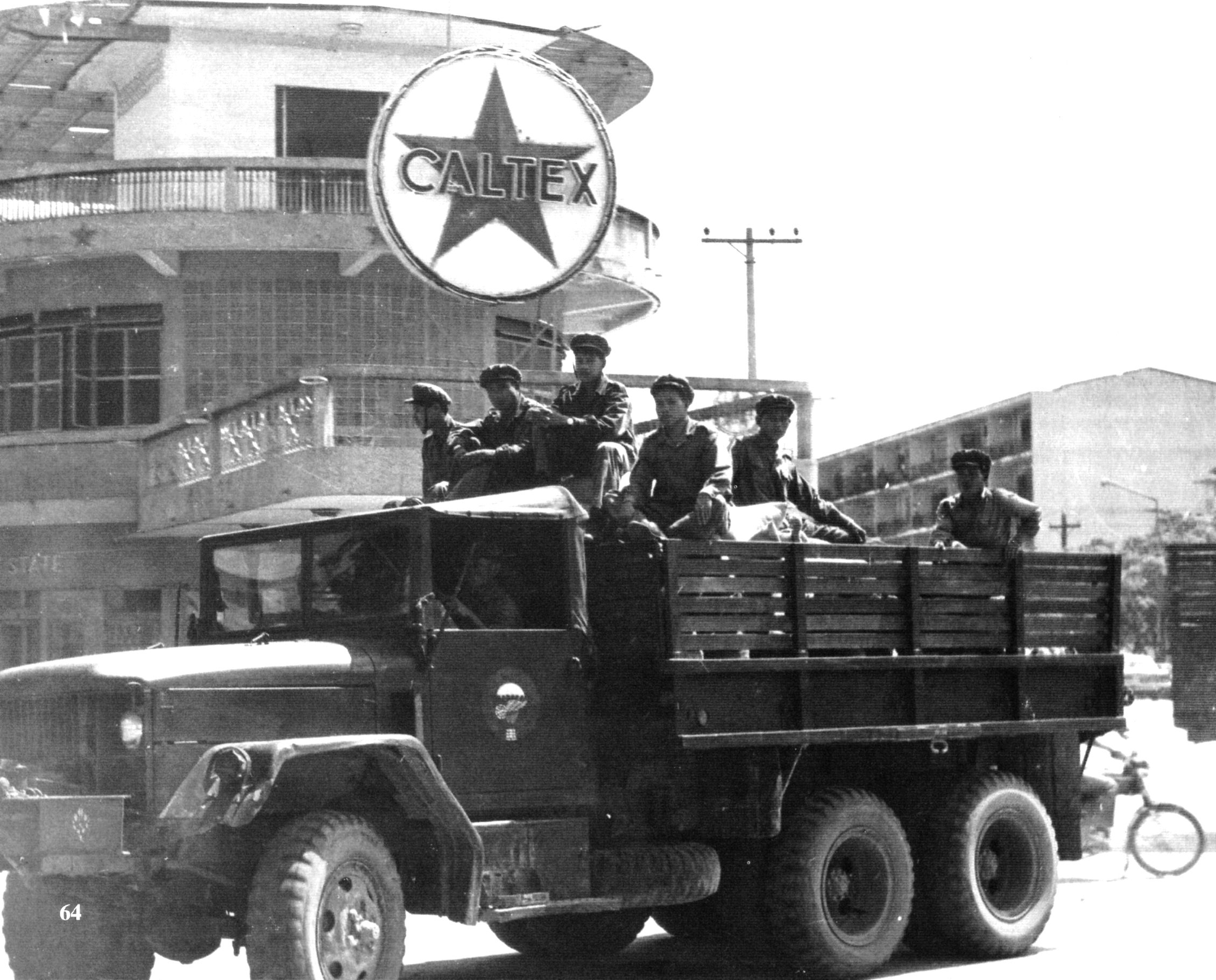
Pathet Lao soldiers in Vientiane, 1973

In 1975, the Pathet Lao overthrew the royalist government, forcing King Savang Vatthana to abdicate on 2 December 1975. He later died in a re-education camp in Vietnam. Between 20,000 and 62,000 Laotians died during the civil war. On 2 December 1975, after taking control of the country, the Pathet Lao government under Kaysone Phomvihane as head of the party renamed the country as the Lao People's Democratic Republic; the government signed agreements giving Vietnam the right to station armed forces and to appoint advisers to assist in overseeing the country. The ties between Laos and Vietnam were formalised via a treaty signed in 1977, which has since provided direction for Laotian foreign policy and provides the basis for Vietnamese involvement in Laotian political and economic life. In 1979, Laos was requested by Vietnam to end relations with the People's Republic of China; this led to isolation in trade by China, the United States, and other countries. In 1979, there were 50,000 PAVN troops stationed in Laos and as many as 6,000 civilian Vietnamese officials including 1,000 directly attached to the ministries in Vientiane.

The conflict between Hmong rebels and Laos continued in certain areas of Laos. In 1977, a communist newspaper promised the party would hunt down the "American collaborators" and their families "to the last root". As many as 200,000 Hmong went into exile in Thailand, with some ending up in the US. Other Hmong fighters hid out in mountains in Xiangkhouang Province for years, with a remnant emerging from the jungle in 2003.

== Politics ==
The LPDR is a unitary communist state that self-designates as a people's democratic state, meaning that, at least on paper, it is pursuing the transition of the country from capitalism to a socialist mode of production before commencing a transition from a socialist to a communist society. In The Economist's Democracy Index 2016, Laos was classified as an "authoritarian regime", ranking lowest of the nine ASEAN nations included in the study.

=== Lao People's Revolutionary Party ===
Flag of the ruling Lao People's Revolutionary Party

The Lao People's Revolutionary Party (LPRP) is the founding and ruling party of the LPDR. The leading role of the party over the country's political system is enshrined in Constitution of Laos, stating: "The rights of the multi-ethnic people to be the masters of the country are exercised and ensured through the functioning of the political system with the Lao People's Revolutionary Party as its leading nucleus." All state organs operate under the leadership of the LPRP; because of the party's organising, Marxist–Leninist principle of democratic centralism, all party members in state organs are required to implement the decisions of the Central Committee of the LPRP. The party establishes party groups within state organs, which the Central Committee supervises through its Secretariat and the Organisation Commission of the Lao People's Revolutionary Party.

The highest organ of the LPRP is the Congress of the Lao People's Revolutionary Party, which meets at least once every five years. It elects the members and candidates of the Central Committee. At its first session after a party congress, the Central Committee elects its central leading organs: the Politburo, the Secretariat, the Inspection Commission, and the Defence and Public Security Commission (DPSC). It also elects the party leader, the general secretary of the LPRP Central Committee. The general secretary leads the work of the Politburo while concurrently serving as chairperson of the DPSC. They co-lead the Secretariat with the Permanent Member of the Lao People's Revolutionary Party Central Committee's Secretariat. These organs are delegated specific powers of the Central Committee when the Central Committee is not in session; the Politburo is the party's highest decision-making organ when the Central Committee, the Conference, and the Congress are not in session. The party heads are elected by a session of the Central Committee.

The LPRP, as the leading force of the political system, has a legal monopoly on state power. According to scholar Martin Stuart-Fox, control is cemented by populating every state organ, bureaucracy, transmission belt mass organization, and the Lao People's Armed Forces (LPAF) with party members. The LPAF is tasked by the state constitution to defend the gains of the revolution. The LPRP's statute states that political leadership of the military and other security forces rests with the DPSC, which maintains direct, unified, and full control of the LPAF.

=== National Assembly ===
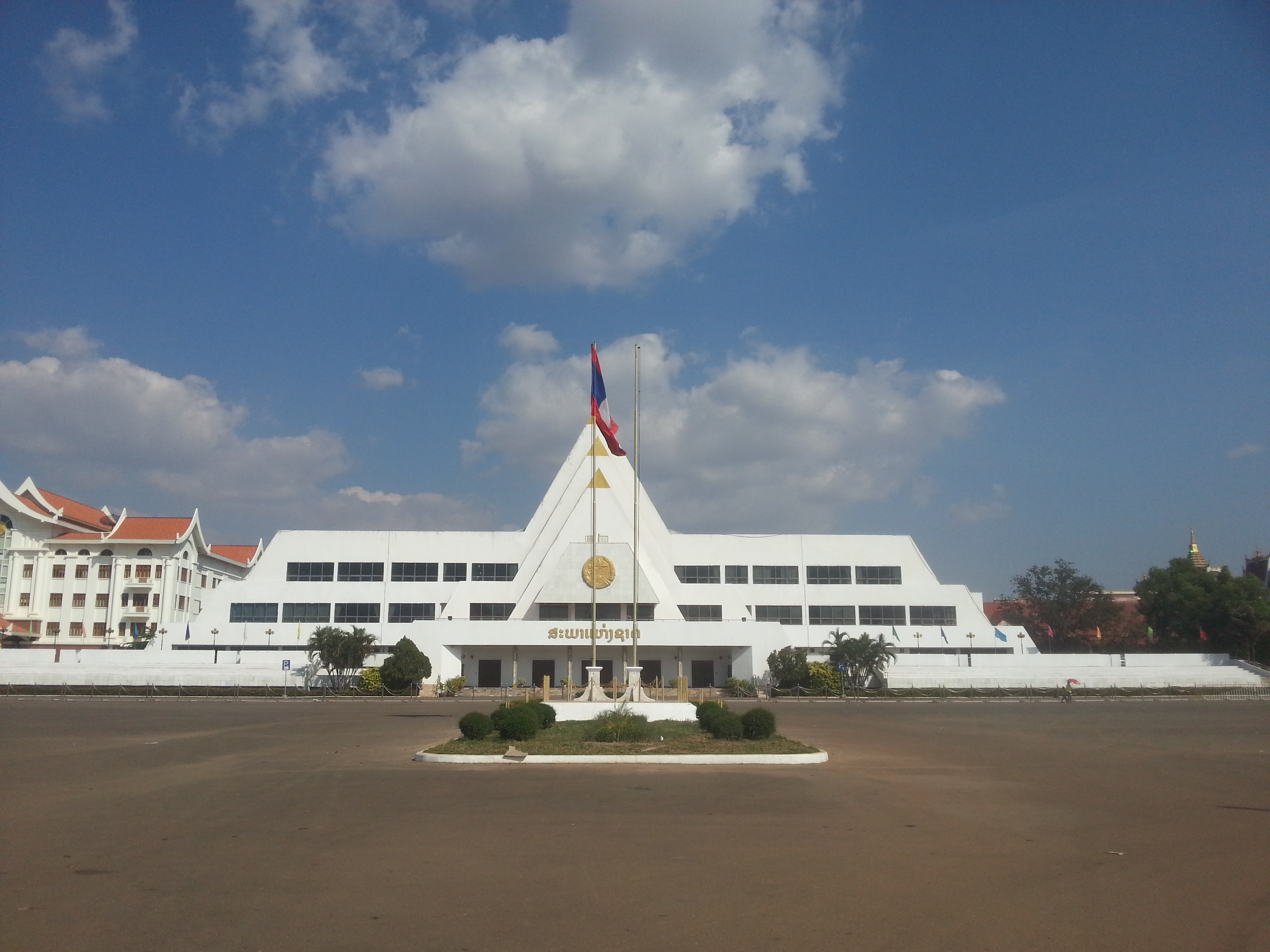
The seat of the National Assembly of Laos, the supreme state organ of power.

The National Assembly of Laos is the supreme state organ of power and formally holds the unified powers of the state. It is the only state organ that can adopt or amend the communist state constitution, which was adopted on 14 August 1991. The National Assembly is officially considered the embodiment of popular sovereignty since it is elected through elections in which candidates are vetted by the National Election Committee. The LPRP, state organs, the Lao Front for National Development, the largest transmission-belt mass organization in the country, and other transmission-belt mass organizations are allowed to nominate candidates to the National Election Committee, which can either approve or reject them.

The National Assembly is not a permanent organ, and in between its sessions it is led by its permanent organ, the Standing Committee. As the state's highest organ, the National Assembly is superior to all other state organs and accountable to it under democratic centralism, since, according to the constitution, "The National Assembly, the Local People's Assemblies and other state organisations are established and function in accordance with the principle of democratic centralism." As a result, the National Assembly establishes all other state organs that make up the unified state apparatus per the division of labour of state organs. The constitution has created the following hierarchy of state organs: the National Assembly as the highest, followed by the president of Laos, the government of Laos, the system of people's councils and their governments, the People's Supreme Court, the People's Supreme Procuratorate, the State Inspection Authority, the State Audit Organisation, and the National Election Committee. All these organs are, in theory, accountable to the National Assembly.

The National Assembly and its Standing Committee are headed by a chair and vice chairs. The chair concurrently serves ex officio as a member of the Standing Committee of the National Assembly, the Central Committee, and the Politburo. The National Assembly is empowered to adopt and amend laws and legislation. It can decide whether Laos should approve, withdraw, or cancel international treaties. The National Assembly is responsible for adopting a five-year work plan for itself and for all inferior state organs. It can rescind legislation issued by other state organs if it conflicts with adopted laws or the constitution. The National Assembly also adopts a five-year plan for economic development, known as the National Socio-Economic Development Plan, and a state budget plan. It has the right to hold individuals it elects or appoints to state organs accountable for their work and to check whether these individuals are implementing the policies adopted by the National Assembly. Since it is not in permanent session, the National Assembly delegates some of its powers to its Standing Committee under the constitution, and it can delegate specific powers through a majority vote at one of its sessions. All inferior state organs and the Lao Front for National Development can propose legislation and amendments to the constitution to the National Assembly.

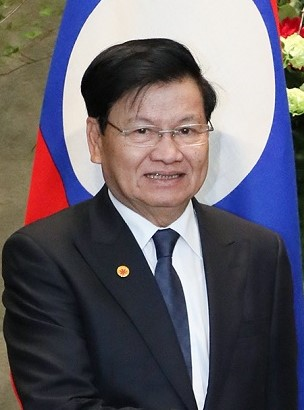
Thongloun Sisoulith,
LPRP general secretary and president since 2021

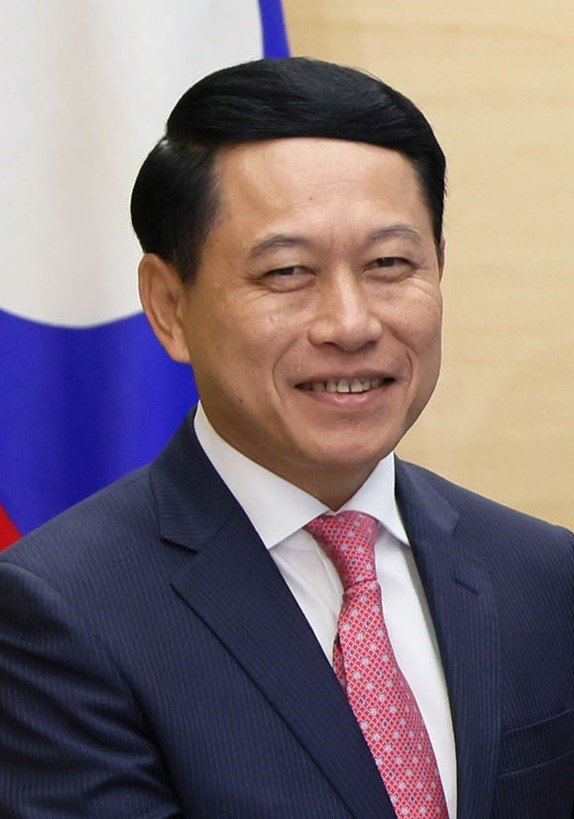
Saleumxay Kommasith,
prime minister since 2026

The president is the head of state and concurrently serves as the LPRP general secretary. The president is bound by a term limit of two consecutive electoral terms. The president is empowered to promulgate the constitution and the laws of the state, issue presidential decrees and edicts, convene and preside over special sessions of the government, and attend sessions of the Standing Committee of the National Assembly if deemed necessary. The president can instigate the appointment, reassignment, and removal of deputy prime ministers and members of the government, the vice president of the People's Supreme Court and the Deputy People's Supreme Procurator, the vice president of the State Audit Organisation, and the vice president of the State Inspection Authority on the approval of the National Assembly. Should the president be incapacitated, the vice president takes over duties.

The government is the supreme executive and administrative organ of state power and is headed by the prime minister, who serves as head of government. The prime minister is elected by the National Assembly on the president's recommendation. No member of the government may serve more than two electoral terms. The members of the government are dually responsible to the president and the National Assembly, and can be removed by the National Assembly through a vote of no confidence. The government is responsible for leading state economic policy and administering the Laotian state on behalf of the National Assembly and the LPRP.

The National Assembly heads the system of people's councils and the system of state organs of power, which control the state apparatus at lower levels, and these lower-level people's councils elect the people's governments at their corresponding levels. People's councils exist at the provincial, district, and village levels. Their powers mirror those of the National Assembly in their own jurisdiction. The people's governments at the provincial, district, and village levels are elected by the people's councils and are accountable to them, and to the government as the supreme executive and administrative organ of state power.

Laos has two judicial organs: the People’s Supreme Court (PSC), the supreme judicial organ, and the People's Supreme Procuratorate (PSP), the supreme procuratorial organ. Both are considered political organs because they implement the political line adopted by the National Assembly, which operates under the LPRP's leadership. The PSC is solely focused on adjudication. It heads the unified system of judicial organs and leads nationwide judicial work. The PSP monitors the implementation of the constitution and laws in all state organs and society at large. It is also empowered to initiate investigations against suspected wrongdoers and file cases against defendants in court.

Auditing and anti-corruption work are the responsibility of the State Audit Organisation (SAO), the supreme auditing organ, and the State Inspection Authority (SIA), the supreme supervisory organ. SAO is tasked with conducting an audit of the use of the state budget, finances, and use of state assets. It is responsible for auditing all state organs, transmission belt mass organisations, and organisations financed by the state budget, state funds, or state assets. The SAO president is responsible to the National Assembly and its permanent organ, as well as to the prime minister. The SIA leads anti-corruption work in all state organisations and organisations financed from the state budget, state funds, and state assets.

The National Election Committee (NEC) is a non-permanent organ elected by the National Assembly. It is responsible for organising the elections of the people's councils and the National Assembly. The NEC sets the date of election day, which is promulgated through a presidential decree. It is also responsible for disseminating election information to the public. The NEC also plans the composition of the National Assembly. For the 2026 Laotian legislative election, for example, it set a target of at least 30% of elected members being female.

=== Foreign relations ===
Prime Minister of the Lao People's Democratic Republic, Thongloun Sisoulith (2nd from right) and other heads of state and heads of government at the ASEAN–India summit in New Delhi on 25 January 2018

The foreign relations of Laos after the takeover by the Pathet Lao in December 1975 were characterised by a hostile posture toward the West, with the government of the LPDR aligning itself with the Soviet Bloc, maintaining ties with the Soviet Union, and depending on the Soviet state for most of its foreign assistance.

Laos's emergence from international isolation has been marked through expanded relations with other countries including Russia, China, Thailand, Australia, Germany, the United Kingdom, Japan, and Switzerland. Trade relations with the United States were normalised in November 2004 through Congressionally approved legislation. Laos was admitted into the Association of Southeast Asian Nations (ASEAN) in July 1997 and acceded to the World Trade Organization in 2016. In 2005, it attended the inaugural East Asia Summit.

=== Human rights ===
Ostensibly, the constitution that was promulgated in 1991 and amended in 2003 contains safeguards for human rights. For example, Article 8 states that Laos is a multinational state and is committed to equality between ethnic groups. The constitution contains provisions for gender equality, freedom of religion, freedom of speech, freedom of the press, and freedom of assembly. In 2009, Laos ratified the International Covenant on Civil and Political Rights, nine years after signing the treaty. The stated policy objectives of the Laotian government and international donors remain focused upon achieving sustainable economic growth and poverty reduction.

Amnesty International has raised concerns in relation to freedom of expression, prison conditions, restrictions on freedom of religions, protection of refugees and asylum-seekers, and the death penalty. Laos has been cited as an origin country for human trafficking, with some citizens being victims of sex trafficking. The government sometimes controls media channels to prevent critique of its actions. Citizens who have criticised the government have been subjected to enforced disappearances, arrests and torture.

== Economy ==
GDP per capita development in Laos

Pakse has experienced growth based on cross-border trade with Thailand and Vietnam. In 2009, the Obama administration in the US declared Laos was no longer a communist state and lifted bans on Lao companies receiving financing from the US Export-Import Bank. In 2016, China was the biggest foreign investor in the Lao economy, having invested US$5.395 billion since 1989, according to the Laos Ministry of Planning and Investment's 1989–2014 report. Thailand (invested US$4.489 billion) and Vietnam (invested US$3.108 billion) are the second and third largest investors respectively.

Subsistence agriculture accounts for half of the GDP and provides 80% of employment. 4% of the country is arable land, and 0.3% is used as permanent crop land, the lowest percentage in the Greater Mekong Subregion. The irrigated areas account for 28% of area under cultivation which, in turn, represents 12% of the agricultural land in 2012. Rice dominates agriculture, with about 80% of the arable land area used for growing rice. Approximately 77% of farm households are self-sufficient in rice.

Laos imports petroleum and gas. The government hopes to attract foreign investment to develop the deposits of coal, gold, bauxite, tin, copper, and other metals. The mining industry of Laos has received attention with foreign direct investments. More than 540 mineral deposits of gold, copper, zinc, lead and other minerals have been identified, explored and mined. The water resources and mountainous terrain enable it to produce and export quantities of hydroelectric energy. Of the potential capacity of approximately 18,000 megawatts, around 8,000 megawatts have been committed for export to Thailand and Vietnam. As of 2021, Laos continues to rely on fossil fuels, coal in particular, in domestic electricity production.

In 2018, the country ranked 139th on the Human Development Index, indicating medium development. According to the Global Hunger Index (2018), Laos ranks as the 36th hungriest nation in the world out of the list of the 52 nations with the worst hunger situations. In 2019, the UN Special Rapporteur on extreme poverty and human rights conducted an official visit to Laos and found that the top-down approach to economic growth and poverty alleviation "is all too often counterproductive, leading to impoverishment and jeopardizing the rights of the poor and marginalized."

The largest beer brand in the country, Beerlao, started being exported in 2017 to more than 20 countries worldwide. It is produced by the Lao Brewery Company.

=== Tourism ===
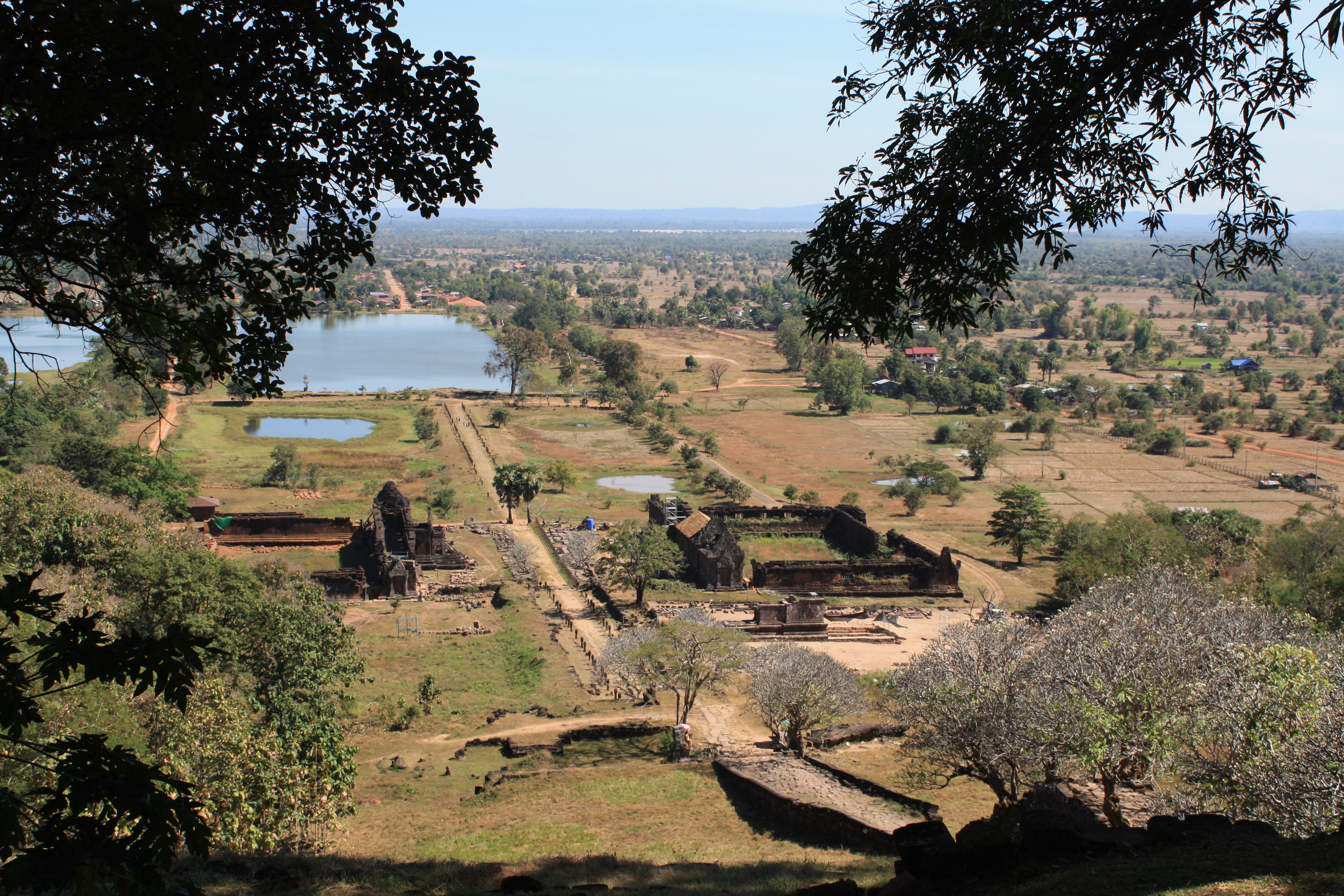
Near the sanctuary on the upper level of Vat Phou, looking back towards the Mekong River

The tourism sector has grown from 80,000 international visitors in 1990, to 1.876 million in 2010, when tourism had been expected to rise to US$1.5857 billion by 2020. In 2010, 1 in 11 jobs was in the tourism sector. Export earnings from international visitors and tourism goods are expected to generate 16% of total exports or US$270.3 million in 2010, growing in nominal terms to US$484.2 million (12.5% of the total) in 2020. The European Council on Trade and Tourism awarded the country the "World Best Tourist Destination" designation for 2013 for architecture and history. In 2024, tourist numbers topped 5 million, contributing over US$1 billion to the economy.

The Laotian National Tourism Administration, related government agencies and the private sector are working together to realise the vision put forth in the country's National Ecotourism Strategy and Action Plan. This includes decreasing the environmental and cultural impact of tourism; increasing awareness in the importance of ethnic groups and biological diversity; providing a source of income to conserve, sustain and manage the Laotian protected area network and cultural heritage sites; and emphasising the need for tourism zoning and management plans for sites that will be developed as ecotourism destinations.

=== Transportation ===
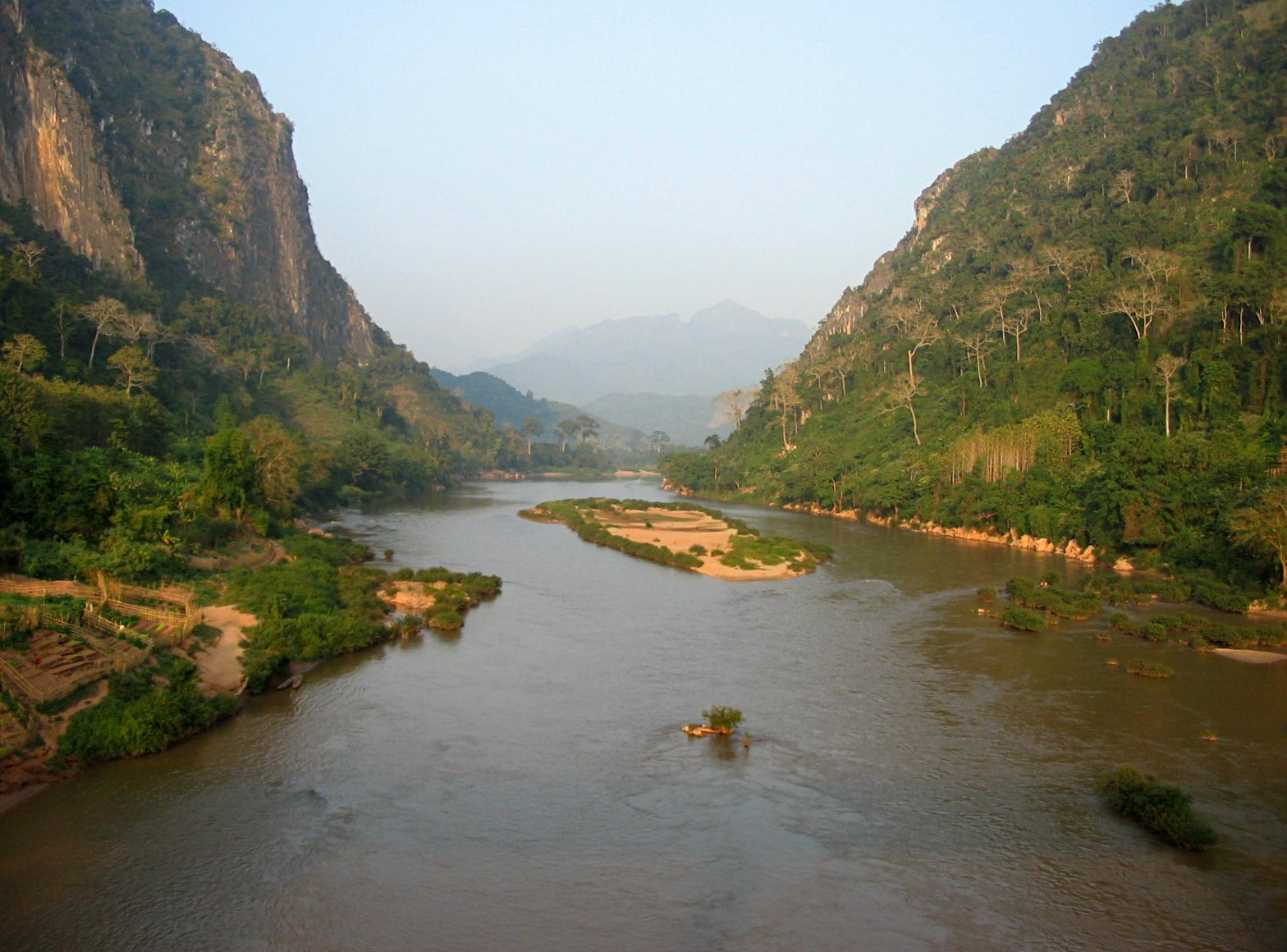
Rivers are a means of transport in Laos.

Laos's first railway line, a 3-km long metre-gauge railway that connects southern Vientiane to Thailand, opened in 2009. The 422-km long Boten–Vientiane railway runs from Vientiane to Boten at the northern border with China, built as part of China's Belt and Road Initiative.

In 2025, Vientiane started the implementation process for a Bus Rapid Transport system (BRT), which was put on hold in December 2025 due to organisational complications. It came as part of a plan for sustainable urban transport in Vientiane.

93% of households have a telephone, either fixed line or mobile. Electricity is available to 93% of the population.

=== Water supply ===
According to the World Bank data conducted in 2014, Laos has met the Millennium Development Goal targets on water and sanitation regarding the UNICEF/WHO Joint Monitoring Programme. As of 2018, there are approximately 1.9 million of Lao's population who could not access an improved water supply and 2.4 million people without access to improved sanitation.

Laos has made progress increasing access to sanitation. In 1990, 8% of the rural population had access to improved sanitation. Access rose from 10% in 1995 to 38% in 2008. Between 1995 and 2008, approximately 1,232,900 more people had access to improved sanitation in rural areas. The authorities have developed an innovative regulatory framework for public–private partnership contracts signed with enterprises, in parallel with more conventional regulation of state-owned water enterprises.

== Demographics ==
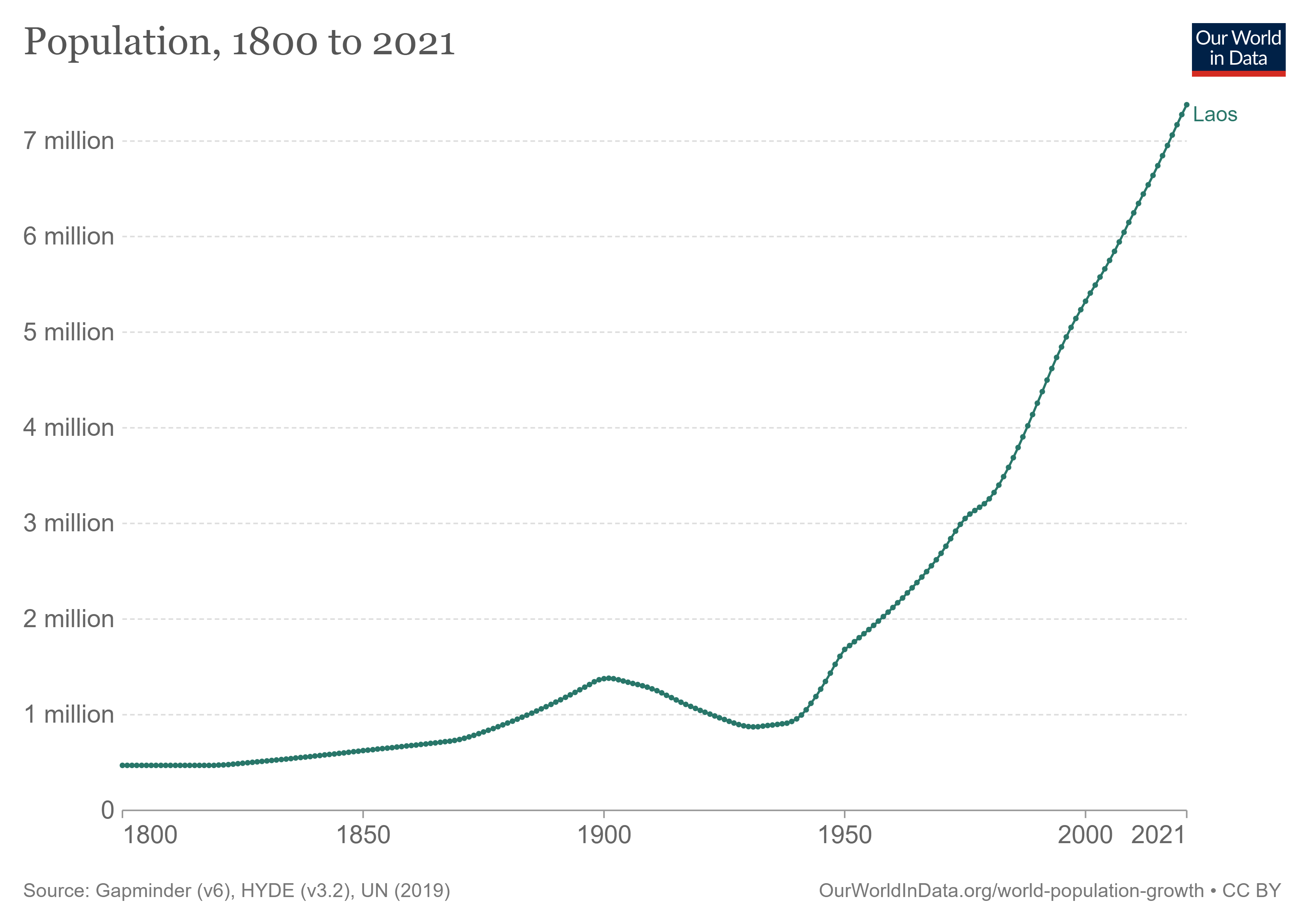
Population graph of Laos, number of inhabitants in millions between 1800 and 2021 (Our World in Data data, 2022)

The population in 2024 is estimated to be 7,769,819, with an approximately even distribution of females and males (49.8% female). This makes Laos the 103rd most populous country in the world.

=== Ethnicity ===
The people of Laos are categorised by their distribution by elevation (lowlands, midlands and uplands), as this somewhat correlates with ethnic groupings. More than half of the population is ethnic Lao—the principal lowland inhabitants. The Lao belong to the Tai linguistic group who began migrating south from China in the first millennium AD. 10% belong to other "lowland" groups, which together with the Lao people make up the Lao Loum (lowland people).

In the central and southern mountains, Mon-Khmer-speaking groups, known as Lao Theung or mid-slope Laotians, predominate. Other terms are Khmu, Khamu (Kammu) or Kha as the Lao Loum refer to them to indicate their Austroasiatic language affiliation. The latter is considered pejorative, meaning 'slave'. They were the indigenous inhabitants of northern Laos. Some Vietnamese, Laotian Chinese and Thai minorities remain, particularly in the towns, and some left after independence in the 1940s, some of whom relocated either to Vietnam, Hong Kong, or to France. Lao Theung constitute about 30% of the population.

Hill people and minority cultures of Laos such as the Hmong, Yao (Mien) (Hmong-Mien), Dao, Shan, and Tibeto-Burman speaking peoples have lived in isolated regions of Laos for years. Mountain/hill tribes of mixed ethno/cultural-linguistic heritage are found in northern Laos, which include the Lua and Khmu people who are indigenous to Laos. Collectively, they are known as Lao Soung or highland Laotians. Lao Soung account for about 10% of the population.

=== Languages ===
The official language is Lao, a language of the Tai-Kadai language family. The Lao alphabet, which evolved sometime between the 13th and 14th centuries, was derived from the Khmer script. Languages like Khmu (Austroasiatic) and Hmong (Hmong-Mien) are spoken by minorities, particularly in the midland and highland areas. A number of Laotian sign languages are used in areas with higher rates of congenital deafness.

French is used in government and commerce, and Laos is a member of the French-speaking organisation of La Francophonie. The organisation estimated in 2010 that there were 173,800 French speakers in Laos. English, the language of the ASEAN, has become increasingly studied.

=== Religion ===
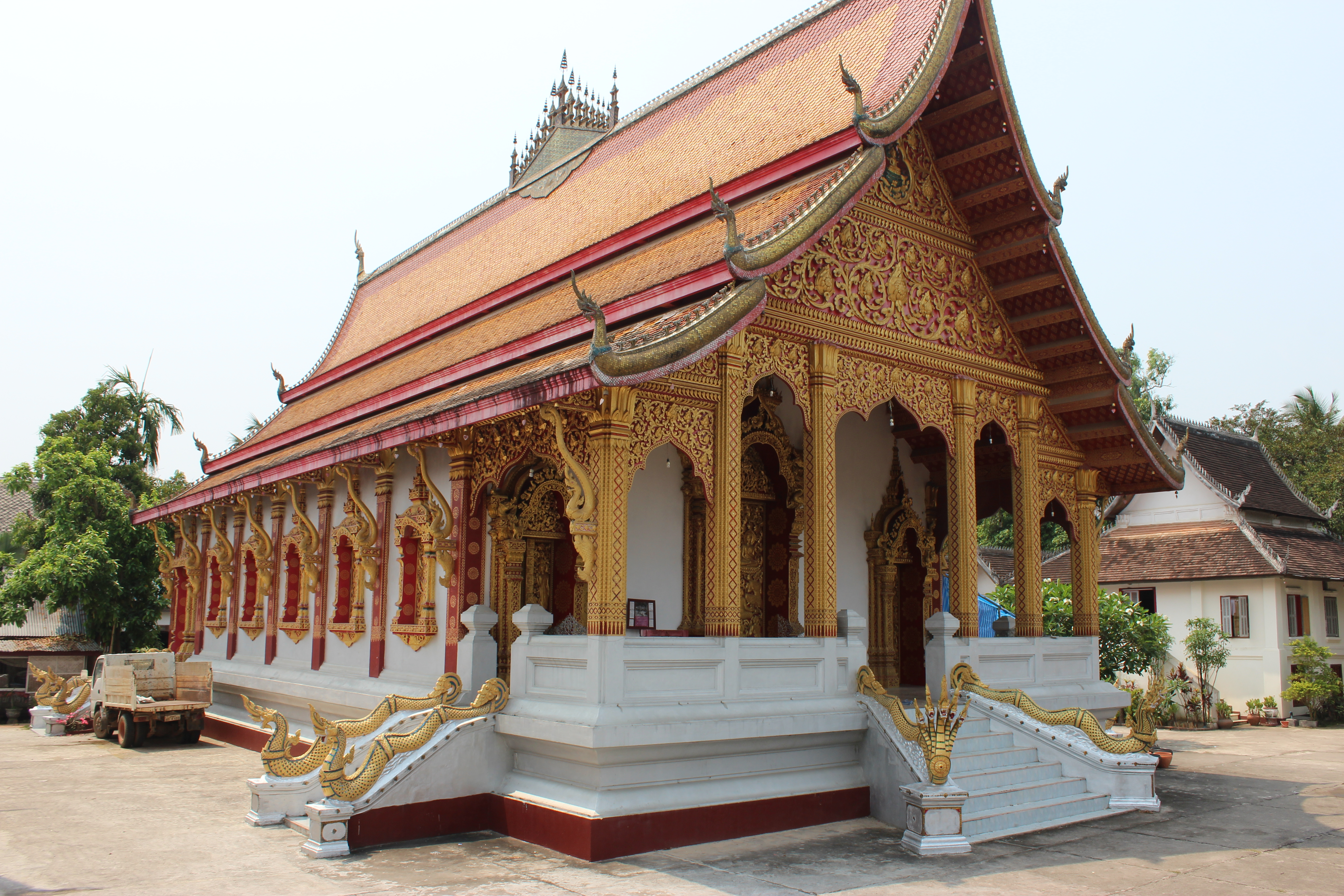
Wat Nong Sikhounmuang pagoda in Luang Prabang

66% of Laotians were Theravada Buddhist, 1.5% Christian, 0.1% Muslim, 0.1% Jewish, and 32.3% were from other religions or traditions (mostly practitioners of Tai folk religion, or Satsana Phi) in 2010.

=== Health ===
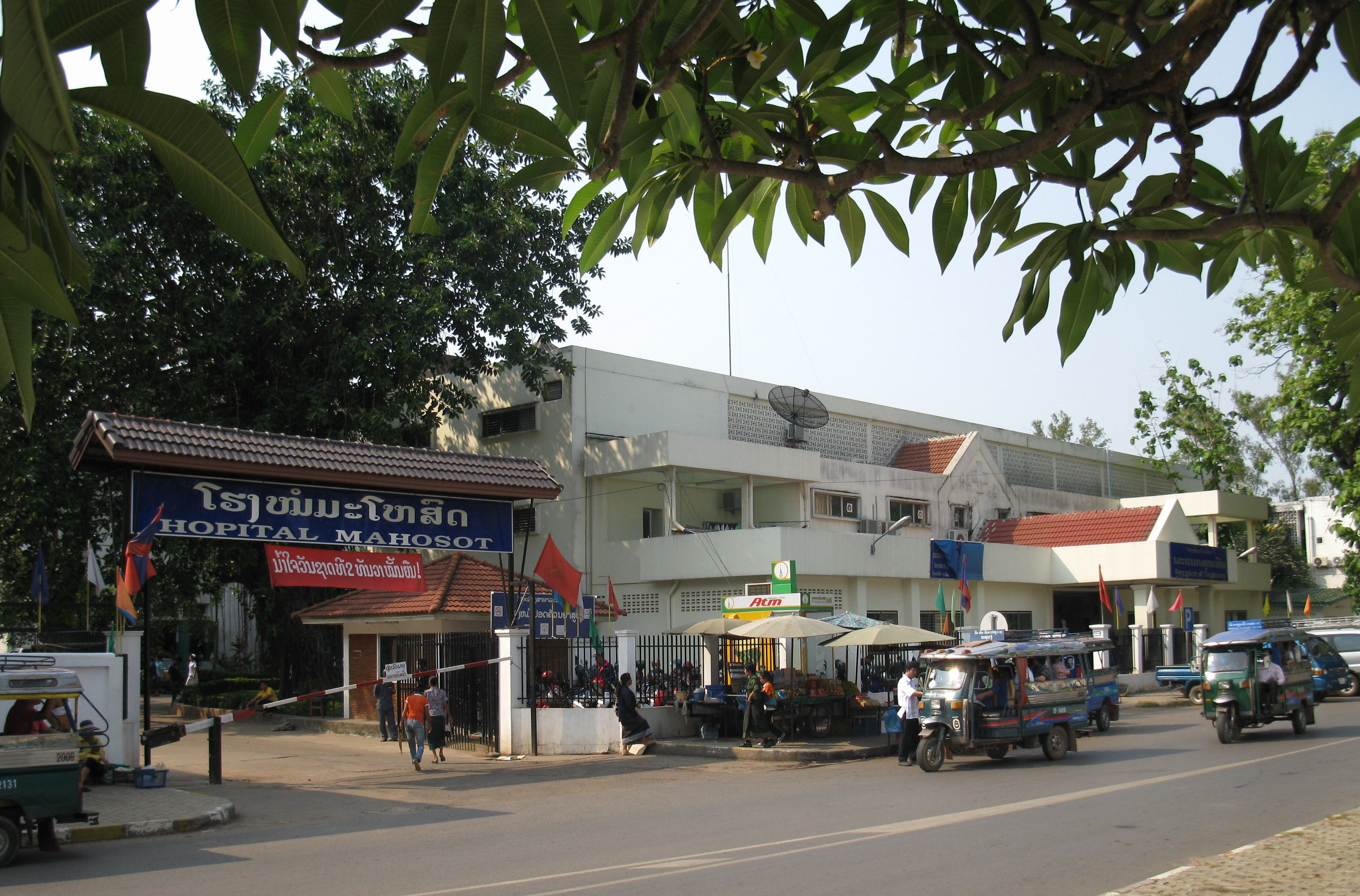
Mahosot Hospital in Vientiane

Female life expectancy at birth was at 70.7 years and male was at 67.4 years in 2025. Healthy life expectancy was 54 years in 2007. Government expenditure on health is about 4% of GDP, about US$18 billion (PPP) in 2006.

=== Education ===
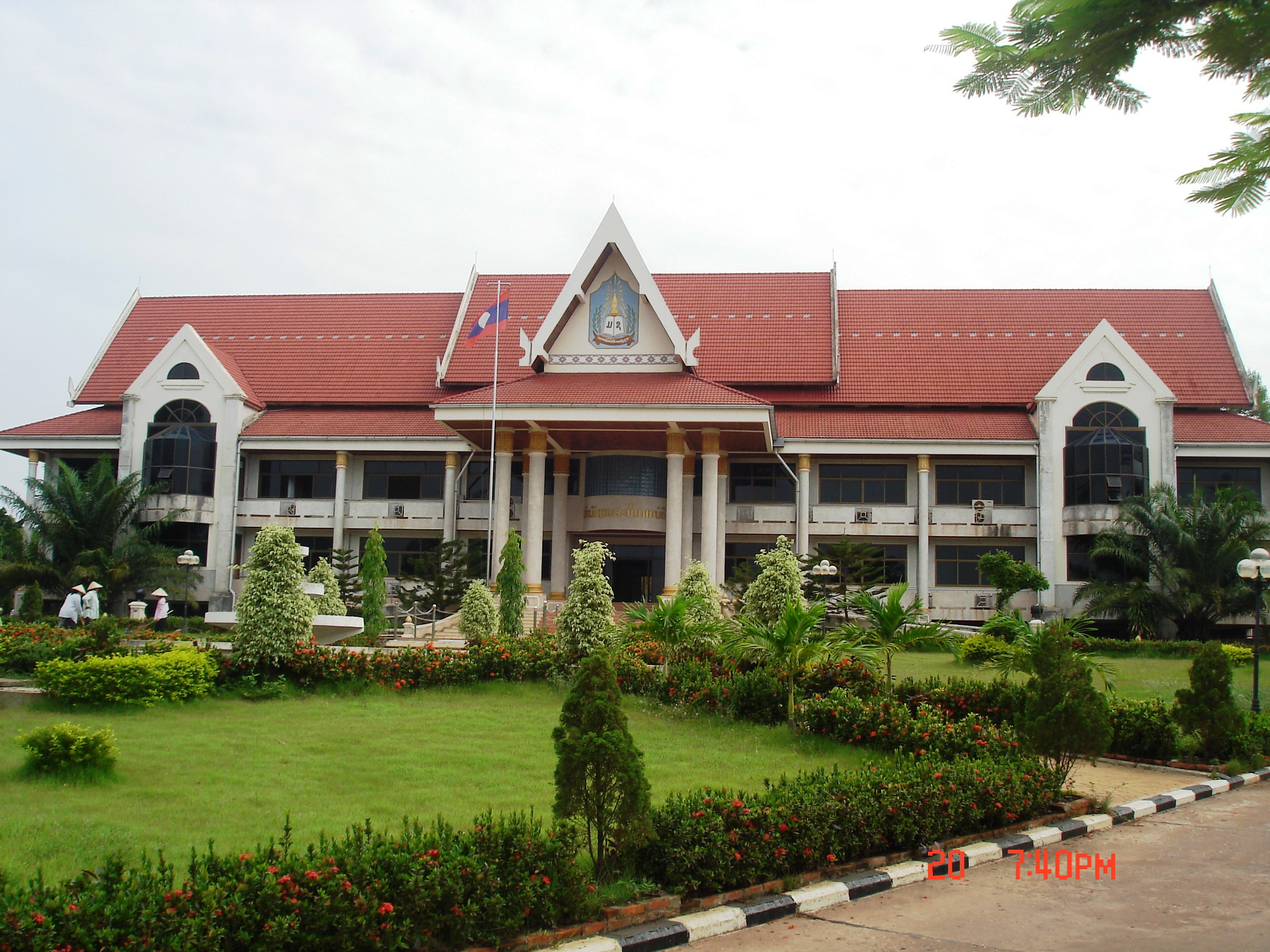
National University of Laos in Vientiane

The adult literacy rate for women in 2017 was 62.9%; for adult men, 78.1%. In 2004, the net primary enrolment rate was 84%. Laos was ranked 109th in the Global Innovation Index in 2025.

== Culture ==
=== Cuisine ===
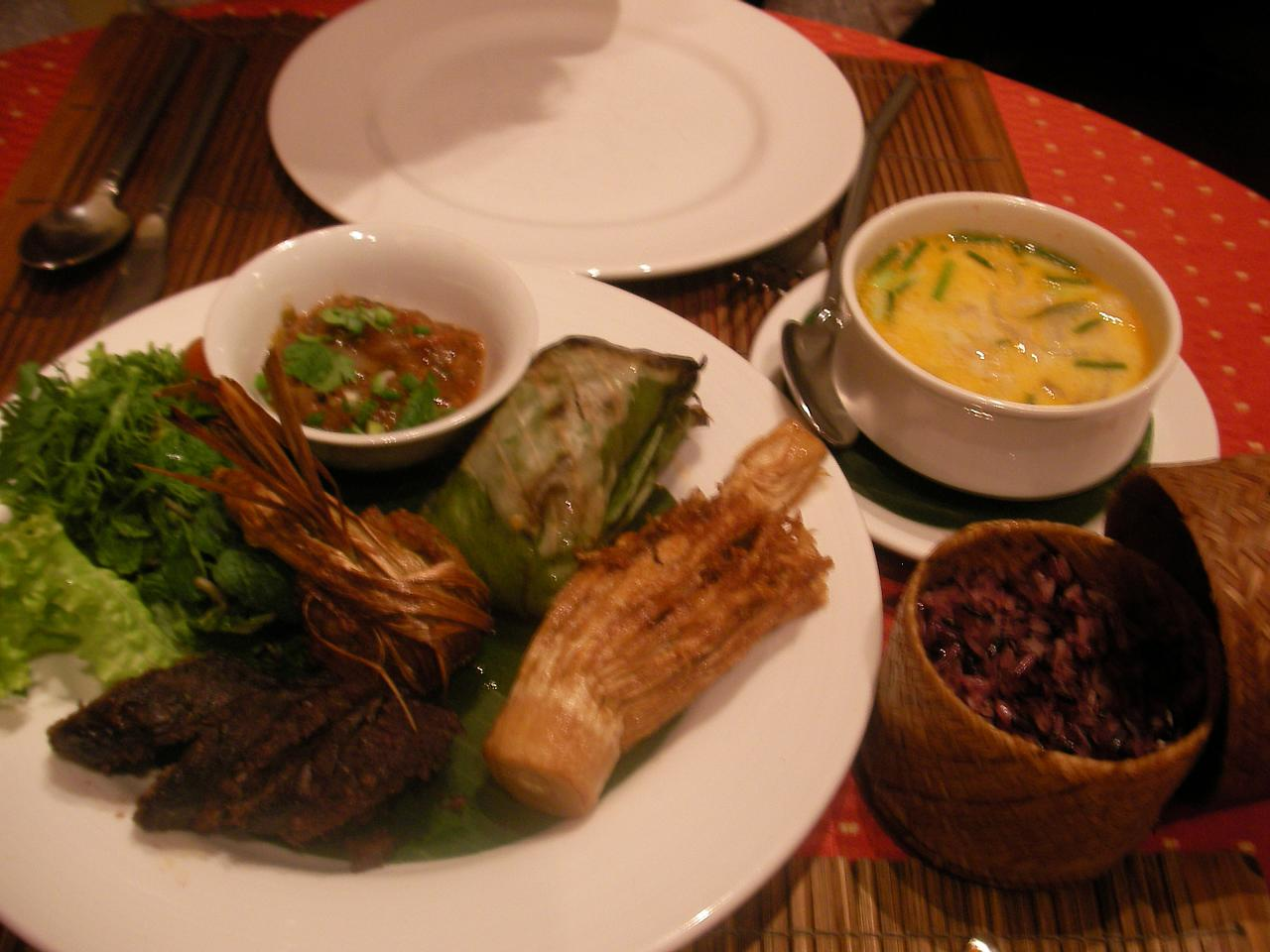
An example of Lao cuisine

Sticky rice (khao niao) is a staple food. There are traditions and rituals associated with rice production in environments and among ethnic groups. For example, Khammu farmers in Luang Prabang plant the rice variety khao kam near the farm house in memory of dead parents, or at the edge of the rice field to indicate that parents are alive.

The Lao national dish is Larb (also spelled Laap or Laab), a dish in which chopped meat is blended with toasted rice and then seasoned with herbs, fish sauce, and lime.

Other traditional dishes include Tam Mak Hoong, or green papaya salad, Khao Poon or rice noodle soup, and Sai Oua sausadge.

=== Cinema ===
The first feature-length film made after the monarchy was abolished is Gun Voice from the Plain of Jars directed by Somchith Pholsena in 1983, and its release was prevented by a censorship board. A commercial feature-length film was Sabaidee Luang Prabang, made in 2008. The 2017 documentary feature film Blood Road was predominantly shot and produced in Laos with assistance from the government. It was recognised with a News and Documentary Emmy Award in 2018.

Australian filmmaker Kim Mordaunt's first feature film was made in Laos and features a Laotian cast speaking their native language. Entitled The Rocket, the film appeared at the 2013 Melbourne International Film Festival and won three awards at the Berlin International Film Festival. Examples of Lao feature films that have received international recognition include Lao New Wave Cinema's At the Horizon, directed by Anysay Keola, which was screened at the OzAsia Film Festival, and Lao Art Media's Chanthaly, directed by Mattie Do, which was screened at the 2013 Fantastic Fest. In September 2017, Laos submitted Dearest Sister, Mattie Do's second feature film, to the 90th Academy Awards (or the Oscars) for consideration for Best Foreign Language Film, marking the country's first submission for the Oscars.

As of 2018, Laos has three theatres dedicated to showing films.

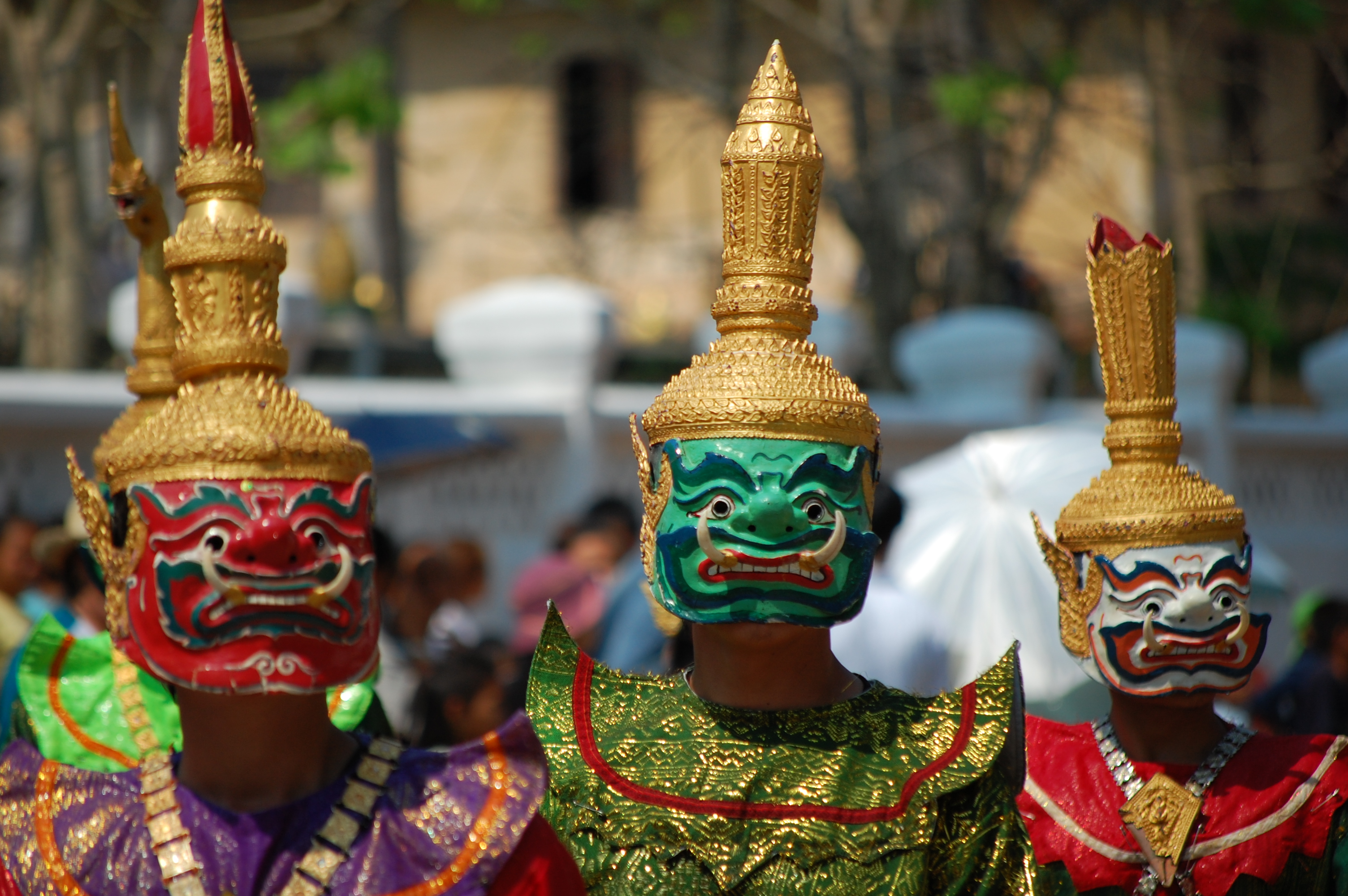
Dancers during the New Year celebration

=== Sport ===
The martial art of muay Lao, the national sport, is a form of kickboxing similar to Thailand's muay Thai, Burmese Lethwei and Cambodian Pradal Serey.

== See also ==
- Drug policy in Laos
- Energy in Laos
- Freedom of the press in Laos
- Mass media in Laos
- Outline of Laos
