= 11th Central Committee of the Lao People's Revolutionary Party =

2021–2026 highest organ

The 11th Central Committee was elected at the 11th National Congress of the Lao People's Revolutionary Party on 15 January 2021, and was composed of 71 ordinary members and ten substitutes. As an institution, the Central Committee is the party's highest decision-making body between convocations of the National Congress, which convenes every fifth year. Since the LPRP has a monopoly on state power in Laos, the Central Committee formulates policies which the state implements. In between plenary sessions of the 11th Central Committee, the 11th Politburo was the party's highest decision-making body.

The numbers of members increased from 69 ordinary 8 substitutes in the 10th Central Committee to 71 ordinary and substitutes in the 11th. Of the 71 ordinary members, twelve are women. This was an increase from six in the 10th. Military representation increased by one spot, from seven (10th) to eighth (11th). Additionally, 36 members are aged 60 and over, that is 50,70% of members. The remaining 40,30%, the remaining 35 members, are aged 46 to 59 years. 19 members, accounting for 26,76%, who joined the LPRP during the Lao revolution. Education wise the majority of members have passed a test in Marxist–Leninist theory. Of the 71 members, 28 have a PhD (39,43%) and 27 who have a master's Degree (38,02%).

Many members of the 11th Central Committee were related by blood to former LPRP leaders. Four members were the children of former LPRP Chairman Khamtai Siphandon (Sonexay, Viengthong, Viengsavath and Athsaphangthong) and another three were the children of former LPRP General Secretary Kaysone Phomvihane (Xaysomphone, Santiphab and Thongsavanh). Of these, two of the term serve in the 11th Politburo (Xaysomphone and Sonexay) and on in the 11th Secretariat (Viengthong)." Bounkham Vorachit, the daughter of outgoing LPRP General Secretary Bounnhang Vorachit, was also elected to the 11th. Lao analyst Martin Stuart-Fox opine that "These promotions serve as a reminder of the extent to which powerful families still determine political outcomes in Laos — just as they did during the previous Royal Lao regime." Assistant Professor Simon Creak noted that the 11th Central Committee was the first elected leadership body not dominated by the revolutionary generation. He also considered the possibility of there being a conflict between party leaders who've gained power through family patronage and those who rose through the party ranks by technocratic means. The former espouse more modern values, such as party discipline and socialist state-building Creak contends. However, Creak notes that "Speculation aside, talk of tension between patronage and technocratic socialism would be premature. Revolutionary family patronage networks are unlikely to fade anytime soon. Sonexay may have failed to leapfrog rivals, but the Siphandone family boosted its representation in the Central Committee, as did other influential families."

== Plenums ==
Plenum	Start–end	Length	Ref
1st Plenary Session	15 January 2021	1 day	
2nd Plenary Session	1–3 March 2021	3 days	
3rd Plenary Session	18–22 October 2021	5 days	
4th Plenary Session	18–26 May 2022	9 days	
5th Plenary Session	13–20 October 2022	8 days	
6th Plenary Session	5–9 June 2023	5 days	
7th Plenary Session	23–26 October 2023	4 days	
8th Plenary Session	13–17 May 2024	5 days	
9th Plenary Session	28 October – 1 November 2024	5 days	
1st Extraordinary Session	24–25 February 2025	2 days	
10th Plenary Session	19–23 May 2025	5 days	
11th Plenary Session	21–14 October 2025	4 days	
2nd Extraordinary Session	24 November 2025	1 day	
12th Plenary Session	26 December 2025	1 day	
13th Plenary Session	5 January	1 day	

== Apparatus heads ==
Institution	Name	Akson Lao	Gender	Took office	Left office	Tenure
Administrative Office	Thongsalith Mangnomek	ທອງສະລິດ ມັງໜໍ່ເມກ	Male	15 January 2021	Incumbent	5 years and 211 days
Defense and Public Security Commission	Thongloun Sisoulith	ທອງລຸນ ສີສຸລິດ	Male	15 January 2021	Incumbent	5 years and 211 days
External Relations Committee	Sounthone Xayachack	ສູນທອນ ໄຊຍະຈັກ	Female	15 January 2021	29 March 2021	73 days
External Relations Committee	Thongsavanh Phomvihane	ຫວັນ ພົມວິຫານ	Male	29 March 2021	Incumbent	5 years and 211 days
Inspection Commission	Khamphanh Phommathat	ຄໍາພັນ ພົມມະທັດ	Male	15 January 2021	Incumbent	5 years and 211 days
Organisation Commission	Chansy Phosikham	ຈັນສີ ໂພສີຄຳ	Male	15 January 2021	2 February 2021	18 days
Organisation Commission	Sisay Leudetmounsone	ສີໃສ ລືເດດມູນສອນ	Female	2 February 2021	Incumbent	5 years and 211 days
National Institute of Politics and Public Administration	Phouvong Ounkhamsaen	ພູວົງ ອຸ່ນຄໍາແສນ	Male	15 January 2021	Incumbent	5 years and 211 days
Propaganda and Training Committee	Khamphanh Phommathat	ຄໍາພັນ ພົມມະທັດ	Male	15 January 2021	4 February 2021	20 days
Propaganda and Training Committee	Khamphanh Pheuyavong	ຄໍາພັນ ເຜີຍຍະວົງ	Male	4 February 2021	Incumbent	5 years and 191 days

== Members ==
=== Members ===
Rank	Name	Akson Lao	Level of governance (Office upon election)	10th CC		12th CC		Gender
Rank	Name	Akson Lao	Level of governance (Office upon election)	Change	Rank	Change	Rank	Gender
1	Thongloun Sisoulith	ທອງລຸນ ສີສຸລິດ	Central: General Secretary of the LPRP Central Committee; Prime Minister of Laos	Member	2	Member	1	Male
2	Phankham Viphavanh	ພັນຄໍາ ວິພາວັນ	Central: Vice President of Laos	Member	6	Nonmember	—	Male
3	Pany Yathotou	ປານີ ຢາທໍ່ຕູ້	Central President of the National Assembly	Member	3	Nonmember	—	Female
4	Bounthong Chitmany	ບຸນທອງ ຈິດມະນີ	Central: Standing Member of the LPRP Central Committee's Secretariat; Deputy Prime Minister of Laos	Member	4	Nonmember	—	Male
5	Xaysomphone Phomvihane	ໄຊສົມພອນ ພົມວິຫານ	Central: President of the Lao Front for National Construction's Central Committee	Member	9	Member	2	Male
6	Chansamone Chanyalath	ຈັນສະໝອນ ຈັນຍາລາດ	Central: Minister of National Defence	Member	13	Nonmember	—	Male
7	Khamphanh Phommathat	ຄໍາພັນ ພົມມະທັດ	Central: Chairman of the LPRP Central Committee's Inspection Commission	Member	16	Member	4	Male
8	Sinlavong Khoutphaythoune	ສິນລະວົງ ຄຸດໄພທູນ	Municipal: Secretary of the LPRP Vientiane Municipal Committee	Member	15	Nonmember	—	Male
9	Sonexay Siphandone	ສອນໄຊ ສີພັນດອນ	Central: Deputy Prime Minister of Laos	Member	18	Member	3	Male
10	Kikeo Khaykhamphithoune	ກິແກ້ວ ໄຂຄໍາພິທູນ	Central: Minister of Information, Culture and Tourism	Member	21	Member	5	Male
11	Vilay Lakhamfong	ວິໄລ ຫຼ້າຄໍາຟອງ	Central: Minister of Public Security	Member	40	Member	6	Male
12	Sisay Leudetmounsone	ສີໃສ ລືເດດມູນສອນ	Central: Vice President of the National Assembly	Member	20	Member	7	Female
13	Saleumxay Kommasith	ສະເຫຼີມໄຊ ກົມມະສິດ	Central: Minister of Foreign Affairs	Member	50	Member	8	Male
14	Khamphanh Pheuyavong	ຄໍາພັນ ເຜີຍຍະວົງ	Provincial: Secretary of the LPRP Oudomxay Provincial Committee; Governor of Oudomxay	Member	60	Member	9	Male
15	Anouphab Tounalom	ພາບ ຕຸນາລົມ	Provincial: President of the Vientiane People's Council	Member	63	Member	10	Male
16	Thongsalith Mangnomek	ທອງສະລິດ ມັງໜໍ່ເມກ	Central: Head of the LPRP Central Committee's Administrative Office	Member	55	Member	11	Male
17	Sounthone Xayachack	ສູນທອນ ໄຊຍະຈັກ	Central: Head of the LPRP Central Committee's External Relations Commission; Deputy Minister of Foreign Affairs	Member	38	Member	12	Female
18	Viengthong Siphandone	ວຽງທອງ ສີພັນດອນ	Central: President of the State Audit Organisation	Member	48	Member	13	Female
19	Chaleun Yiapaoher	ຈະເລີນ ເຢຍປາວເຮີ	Central: Minister of the Office of the Prime Minister	Member	12	Nonmember	—	Male
20	Khambay Damlath	ຄໍາໃບ ດໍາລັດ	Central: Vice President of the Lao Front for National Construction's Central Committee	Member	22	Nonmember	—	Male
21	Sommad Pholsena	ສົມມາດ ພົນເສນາ	Central: Minister of Natural Resources and Environment	Member	23	Nonmember	—	Male
22	Khampheng Saysompheng	ຄໍາແພງ ໄຊສົມແພງ	Central: Minister of Labour and Social Welfare	Member	29	Nonmember	—	Male
23	Souvone Leuangbounmy	ສຸວອນ ເລືອງບຸນມີ	Central: Deputy Minister of National Defence; Chief of Staff of the Lao People's Armed Forces	Member	30	Nonmember	—	Male
24	Khamjane Vongphosy	ຄໍາເຈນ ວົງໂພສີ	Central: Head and Minister of the Administrative Office in the Prime Minister's Office	Member	33	Nonmember	—	Male
25	Khamphanh Sitthidampha	ຄໍາພັນ ສິດທິດໍາພາ	Provincial: Governor of Vientiane	Member	36	Nonmember	—	Male
26	Khampheuy Bouddavieng	ຄໍາເຜີຍ ບຸດດາວຽງ	Central: Vice President of the Lao Front for National Construction's Central Committee	Member	37	Nonmember	—	Male
27	Thongloy Silivong	ທອງລອຍ ສິລິວົງ	Central: Deputy Minister of National Defence; Director of the Lao People's Armed Forces' General Department	Member	39	Nonmember	—	Male
28	Kongkeo Xaysongkham	ກອງແກ້ວ ໄຊສົງຄາມ	Central: Governor of Borikhamxay	Member	43	Member	14	Male
29	Inlavanh Keobounphanh	ອິນລາວັນ ແກ້ວບຸນພັນ	Central: President, Lao Women's Union's Central Committee	Member	44	Nonmember	—	Female
30	Khamkhan Chanthavisouk	ຄໍາຂັນ ຈັນທະວີສຸກ	Central: Governor of Luang Prabang Province	Member	45	Nonmember	—	Male
31	Khemmani Pholsena	ເຂັມມະນີ ພົນເສນາ	Central: Minister of Industry and Commerce	Member	46	Nonmember	—	Female
32	Boviengkham Vongdara	ບໍ່ວຽງຄໍາ ວົງດາລາ	Central: Minister of Science and Technology	Member	47	Nonmember	—	Male
33	Sonethanou Thammavong	ສອນທະນູ ທໍາມະວົງ	Central: President of the National Economic and Social Science Institute	Member	49	Member	15	Male
34	Vilayvong Bouddakham	ວິໄລວົງ ບຸດດາຄໍາ	Provincial: Governor of Champassak	Member	52	Member	16	Male
35	Phet Phomphiphak	ເພັດ ພົມພິພັກ	Central: Minister of Agriculture and Forestry	Member	58	Member	17	Male
36	Phongsavanh Sitthavong	ພົງສະຫວັນ ສິດທະວົງ	Provincial: Governor of Xayaboury	Member	59	Nonmember	—	Male
37	Vanxay Phengxoumma	ວັນໄຊ ແພງຊຸມມາ	Provincial: Governor of Huaphan	Member	67	Nonmember	—	Male
38	Santiphab Phomvihane	ສັນຕິພາບ ພົມວິຫານ	Provincial: Governor of Savannakhet	Member	69	Member	18	Male
39	Bounkham Vorachit	ບຸນຄໍາ ວໍລະຈິດ	Central: Deputy Minister of Natural Resources and Environment	Alternate	70	Member	19	Female
40	Buakhong Nammavong	ບົວຄົງ ນາມມະວົງ	Provincial: Governor of Bokeo	Alternate	71	Member	20	Male
41	Sonexay Sitphaxay	ສອນໄຊ ສິດພະໄຊ	Central: Governor of the Central Bank	Alternate	72	Nonmember	—	Male
42	Baykham Khattiya	ໃບຄໍາ ຂັດຕິຍະ	Central: Deputy Minister of Labour and Social Welfare	Alternate	73	Member	21	Female
43	Alounxay Sounnalath	ອາລຸນໄຊ ສູນນະລາດ	Central: General Secretary of the Lao People's Revolutionary Youth Union's Central Committee	Alternate	74	Member	22	Male
44	Suanesavanh Vignaket	ສວນສະຫວັນ ວິຍະເກດ	Central: Head of the National Assembly's Secretariat	Alternate	75	Member	23	Female
45	Phoxay Sayasone	ໂພໄຊ ໄຊຍະສອນ	Provincial: Governor of Saravan	Alternate	76	Member	24	Male
46	Laopaoxong Navongxay	ລາວປາວຊົ່ງ ນະວົງໄຊ	Central: Vice President of the National Economic and Social Science Institute	Alternate	77	Member	25	Male
47	Let Xayaphone	ເລັດ ໄຊຍະ ພອນ	Provincial: Governor of Attapeu	Nonmember	—	Nonmember	—	Male
48	Khamlieng Outhakaysone	ຄໍາລຽງ ອຸທະໄກສອນ	Provincial: Governor of Xaysomboun	Nonmember	—	Member	26	Male
49	Bounchom Oubonpaseuth	ບຸນໂຈມ ອຸບົນປະເສີດ	Central: Deputy Minister of Finance	Nonmember	—	Member	27	Male
50	Khamphoy Vannasane	ຄໍາຜອຍ ວັນນະສານ	Provincial: Governor of Phongsaly	Nonmember	—	Member	28	Male
51	Leklay Sivilay	ເຫຼັກໄຫຼ ສີວິໄລ	Provincial: Governor of Xekong	Nonmember	—	Member	29	Male
52	Viengsavath Siphandone	ວຽງສະຫວັດ ສີພັນດອນ	Central: Deputy Minister of Public Works and Transport	Nonmember	—	Nonmember	—	Male
53	Khamlay Sipaseuth	ສີປະ ເສີດ	Provincial: Governor of Luang Namtha	Nonmember	—	Member	30	Male
54	Phouth Simmalavong	ພຸດ ສີມມາລາວົງ	Central: Deputy Minister of Education and Sports	Nonmember	—	Nonmember	—	Male
55	Vanxay Phongsavanh	ພອງສະຫວັນ	Provincial: Governor of Khammuan	Nonmember	—	Member	31	Male
56	Bounfeng Phoummalaysith	ບຸນແຝງ ພູມມະໄລສິດ	Central: Deputy Minister of Health	Nonmember	—	Nonmember	—	Male
57	Aly Vongnorbountham	ອາລີ ວົງໜໍ່ບຸນທໍາ	Central: President Federation of Trade Unions' Central Committee	Nonmember	—	Member	32	Female
58	Phayvy Sybualypha	ໄພວີ ສີບົວລິພາ	Central: Deputy Minister of Justice	Nonmember	—	Member	33	Male
59	Phouvong Ounkhamsaen	ພູວົງ ອຸ່ນຄໍາແສນ	Central: Head of the National Institute of Politics and Public Administration	Nonmember	—	Member	34	Male
60	Thongchanh Manixay	ທອງຈັນ ມະນີໄຊ	Central: Minister of Home Affairs	Nonmember	—	Nonmember	—	Male
61	Bounchanh Sivongphanh	ບຸນຈັນ ສີວົງພັນ	Provincial: Deputy Governor of Xieng Khuang	Nonmember	—	Member	35	Male
62	Thongsavanh Phomvihane	ທອງສະຫວັນ ພົມວິຫານ	Central: Deputy Minister of Foreign Affairs	Nonmember	—	Member	36	Male
63	Xaysana Khotphouthone	ໄຊຊະນະ ໂຄດພູທອນ	Central: Deputy Head, People's Supreme Prosecutor	Nonmember	—	Member	37	Male
64	Atsaphangthong Siphandone	ອາດສະພັງທອງ ສີພັນດອນ	Municipal: Vice Mayor of Vientiane	Nonmember	—	Member	38	Male
65	Leeber Leebouapao	ລີເບີ ລີບົວປາວ	Central: Chairman of the National Assembly's Planning, Finance and Audit Committee	Nonmember	—	Member	39	Male
66	Boutsady Thanameuang	ບຸດສະດີ ທະນະເມືອງ	Central: Director-General of the Civil Servant Management Department; Head of the LPRP Central Committee's Personnel and Organisation Commission	Nonmember	—	Member	40	Female
67	Kongthong Phongvichit	ກົງທອງ ພົງວິຈິດ	Central: Deputy Minister of Public Security	Nonmember	—	Nonmember	—	Male
68	Vongkham Phommakone	ວົງຄໍາ ພົມມະກອນ	Central: Director-General, General Logistics Department of the Ministry of National Defence	Nonmember	—	Nonmember	—	Male
69	Pingkham Lasasimma	ປີ່ງຄໍາ ລາຊະສິມມາ	Central: Vice Chairwoman of the National Assembly's Economic, Technology and Environment Committee	Nonmember	—	Member	41	Female
70	Vanthong Kongmany	ວັນທອງ ກອງມະນີ	Central: Director-General of the General Political Department of the Ministry of Public Security	Nonmember	—	Member	42	Male
71	Daovong Phonekeo	ດາວວົງ ພອນແກ້ວ	Central: Deputy Minister of Energy and Mines	Nonmember	—	Member	43	Male

=== Alternates ===
Rank	Name	Akson Lao	10th CC	12th CC		Gender
Rank	Name	Akson Lao	10th CC	Change	Rank	Gender
1	Malaythong Kommasith	ມະໄລທອງ ກົມມະສິດ	Nonmember	Member	44	Male
2	Bounkhong Lachiemphone	ບຸນຄົງ ຫຼ້າຈຽມພອນ	Nonmember	Member	45	Male
3	Vansy Kuamua	ວັນສີ ກົວມົວ	Nonmember	Member	46	Male
4	Vilayvanh Bouddakham	ວິໄລວັນ ບຸດດາຄໍາ	Nonmember	Member	47	Male
5	Linkham Douangsavanh	ລິນຄໍາ ດວງສະຫວັນ	Nonmember	Member	48	Male
6	Viengthavisone Thephachanh	ວຽງທະວີສອນ ເທບພະຈັນ	Nonmember	Member	49	Male
7	Monxay Laomuaxong	ມອນໄຊ ລາວມົວຊົ່ງ	Nonmember	Member	50	Male
8	Bounta Thepphavong	ບຸນຕາ ເທບພະວົງ	Nonmember	Nonmember	—	Male
9	Amphaivone Lombounpheng	ອໍາໄພວອນ ລ້ອມບູນແພງ	Nonmember	Member	51	Female
10	Lyvong Laoly	ລີວົງ ລາວລີ	Nonmember	Member	52	Female
