= Phomvihane (surname) =

Phomvihane is a surname. Notable people with the name include:

- Kaysone Phomvihane (1920–1992), Laotian politician and revolutionary
- Santiphab Phomvihane, Laotian politician
- Thongsavanh Phomvihane (born 1964), Laotian politician
- Thongvin Phomvihane (born 1938), Laotian politician
- Xaysomphone Phomvihane (1956–2026), Laotian politician
