= First Lady of Laos =

Unofficial title usually referring to the wife of the President of Laos

- Incumbent; Naly Sisoulith since 22 March 2021
- Residence: Presidential Palace, Laos

The First Lady of Lao People's Democratic Republic, more commonly called the First Lady of Laos, is an unofficial title usually referring to the wife of the President of Laos. While unofficial, the title is increasingly utilized in domestic and international protocol events. The title has also been attributed to the wife of the Prime Minister of Laos by some Laotian media outlets. The most prominent and highest position in Laos is the General Secretary of the Lao People's Revolutionary Party and the spouse of the officeholder is considered the authentic First Lady of Laos.

The present first lady of Laos is Naly Sisoulith, wife of Thongloun Sisoulith, who has held the role since 2021.

== List of first ladies ==
No.	Portrait	Name (Birth-Death)	Term of office			President m.
No.	Portrait	Name (Birth-Death)	Took office	Left office	Time in office	President m.
1		Nguyen Thi Ky Nam (1910–2003)	2 December 1975	29 October 1986	10 years, 331 days	Souphanouvong m.1938
–		Khamsouk Vongvichit (1908–1999); Acting	29 October 1986	15 August 1991	4 years, 290 days	Phoumi Vongvichit
2		Thongvin Phomvihane (born 1938)	15 August 1991	21 November 1992	1 year, 98 days	Kaysone Phomvihane
3		Bounema Phoumsavanh	25 November 1992	24 February 1998	5 years, 91 days	Nouhak Phoumsavanh m.1944
4		Thongvanh Siphandone	24 February 1998	8 June 2006	8 years, 104 days	Khamtai Siphandone
5		Keosaychay Sayasone (1958–2021)	8 June 2006	20 April 2016	9 years, 317 days	Choummaly Sayasone m.1993
6		Khammeung Vorachit (born 1940)	20 April 2016	22 March 2021	4 years, 336 days	Bounnhang Vorachit
7		Naly Sisoulith (born 1947)	22 March 2021	Incumbent	5 years, 169 days	Thongloun Sisoulith
