= 10th Politburo of the Lao People's Revolutionary Party =

The 10th Politburo of the Lao People's Revolutionary Party (LPRP), officially the Political Bureau of the 10th Central Committee of the Lao People's Revolutionary Party, was elected in 2016 by the 1st Plenary Session of the 10th Central Committee, in the immediate aftermath of the 10th National Congress.

7th-ranked member Saysomphone Phomvihane is the son of former LPRP General Secretary Kaysone Phomvihane, whose successor Khamtai Siphandone is father of 11th-ranked Sonexay Siphandone; both men were reelected to the 11th Politburo of the Lao People's Revolutionary Party and rank 5th and 9th, serving as head of the legislature and head of government.

== Members ==
Rank	Name	Akson Lao	9th POL	11th POL	Birth	Gender
1	Bounnhang Vorachit	ບຸນຍັງ ວໍລະຈິດ	Old	Retired	1937	Male
2	Thongloun Sisoulith	ທອງລຸນ ສີສຸລິດ	Old	Reelected	1945	Male
3	Pany Yathotou	ປານີ ຢາທໍ່ຕູ້	Old	Reelected	1951	Female
4	Bounthong Chitmany	ບຸນທອງ ຈິດມະນີ	Old	Reelected	1949	Male
5	Phankham Viphavanh	ພັນຄໍາ ວິພາວັນ	Old	Reelected	1951	Male
6	Chansy Phosikham	ຈັນສີ ໂພສີຄຳ	New	Retired	1948	Male
7	Saysomphone Phomvihane	ໄຊສົມພອນ ພົມວິຫານ	New	Reelected	1946	Male
8	Chansamone Chanyalath	ຈັນສະໝອນ ຈັນຍາລາດ	New	Reelected	1955	Male
9	Khamphan Phommathat	ຄໍາພັນ ພົມມະທັດ	New	Reelected	1954	Male
10	Sinlavong Khoutphaythoune	ສິນລະວົງ ຄຸດໄພທູນ	New	Reelected	1953	Male
11	Sonexay Siphandone	ສອນໄຊ ສີພັນດອນ	New	Reelected	1966	Male
