= Somsavat Lengsavad =

Laotian politician

- 凌绪光
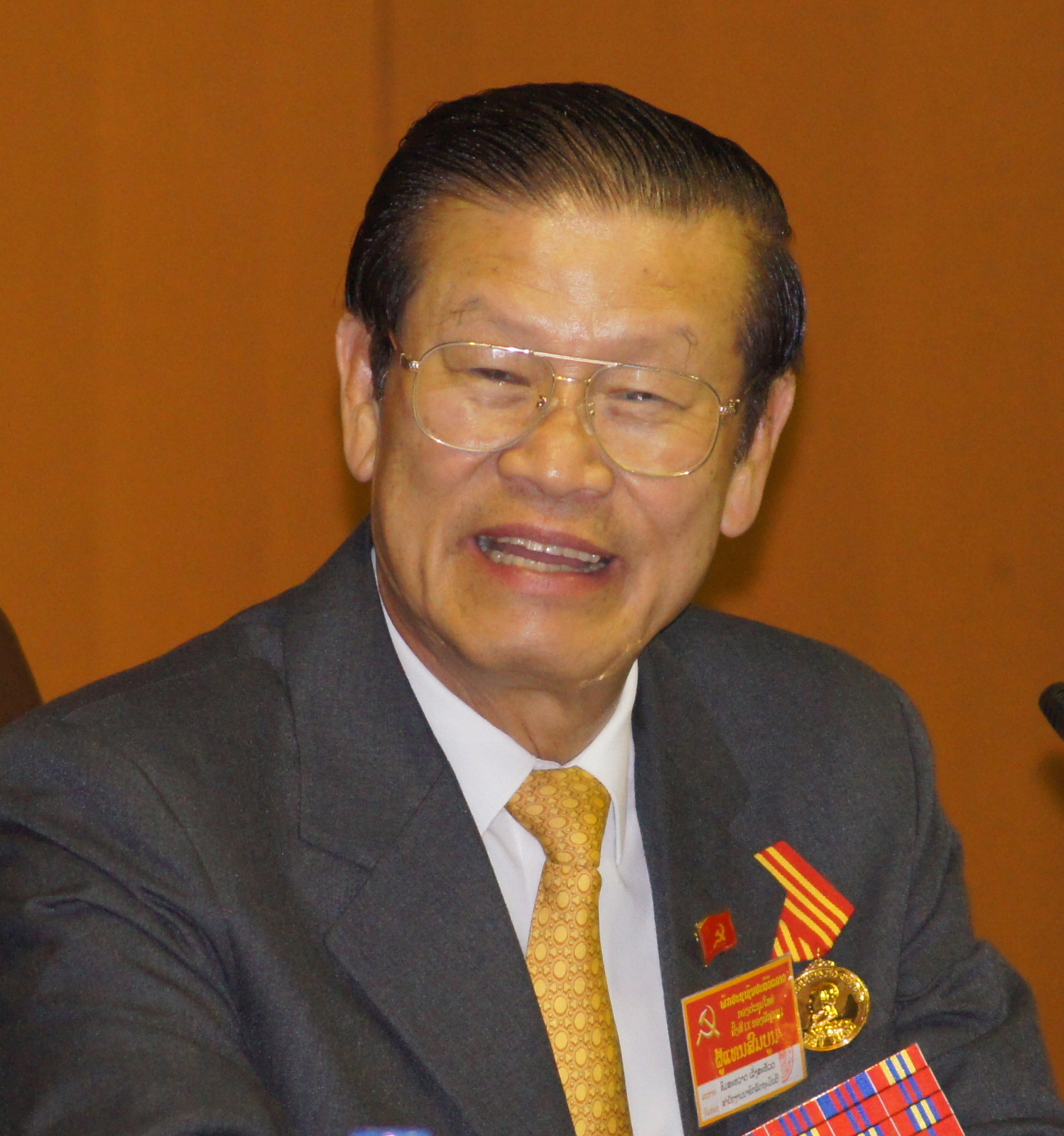
- Lengsavad in 2011

Deputy Prime Minister of Laos
- In office 27 March 2001 – 20 April 2016
- Prime Minister: Thongsing Thammavong; Bouasone Bouphavanh; Bounnhang Vorachith

Minister of Foreign Affairs
- In office 25 February 1993 – 8 June 2006
- Prime Minister: Bounnhang Vorachith; Sisavath Keobounphanh; Khamtai Siphandon
- Preceded by: Phoun Sipaseut
- Succeeded by: Thongloun Sisoulith

Personal details
- Born: 15 June 1945 Luang Prabang, Laos
- Party: Lao People's Revolutionary Party
- Occupation: Politician

Somsavat Lengsavad (Lao: ສົມສະຫວາດ ເລັ່ງສະຫວັດ; born 15 June 1945) is a former Deputy Prime Minister of Laos. An ethnic Chinese, Chinese name: 凌绪光 (Lin Xuguang), who hails from Luang Prabang with ancestry from Hainan, he was a protégé of Kaysone Phomvihane.

In 1961 he joined the Lao People's Revolutionary Party and fought in the Laotian Civil War.

He became foreign minister in 1993 and served until 8 June 2006, when he was replaced by Thongloun Sisoulith.

Besides his native Lao, he is fluent in Standard Chinese and Vietnamese.
