= Phoun Sipaseuth =

Laotian politician (1920–1994)

- ພູນ ສີປະເສີດ

Deputy Prime Minister of Laos
- In office 2 December 1975 – 25 February 1993 Serving with Nouhak Phoumsavan, Phoumi Vongvichit and Khamtai Siphandon
- Prime Minister: Kaysone Phomvihane; Khamtai Siphandon

Minister of Foreign Affairs
- In office 2 December 1975 – 25 February 1993
- Prime Minister: Kaysone Phomvihane
- Preceded by: Phoumi Vongvichit (Royal Lao Government)
- Succeeded by: Somsavat Lengsavad

Personal details
- Born: 16 February 1920
- Died: 8 December 1994 (aged 74) Vientiane, Laos
- Party: Lao People's Revolutionary Party
- Occupation: Politician

Phoun Sipaseuth (Lao: ພູນ ສີປະເສີດ; 16 February 1920 – 8 December 1994) was a Laotian politician and member of the Lao People's Revolutionary Party (LPRP). He served as Deputy Chairman of the Council of Ministers and Ministers of Foreign Affairs during the 1980s.

He was elected to the LPP Central Committee at the 1st National Congress and retained his seat until the 5th National Congress. At the 3rd National Congress he was elected to the LPRP Politburo.
