= Xaysomphone Phomvihane =

Laotian politician (1956–2026)

- ໄຊສົມພອນ ພົມວິຫານ
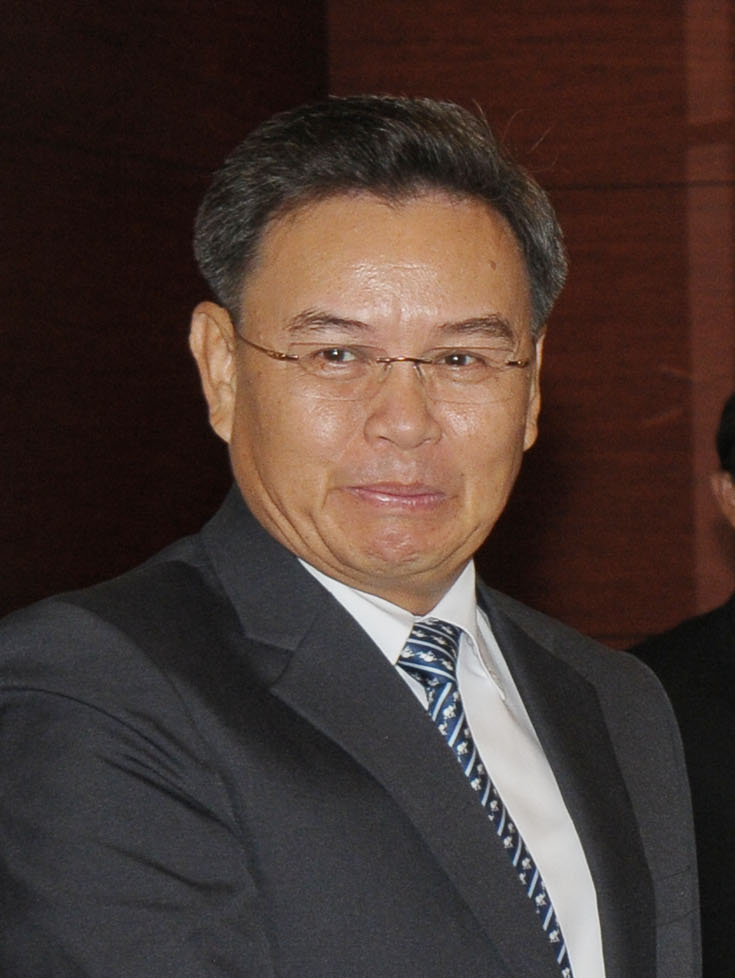
- Xaysomphone in 2015

President of the National Assembly of Laos
- In office 22 March 2021 – 8 August 2026
- Preceded by: Pany Yathotou
- Succeeded by: Sounthone Xayachack (acting); Sonexay Siphandone

Chairman of the Central Committee of the Lao Front for National Construction
- In office 2016 – 15 March 2021
- Preceded by: Phandoungchit Vongsa
- Succeeded by: Sinlavong Khoutphaitoun

Minister of Finance
- In office 1995 – 24 February 1998
- Prime Minister: Khamtai Siphandon
- Preceded by: Khamsay Souphanouvong
- Succeeded by: Khamphoui Keoboualapha

Personal details
- Born: 12 December 1956 Viengxay, Houaphanh, Laos
- Died: 8 August 2026 (aged 69)
- Party: Lao People's Revolutionary Party
- Spouse: Viphavan Phomvihane
- Children: 2
- Parent(s): Kaysone (father); Thongvin (mother)
- Relatives: Santiphab (brother); Thongsavanh (brother)
- Occupation: Politician

Xaysomphone Phomvihane (Lao: ໄຊສົມພອນ ພົມວິຫານ; 12 December 1956 – 8 August 2026) was a Laotian politician who was president of the National Assembly of Laos from 2021 until his death in 2026. The son of former Lao People's Revolutionary Party (LPRP) General Secretary Kaysone Phomvihane and Thongvin Phomvihane, he joined the LPRP in 1984 and started his political career in the Savannakhet provincial party office. He was elected to the LPRP Central Committee at the 5th National Congress in 1991.

== Early life and education ==
Xaysomphone Phomvihane was born on 12 December 1956 in Na Mao Village, Viengxay District, in the Houaphanh province. His parents were Kaysone Phomvihane and Thongvin Phomvihane; Kaysone was a revolutionary and founding member of the Lao People's Revolutionary Party (LPRP) and served as its first secretary general as well as the de-facto leader of Laos from 1975 until his death in 1992. Through his father, Xaysomphone has Vietnamese ancestry. Xaysomphone was his parents' eldest son and had five siblings, including Minister of Foreign Affairs Thongsavanh Phomvihane, Minister of Finance Santiphab Phomvihane, and Major General Sanyahak Phomvihane (died 2013).

He attended primary and secondary school in Vietnam and China, before returning to Laos to attend the Military School in Houaphanh province from 1974 to 1976. From 1976 to 1973, he attended Moscow State University in the then–Soviet Union, before returning to Laos in 1983, spending a year as an instructor at the National Academy of Politics and Public Administration. He attended the 67 School in Nanning, China and earnt a doctorate in political sciences from the Soviet Academy of Sciences.

== Political career ==
Xaysomphene joined the LPRD in 1984 and began his political career in 1987 at the Savannakhet provincial party office. In 1989 he became deputy governor, focusing on economic relationships with foreign countries. At the 5th National Congress of the Lao People's Revolutionary Party in 1991, Xaysomphene was elected to the LPRP Central Committee; at the time, he was the Committee's youngest member. Two years later, in 1993, he became governor of Savannakhet province.

In 1995, Xaysomphene left the governorship and became the Minister of Finance of Laos. In addition, he led Lao delegations at World Bank and International Monetary Fund meetings. During his tenure, the overseeing of business privatization was transferred from the Planning Committee to his ministry, increasing his power in the country. At the beginning of the 4th Government of Laos, in 1998, he was made the minister in charge at the Office of the Prime Minister. In 2002, he was elected to National Assembly and in 2006, at the 8th National Congress, he became part of the 6th Standing Committee and was elected as the Assembly's vice president.

At the beginning of 10th Politburo in 2016, Xaysomphene was promoted to rank seven in the Politiburo and made president of the Lao Front for National Development. His promotion was part of the generational transition between Pathet Lao revolutionaries in government leadership to the subsequent generation of political leaders. There, he was involved in disaster relief, including after Tropical Storm Sonca in 2017. He remained in the role until 2021 at the 11th National Congress, when he rose to rank five and was elected president of the National Assembly for the 11th Politburo, succeeding Pany Yathotou. He stayed president through the March 2026 elections of 12th Politburo, though there was speculation that he might become the country's prime minister. At the congress, he was promoted to rank two. Xaysomphene died later that year, still in office.

Xaysomphene was known to be pro-Vietnamese, politically, and in his roles helped facilitate high-level official visits, coordination between respective legislative forums, and exchanges in multiple fields such as education, culture and lawmaking between the two countries. He was the president of the ASEAN Inter-Parliamentary Assembly in 2023 and 2024 and led Laos delegations abroad.

== Personal life and death ==
Xaysomphene was married to Viphavanh Phomvihane; the couple had two children.

Xaysomphone died on 8 August 2026, at the age of 69, due to an inflammatory vascular disease. The LDPR and the Laotian government announced five days of national mourning following his death and Vietnam announced two days of national mourning. The day after Phomvihane's death, Vietnamese politician and then–Chairman of the National Assembly of Vietnam Trần Thanh Mẫn led a delegation from the Communist Party of Vietnam to pay their respects.

A state funeral for Xaysomphone was held on 12 August at the That Luang esplanade; a eulogy was delivered by Thongloun Sisoulith.
