= Santiphab Phomvihane =

Laotian politician

- ສັນຕິພາບ ພົມວິຫານ
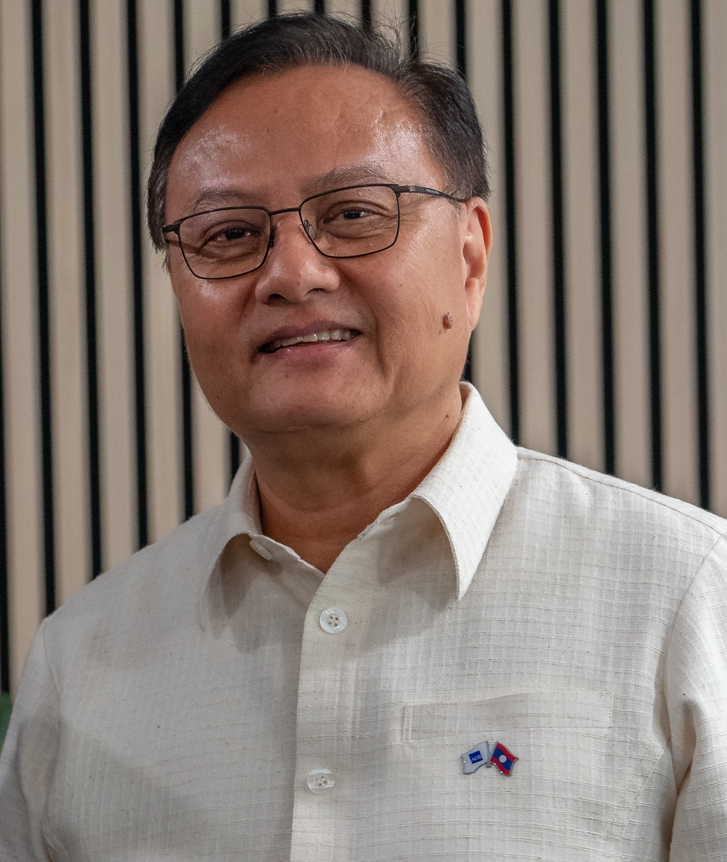
- Phomvihane in 2026

Deputy Prime Minister
- Incumbent
- Assumed office 23 March 2026 Serving with Khamphan Phommathat, Thongsalith Mangnormek, Khamlieng Outhakaysone and Thongsavanh Phomvihane
- Prime Minister: Sonexay Siphandone; Saleumxay Kommasith

Minister of Finance
- Incumbent
- Assumed office 30 January 2023
- Prime Minister: Sonexay Siphandone; Saleumxay Kommasith
- Preceded by: Bounchom Oubonpaserth

Personal details
- Party: Lao People's Revolutionary Party
- Parent(s): Kaysone (father); Thongvin (mother)
- Relatives: Thongsavanh (brother); Xaysomphone (brother)

Santiphab Phomvihane (Lao: ສັນຕິພາບ ພົມວິຫານ) is a Laotian politician who has served as Minister of Finance since 30 January 2023. He has also served as Deputy Prime Minister of Laos since 23 March 2026.

He was previously the governor of Savannakhet province from 2016 to 2023.

== Early life ==
Santiphab is the son of former president and Lao People's Revolutionary Party (LPRP) leader Kaysone Phomvihane and his wife Thongvin. Through his father, he has Vietnamese ancestry. His brothers include Xaysomphone, who served as president of the National Assembly of Laos from 2021 until his death in 2026, Thongsavanh, who serves as Minister of Foreign Affairs, and Major General Sanyahak, who served as deputy defense minister before his death in 2013.

== Career ==
Santiphab served as deputy director-general of the Lao Customs Department in 2000 and later as its director-general.

By January 2012, Santiphab was serving as deputy minister of finance, a position he held until his appointment as deputy governor of Savannakhet province on 5 June 2015. In 2016, he succeeded Souphanh Keomixay as governor when Keomixay was appointed Minister of Planning and Investment in the 8th Government of Laos.

Santiphab served as governor until being appointed Minister of Finance on 30 January 2023. He was unanimously elected secretary of the Ministry of Finance's LPRP executive committee in November 2025.

On 23 March 2026, Santiphab was one of six ministers appointed Deputy Prime Minister. In June 2026, Santiphab said that the government was seeking to facilitate customs clearance and promote industrial development along the China–Laos Railway.
