= Thongsavanh Phomvihane =

Laotian politician

- ທອງສະຫວັນ ພົມວິຫານ
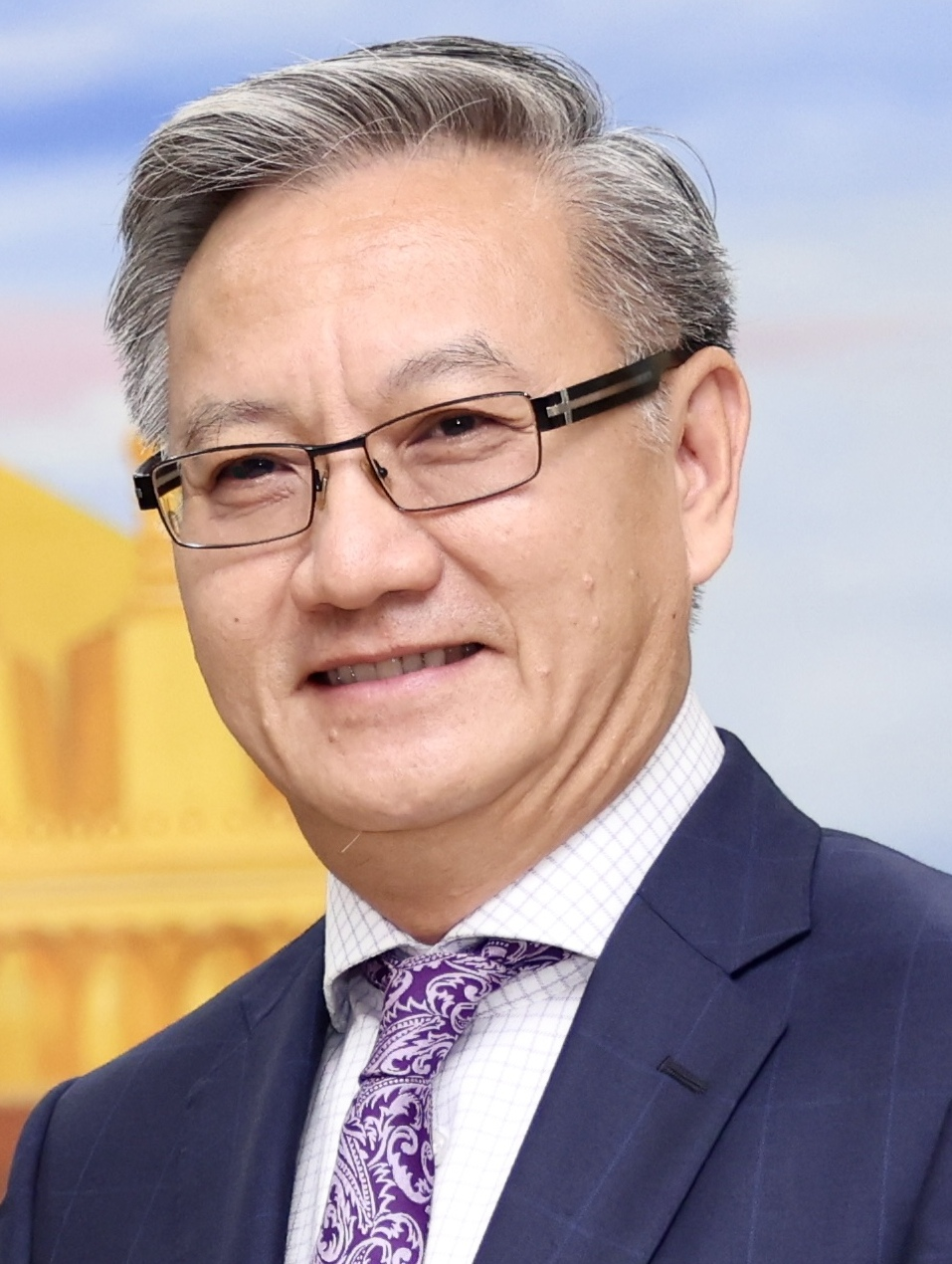
- Phomvihane in 2023

Deputy Prime Minister
- Incumbent
- Assumed office 23 March 2026 Serving with Khamphan Phommathat, Thongsalith Mangnormek, Khamlieng Outhakaysone and Santiphab Phomvihane
- Prime Minister: Sonexay Siphandone; Saleumxay Kommasith
- General Secretary: Thongloun Sisoulith

Minister of Foreign Affairs
- Incumbent
- Assumed office 18 November 2024
- Prime Minister: Sonexay Siphandone; Saleumxay Kommasith
- Preceded by: Saleumxay Kommasith

Head of the LPRP Central Committee External Relations Committee

11th term
- In office 29 March 2021 – 2024
- Preceded by: Sounthone Xayachack
- Succeeded by: Bounleua Phandanouvong (acting)

Personal details
- Born: 9 August 1964 (age 62) Kingdom of Laos
- Party: Lao People's Revolutionary Party
- Spouse: Vadsana Phomvihane
- Parent(s): Kaysone (father); Thongvin (mother)
- Relatives: Santiphab (brother); Xaysomphone (brother)
- Education: Moscow State Institute of International Relations
- Occupation: Politician

Thongsavanh Phomvihane (Lao: ທອງສະຫວັນ ພົມວິຫານ; born 9 August 1964) is a Laotian politician and member of the Lao People's Revolutionary Party (LPRP). He currently serves as the Minister of Foreign Affairs of Laos since November 2024 and as Deputy Prime Minister of Laos since 23 March 2026.

He previously was the Head of the LPRP Central Committee External Relations Committee.

== Early life ==
Phomvihane is the son of former party General Secretary of the Central Committee Kaysone Phomvihane and Central Committee member Thongvin Phomvihane. He graduated from the Moscow State Institute of International Relations in 1987.

== Career ==
He has worked in the Ministry of Foreign Affairs since 1991. He was appointed Deputy Director General of the International Organizations Department in 1993, and served as Acting Director General of the International Organizations Department in 1993–95. He began working on China–Laos relations in the late 1990s as Political Counsellor and Deputy Head of Mission of the Embassy to China. His first political office came in 2003 when he was appointed Ambassador to Russia, and was officially accredited ambassador to Belarus, Ukraine and Kazakhstan as well. In 2009 he started working in the party's External Relations Committee, and was appointed Deputy Head of the External Relations Committee in 2012 and served until 2015 when he was transferred to the Ministry of Foreign Affairs as Deputy Minister of Foreign Affairs. Later in June 2015 he was appointed Ambassador to Vietnam and served until 2019 when he was yet again appointed Deputy Minister of Foreign Affairs. Two years later, in 2021, he was appointed Head of the party's External Relations Committee. In November 2024, he was appointed Foreign Minister, succeeding Saleumxay Kommasith.

== Personal life ==
He has three brothers; Xaysomphone, Santiphab and Sanyahak. He is fluent in English and Russian.

== Bibliography ==
Books:

- Stuart-Fox, Martin (2008). Historical Dictionary of Laos. Scarecrow Press. ISBN 978-0-81086-411-5.
