= 12th Politburo of the Lao People's Revolutionary Party =

The 12th electoral term of the Politburo (12th Politburo) of the Central Committee of the Lao People's Revolutionary Party (LPRP) is composed of 13. It was elected by the 1st Plenary Session of the 12th Central Committee on 8 January 2026.

== Members ==
Members of the 12th Politburo of the Lao People's Revolutionary Party
Listing	Name	11th	Birth	Gender	Ref.
1	Thongloun Sisoulith	Member	1945	Male	
2	Xaysomphone Phomvihane	Member	1956	Male	
3	Sonexay Siphandone	Member	1966	Male	
4	Khamphanh Phommathat	Member	1955	Male	
5	Kikeo Khaykhamphithoune	Member	1957	Male	
6	Vilay Lakhamfong	Member	1958	Male	
7	Sisay Leudetmounsone	Member	1958	Female	
8	Saleumxay Kommasith	Member	1968	Male	
9	Khamphanh Pheuyavong	Nonmember	1957	Male	
10	Thongsalith Mangnomek	Nonmember	1958	Male	
11	Phet Phomphiphak	Nonmember		Male	
12	Khamlieng Outhakaysone	Nonmember		Male	
13	Vanxay Phongsavanh	Nonmember		Male	
