= 11th Politburo of the Lao People's Revolutionary Party =

The 11th Politburo of the Lao People's Revolutionary Party, officially the Political Bureau of the 11th Central Committee of the Lao People's Revolutionary Party, was elected at the 1st Plenary Session of the 11th Central Committee in the immediate aftermath of the 11th National Congress in 2021.

== Members ==
Rank	Name	Akson Lao	10th POL	12th POL	Born	Gender
1	Thongloun Sisoulith	ທອງລຸນ ສີສຸລິດ	Member	Member	1945	Male
2	Phankham Viphavanh	ພັນຄໍາ ວິພາວັນ	Member	Nonmember	1951	Male
3	Pany Yathotou	ປານີ ຢາທໍ່ຕູ້	Member	Nonmember	1951	Female
4	Bounthong Chitmany	ບຸນທອງ ຈິດມະນີ	Member	Nonmember	1949	Male
5	Xaysomphone Phomvihane	ໄຊສົມພອນ ພົມວິຫານ	Member	Member	1954	Male
6	Chansamone Chanyalath	ຈັນສະໝອນ ຈັນຍາລາດ	Member	Nonmember	1946	Male
7	Khamphanh Phommathat	ຄໍາພັນ ພົມມະທັດ	Member	Member	1955	Male
8	Sinlavong Khoutphaythoune	ສິນລະວົງ ຄຸດໄພທູນ	Member	Nonmember	1953	Male
9	Sonexay Siphandone	ສອນໄຊ ສີພັນດອນ	Member	Member	1966	Male
10	Kikeo Khaykhamphithoune	ກິແກ້ວ ໄຂຄໍາພິທູນ	Nonmember	Member	1957	Male
11	Vilay Lakhamfong	ວິໄລ ຫຼ້າຄໍາຟອງ	Nonmember	Member	19?	Male
12	Sisay Leudetmounsone	ສີໃສ ລືເດດມູນສອນ	Nonmember	Member	1959	Female
13	Saleumxay Kommasith	ສະເຫຼີມໄຊ ກົມມະສິດ	Nonmember	Member	1968	Male
