= Thongvin Phomvihane =

Laotian politician

Thongvin Phomvihane (Lao: ທອງວິນ ພົມວິຫານ; born 7 January 1938 in Viang Chan) is a Laotian politician and member of the Lao People's Revolutionary Party (LPRP). She is the widow of LPRP General Secretary Kaysone Phomvihane and mother to Xaysomphone, Thongsavanh Phomvihane and Santiphab Phomvihane. From 1988 to 1993 she served as the General Secretary of the Central Committee of the Lao People's Revolutionary Youth Union.

She was elected to the LPRP Central Committee at the 3rd National Congress and retained her seat until the 5th National Congress.
