= Thongsouk Saysangkhi =

Thongsouk Saysangkhi (sometimes transliterated as Thongsouk Saysangkhy; 4 July 1938 – February 1998) was a political prisoner and a former Vice Minister of Science and Technology in the Lao People's Revolutionary Party, a communist political party that has governed Laos since 1975.

Born in 1938 in Pakse (then a part of the French protectorate of Laos within French Indochina), Saysangkhi earned a secondary education degree in mathematics in 1960, attended a public works engineering school in Laos, and then studied law and economic science in Paris from 1964 to 1965. After returning, he became chief of the Communication and Transport Service of the Royal Government of Laos (RLG). At the same time, however, he is said to have "participated in the revolution" on behalf of the opposition Lao People's Revolutionary Party, which was then locked in a civil war with the RLG. It is believed that he worked as an "underground" activist, opposing the RLG from within its ranks. Just before the LPRP came to power, he became the RLG's Director General of Public Works. After the LPRP assumed power in 1975 and established the Lao People's Democratic Republic (LPDR), he worked as the Director for Materials and Equipment in the Ministry of Public Works and Transport until 1981, when he was appointed to be Director General of the LPDR Representation at the Vietnamese port of Da Nang. In 1982, he returned to Laos to become Acting Minister of Equipment in the LPDR cabinet. He remained in this post until 1985, when he became Vice Minister of Communications, Transportation and Post. In 1990, a few months before his resignation from the LPRP and arrest, he became Vice Minister of Science and Technology, a post which he also resigned along with his party membership.

Near the end of summer in 1990, he was arrested after resigning from the Government and the party and calling for political and economic change. Also arrested with him were Latsami Khamphoui (born 28 May 1940 in Pakse) and Feng Sakchittapong (born 2 August 1940 in Khong District). All three were held without trial for two years, before being sentenced to 14 years' imprisonment.

In his resignation letter to Kaysone Phomvihan, then the general secretary of the party's central executive committee and head of state, Thongsouk Saysangkhi said, "I oppose the dictatorial power of personal cliques, which are precisely what the Party and the State apparat are; and I am demanding the holding of free elections, the putting into practice of popular liberties and democracy, and the existence of democratic institutions opposed to the maintenance of a system of communist feudalism and Politburo dynastism. ... The history of humankind has now confirmed that a single-party system relying exclusively on coercion and deception is incapable of ever bringing prosperity and happiness to our people."

According to Amnesty International, Thongsouk Saysangkhi is believed to have either died in Xam Khe prison around 3 kilometres (1.9 mi) from Vientiane, or in Forced Labour Camp No 7 in Houaphanh Province in February 1998. Amnesty says it was alerted to the poor prison conditions and Thongsouk Saysangkhi's poor state of health, but was told by Lao authorities that all three were well.
