= Kaysone Phomvihane Museum =

- Location: Vientiane, Laos
- Coordinates: 18.0067°N 102.6443°E
- Type: museum

Kaysone Phomvihane Museum is a memorial named after the first leader of the Lao People's Revolutionary Party. It opened on December 13, 1995, and is located in Vientiane.
