= Keosaychay Sayasone =

First Lady of Laos (2006-2016)

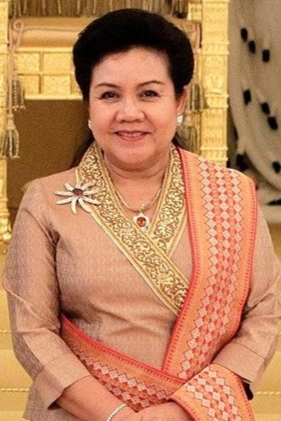
- Sayasone in 2011

Spouse of the Paramount Leader of Laos
- In role 21 March 2006 – 22 January 2016
- General Secretary: Choummaly Sayasone
- Preceded by: Thongvanh Siphandone
- Succeeded by: Khammeung Vorachit

First Lady of Laos
- In role 8 June 2006 – 20 April 2016
- President: Choummaly Sayasone
- Preceded by: Thongvanh Siphandone
- Succeeded by: Khammeung Vorachit

Second Lady of Laos
- In role 27 March 2001 – 8 June 2006
- Vice President: Choummaly Sayasone
- Succeeded by: Khammeung Vorachit

Personal details
- Born: 11 September 1958 Sepone District, Laos
- Died: 4 April 2021 (aged 62) Nam Ngum Reservoir, Laos
- Cause of death: by drowning
- Spouse: Choummaly Sayasone (m. 1993)

Keosaychay Sayasone (11 September 1958 – 4 April 2021) was the wife of former Lao president Choummaly Sayasone and the first lady of Laos from 2006 to 2016.

She died on 4 April 2021, by drowning when a yacht she was on capsized in Nam Ngum Lake.
