= Phoumi Vongvichit =

President of Laos (1909–1994)

- ພູມີ ວົງວິຈິດ
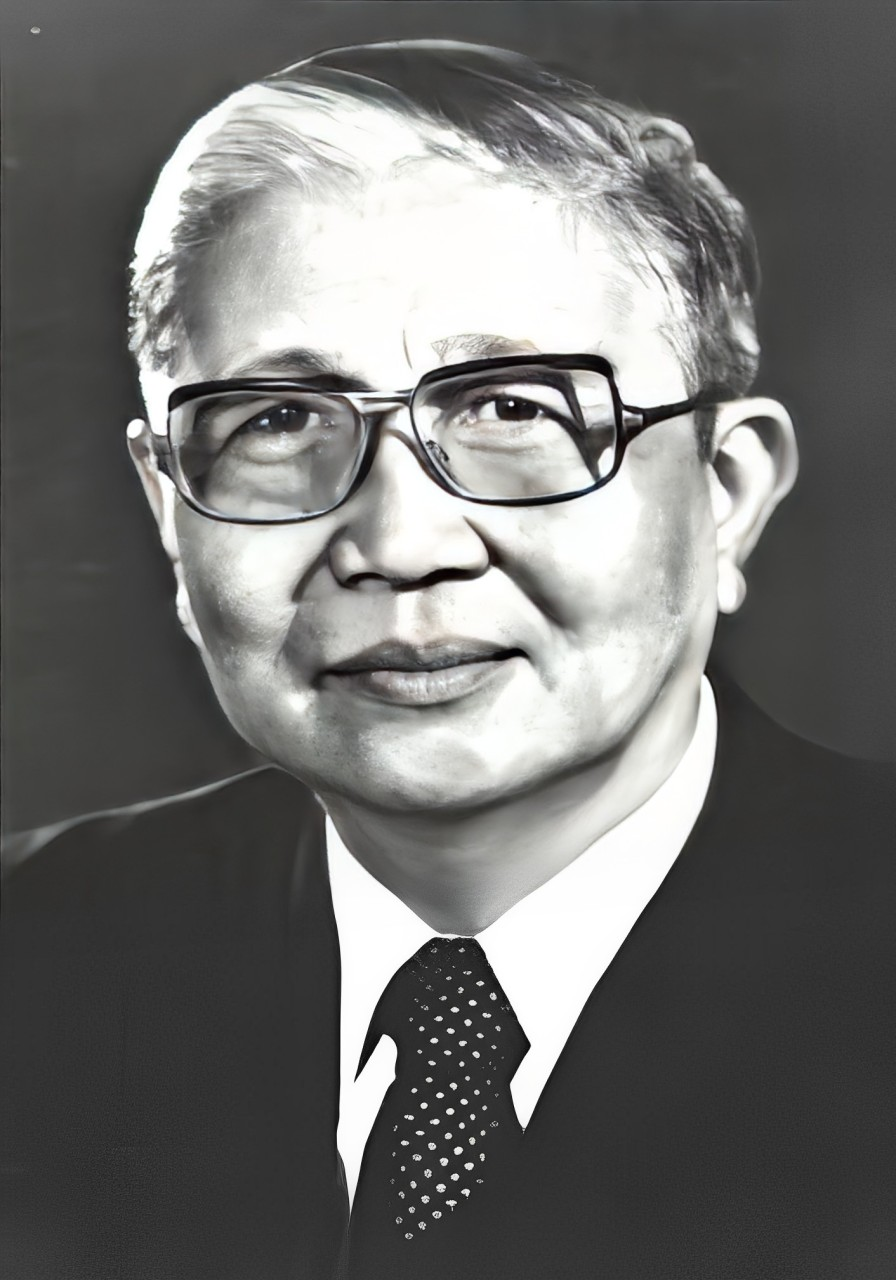
- Vongvichit c. 1950s

President of Laos Acting
- In office 29 October 1986 – 15 August 1991
- Prime Minister: Khamtai Siphandon
- Preceded by: Souphanouvong
- Succeeded by: Kaysone Phomvihane

Deputy Prime Minister of Laos
- In office 2 December 1975 – 1 June 1989 Serving with Nouhak Phoumsavan, Phoun Sipraseuth and Khamtai Siphandon
- Prime Minister: Kaysone Phomvihane
- Preceded by: Himself and Pheng Phongsavanh
- Succeeded by: Phoun Sipraseuth and Khamphouy Keoboualapha
- In office 5 April 1974 – 1 December 1975 Serving with Pheng Phongsavanh
- Prime Minister: Souvanna Phouma
- Succeeded by: Himself, Nouhak Phoumsavan, Phoun Sipraseuth and Khamtai Siphandon (Lao PDR Government)

Minister of Education, Sport, and Religious Affairs
- In office 2 December 1975 – January 1982
- Prime Minister: Kaysone Phomvihane
- Preceded by: Office established
- Succeeded by: Bountiam Pitsamai

Minister of Foreign Affairs
- In office 5 April 1975 – 1 December 1975
- Prime Minister: Souvanna Phouma
- Succeeded by: Phoun Sipraseuth (Lao PDR Government)

Personal details
- Born: 6 April 1909 Xieng Khouang, Laos, French Indochina
- Died: 7 January 1994 (aged 84) Vientiane, Laos
- Resting place: Laotian National Revolutionary Cemetery
- Party: Lao People's Revolutionary Party
- Spouse: Khamsouk Vongvichitr
- Occupation: Politician

Phoumi Vongvichit (Phumi Wongwichit; Lao: ພູມີ ວົງວິຈິດ; 6 April 1909 – 7 January 1994) was a leading figure of the Pathet Lao and an elder statesman of the Lao People's Democratic Republic.

== History ==
=== Early life ===
He was born April 6, 1909, in Xieng Khouang, the son of a civil servant. He was educated in the Lao capital Vientiane, after which he joined the colonial civil service.

=== Political career ===
After postings in Vientiane, Luang Prabang and Xieng Khouang, he was promoted to district chief ("chao muang") and served in Xieng Khouang (1939) and Vientiane (1940 - 1945). In January 1945 he was appointed governor ("chao khoueng") of Houaphan where he remained until the Japanese surrender in August 1945. The following month, Phoumi cooperated with Free French forces when they briefly seized the town of Sam Neua, but subsequently he joined the anti-colonialist Lao Issara movement and worked closely with the Viet Minh to oppose the return of French authority in Indochina.

In 1946, after the French reasserted their authority in Laos, Phoumi made his way to northern Thailand where for the next three years he was active in the Lao Issara. At the end of 1949, having refused to accept the offer of amnesty upon dissolution of the Lao Issara government-in-exile in Thailand, Phoumi was one of the handful of Lao who joined Souphanouvong in northern Vietnam. There he attended the founding congress of the Neo Lao Issara (the Free Laos Front). Phoumi was nominated both Secretary-General of the Front, and Minister of the Interior and Deputy Prime Minister in the Pathet Lao Resistance government that the Front established in opposition to the Royal Lao government in Vientiane. The Resistance government gained no international recognition, but Phoumi nominally retained both positions until the Geneva Agreements of 1954 brought the First Indochina War to an end.

In 1954 and 1955, Phoumi led Pathet Lao delegations in negotiations with the Royal Lao government over reintegration of the provinces of Phong Saly and Houaphan. In March 1955, Phoumi was one of the founding members of the Lao People's Party and was elected to its Political Bureau (Politburo). The following January he was elected to the Central Committee of the Lao Patriotic Front (Neo Lao Hak Xat). In 1956, Phoumi continued to be involved in negotiations over integration which eventuated in the signing of a series of agreements, known as the Vientiane Agreements, the following year. These opened the way for formation of the First Coalition government in which Phoumi served as Minister of Religion and Fine Arts. (The other Pathet Lao minister was Souphanouvong at the Ministry of Economy and Plan.) From this time, Phoumi took a lively interest in the Buddhist Sangha, recognizing its potential as a propaganda organ for opposition to the Americanization of Lao society, but also as a vehicle for the propagation of Lao cultural values.

In the supplementary elections of May 1958, Phoumi was elected to the National Assembly to serve as a deputy for Luang Prabang. In the political crisis that followed the electoral success of the left, Phoumi lost his ministry. In July 1959 he was arrested along with other Pathet Lao deputies, and imprisoned without ever being brought to trial. In a famous May 1960 episode he escaped with Souphanouvong and other leading Pathet Lao prisoners and their guards, and made the long march to the Pathet Lao zone in Xieng Khouang.

After the Battle of Vientiane in December 1960 and the subsequent retreat of Neutralist forces to the Plain of Jars, Phoumi was instrumental in arranging for Pathet Lao-Neutralist collaboration. He led the Pathet Lao delegation to the Geneva Conference on the neutrality of Laos in 1962, and served as Minister of Information, Propaganda and Tourism in the Second Coalition government. In 1964, after a series of political assassinations, Phoumi left Vientiane with other Pathet Lao ministers.

By this time Laos had been dragged into the Vietnam War (Second Indochina War) between the United States and North Vietnam. For the next ten years, Phoumi alternated between living in the limestone caverns of Viengxay and leading various Pathet Lao delegations to international communist gatherings. He retained his positions in both the Politburo and the Lao Patriotic Front, and took a leading role in negotiations leading to formation of the Third Coalition government in 1974, in which he served as Deputy Prime Minister and Minister of Foreign Affairs.

After formation of the Lao People's Democratic Republic in December 1975, Phoumi was named Second Deputy Prime Minister and Minister of Education, Sport and Religious Affairs. In the reorganization that followed the Third Congress of the LPRP in 1982, Phoumi became a member of the Inner Cabinet with overall responsibility for education, information and culture. In 1986, when Souphanouvong was forced to step down from the Presidency for reasons of health, Phoumi was named Acting President of the LPDR and Chairman of the Lao Front for National Construction. He retired from the Acting Presidency and the Politburo at the Fifth Party Congress in March 1991.

=== Death ===
From 1991 until his death in 1994, he and Prince Souphanouvong, Sisomphon Lovansay were Advisors of Party's Central Committee.

== Selected bibliography ==
- Phoumi Vongvichit: Laos and the victorious struggle of the Lao people against U.S. neo-colonialism, Neo Lao Haksat Publications, 1969

Political offices
Preceded by Souphanouvong	President of Laos; Acting; 1986 – 1991	Succeeded by Kaysone Phomvihane
Party political offices
Preceded by Souphanouvong	President of the Lao Front for National Construction; 1986 – 1991	Succeeded by Khamtai Siphandon
