= Deputy Prime Minister of Laos =

Deputy head of government of Laos

Deputy Prime Minister of the Lao People's Democratic Republic
- ຮອງນາຍົກລັດຖະມົນຕີລາວ
- Incumbent; Khamphan Phommathat, Thongsalith Mangnormek, Khamlieng Outhakaysone, Santiphab Phomvihane and Thongsavanh Phomvihane since 23 March 2026
- Government of Laos
- Member of: National Assembly
- Reports to: National Assembly; Prime Minister of Laos
- Appointer: National Assembly (nominated by the President); on the advice of the prime minister
- Inaugural holder: Nouhak Phoumsavan; Phoumi Vongvichit; Phoun Sipraseuth; Khamtai Siphandon
- Formation: 2 December 1975 (50 years ago)

The deputy prime minister of the Lao People's Democratic Republic is the deputy chief executive and the rank below the prime minister. The office of deputy prime minister was officially created as a ministerial portfolio on 2 December 1975. A deputy prime minister is appointed on the orders of the sitting prime minister.

== Officeholders ==
Officeholder	Took office	Left office	Duration
Nouhak Phoumsavan	2 December 1975	15 August 1991	15 years, 256 days
Phoumi Vongvichit	2 December 1975	1 June 1989	13 years, 185 days
Phoun Sipraseuth	2 December 1975	25 February 1993	17 years, 85 days
Khamtay Siphandon	2 December 1975	15 August 1991	15 years, 256 days
Sali Vongkhamxao	1982	23 January 1991	9 years, 22 days
Khamphoui Keoboualapha	15 August 1991	6 August 1999	7 years, 356 days
Boungnang Volachit	25 February 1993	27 March 2001	8 years, 30 days
Somsavat Lengsavad	25 February 1993	20 April 2016	23 years, 55 days
Choummaly Sayasone	24 February 1998	27 March 2001	3 years, 31 days
Thongloun Sisoulith	27 March 2001	20 April 2016	15 years, 24 days
Asang Laoli	30 September 2002	20 April 2016	13 years, 203 days
Bouasone Bouphavanh	3 October 2003	8 June 2006	3 years, 158 days
Douangchay Phichit	8 June 2006	17 May 2014	7 years, 343 days
Phankham Viphavanh	2014	2016	
Somdy Douangdy	20 April 2016	22 March 2021	4 years, 336 days
Bounthong Chitmany	20 April 2016	22 March 2021	4 years, 336 days
Sonexay Siphandone	20 April 2016	30 December 2022	6 years, 254 days
Kikeo Khaykhamphithoune	22 March 2021	23 March 2026	5 years, 1 day
Chansamone Chanyalath	22 March 2021	23 March 2026	5 years, 1 day
Saleumxay Kommasith	20 June 2022	5 October 2026	4 years, 107 days
Vilay Lakhamfong	20 June 2022	23 March 2026	3 years, 276 days
Khamphan Phommathat	23 March 2026	Incumbent	
Thongsalith Mangnormek	23 March 2026	Incumbent	
Khamlieng Outhakaysone	23 March 2026	Incumbent	
Santiphab Phomvihane	23 March 2026	Incumbent	
Thongsavanh Phomvihane	23 March 2026	Incumbent	
