= Saleumxay Kommasith =

Laotian politician (born 1968)

- ສະເຫລີມໄຊ ກົມມະສິດ
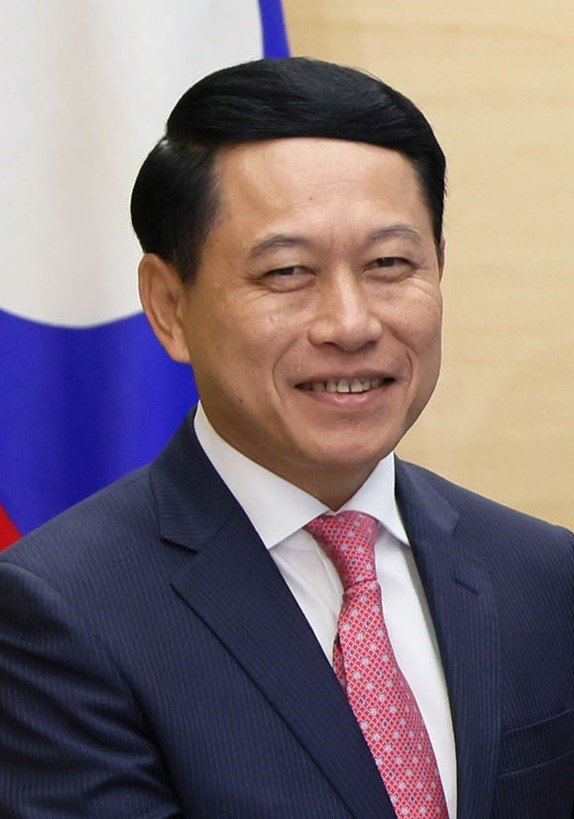
- Kommasith in 2023

20th Prime Minister of Laos
- Incumbent
- Assumed office 5 October 2026
- President: Thongloun Sisoulith
- Deputy: Khamphan Phommathat; Thongsalith Mangnormek; Khamlieng Outhakaysone; Santiphab Phomvihane; Thongsavanh Phomvihane
- Preceded by: Sonexay Siphandone

Deputy Prime Minister of Laos
- In office 20 June 2022 – 5 October 2026
- Prime Minister: Phankham Viphavanh; Sonexay Siphandone

Minister of Foreign Affairs
- In office 20 April 2016 – 18 November 2024
- Prime Minister: Thongloun Sisoulith; Phankham Viphavanh; Sonexay Siphandone
- Preceded by: Thongloun Sisoulith
- Succeeded by: Thongsavanh Phomvihane

Personal details
- Born: October 31, 1968 (age 57) Houaphanh Province, Laos
- Party: Lao People's Revolutionary Party
- Spouse: Alounnee Kommasith
- Children: 2
- Education: Monash University; Moscow State University of International Relations

Saleumxay Kommasith (Lao: ສະເຫຼີມໄຊ ກົມມະສິດ; born 31 October 1968) is a Laotian politician who has served as the Prime Minister of Laos since 5 October 2026. He previously served as a Deputy Prime Minister from 2022 to 2026 and as Minister of Foreign Affairs of Laos from April 2016 to November 2024. He is one of 13 members of 11th and 12th Politburo of the Lao People's Revolutionary Party.

== Life and career ==
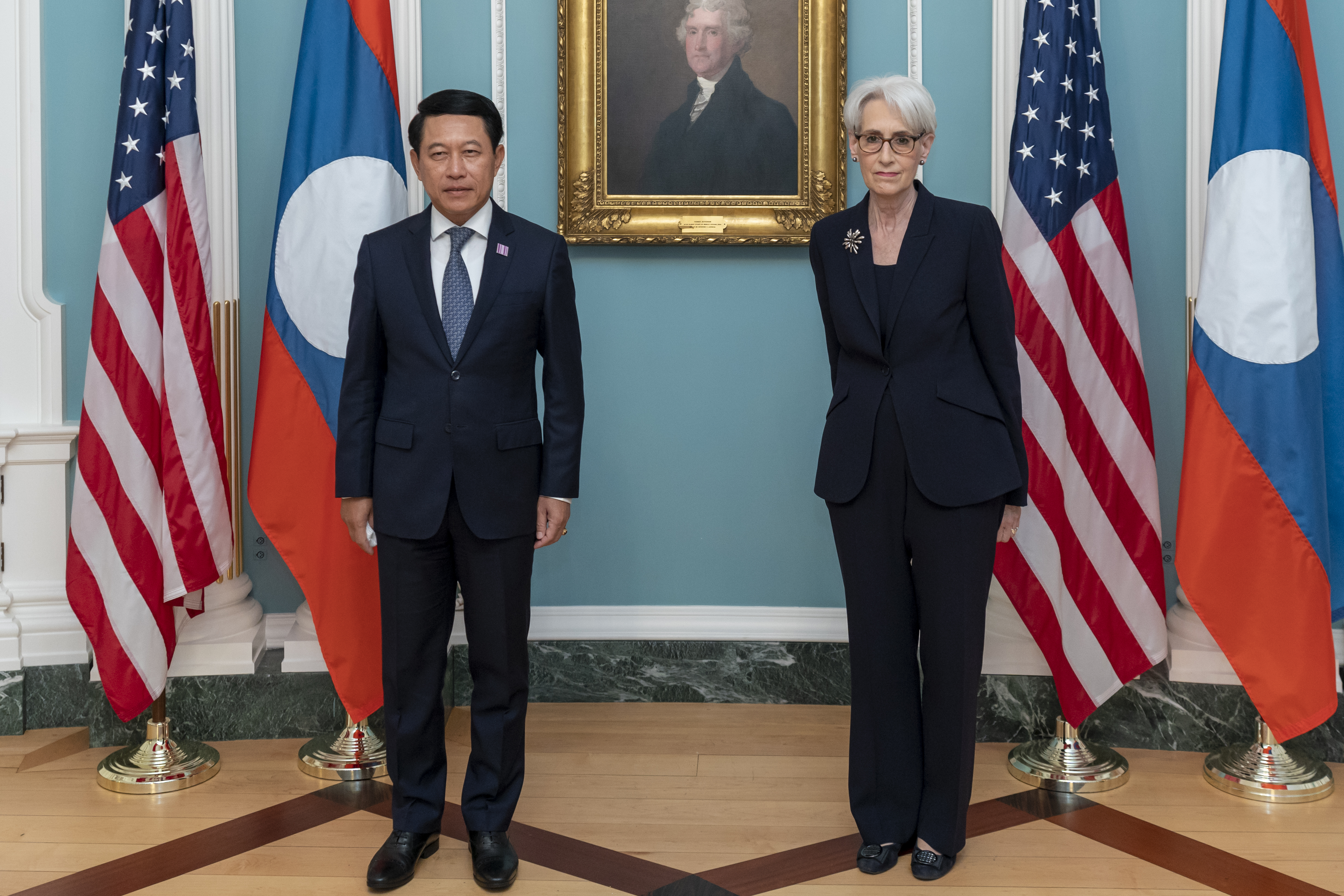
Saleumxay meets with U.S. Deputy Secretary of State Wendy Sherman on May 13, 2022

Saleumxay was born in Houaphan Province, Laos. He gained his MA in International Relations at the Moscow State University of International Relations in Moscow, Russia from 1986 to 1992. He continued his education at Monash University in Australia for another MA in International Study and Development from 1996 to 1997. In addition to Lao, he also speaks Russian, French and English.

Throughout his years in the government, he has an extensive list of appointments. He was Director General of the Department of International Organizations at the Ministry of Foreign Affairs from 2007 to 2011. From 2011 to 2012, he was Assistant Minister of Foreign Affairs. From 2012 to 2013, he served as Permanent Representative of Laos to the United Nations. He was Vice Minister of Foreign Affairs from 2014 to 2016. He was elected as Minister of Foreign Affairs in April 2016. He was reelected as Minister of Foreign Affairs for second term at the 9th National Assembly in March 2021. In June 2022, he was appointed the Deputy Prime Minister. In November 2024, he transferred to Prime Minister's office and was succeeded as Foreign Minister by Thongsavanh Phomvihane.

On 5 October 2026, Kommasith was elected prime minister of Laos.

== Personal life ==
He is married with two daughters. He speaks English, French and Russian. He is a fan of soccer and golf.

== Awards and honors ==
- Order of Friendship (Russia, 2021)

Political offices
Preceded by Sonexay Siphandone	Prime Minister of Laos; 2026–	Incumbent
