= Lao Customs Department =

Lao Customs is the customs service of Laos, with the responsibility of governing and overseeing the flow of goods, people and vehicles into and out of Laos; operating customs offices; and collecting import and export duty fees. The department advises businesses and travelers incountry and participates in regional and international customs-related associations and programs.

== Organization ==
Lao Customs operates regional offices in many towns and cities, including offices located in: Attapeu, Bokeo, Bolikhamsai, Champassack, Huaphanh, Khammuane, Luang Namtha, Luang Prabang, Oudomxay, Phongsaly, Saravanne, Savannnakhet, Sekong, Vientiane Municipality, Vientiane Province, Xayaboury, Xaysomboune Special Zone and Xieng Khouang.
