= Khampheng Saysompheng =

Laotian politician

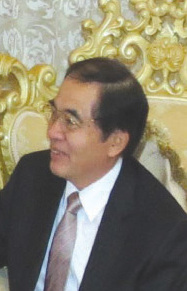
Saysompheng in 2013

Khampheng Saysompheng (Lao: ຄໍາແພງ ໄຊສົມແພງ) is a Laotian politician who served as Minister of Labour and Social Welfare. He has also served as governor of Luang Prabang and Huaphan provinces.

He is the husband of Viengthong Siphandone. and the son-in-law of former leader Khamtai Siphandone.
