= Sonexay Siphandone =

Laotian politician

- ສອນໄຊ ສີພັນດອນ
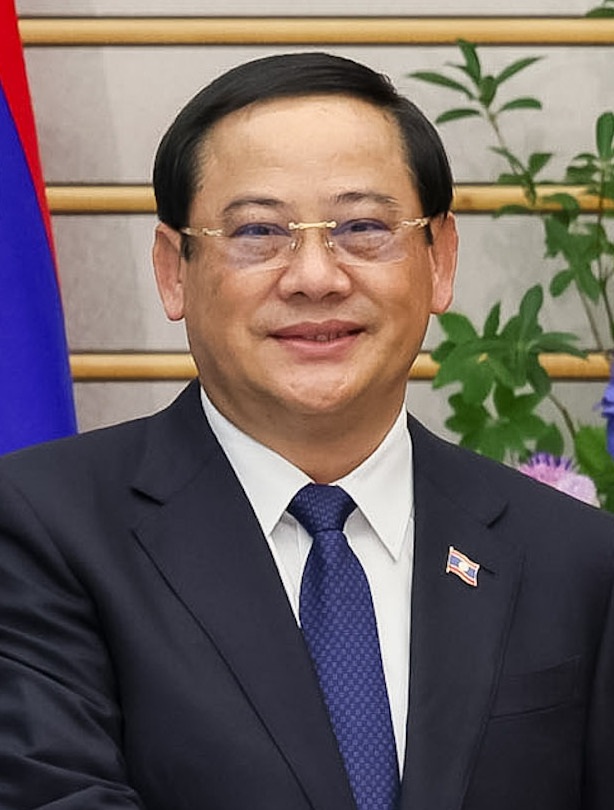
- Sonexay in 2026

President of the National Assembly of Laos
- Incumbent
- Assumed office 5 October 2026
- Preceded by: Xaysomphone Phomvihane; Sounthone Xayachack (acting)

19th Prime Minister of Laos
- In office 30 December 2022 – 5 October 2026
- President: Thongloun Sisoulith
- Preceded by: Phankham Viphavanh
- Succeeded by: Saleumxay Kommasith

Deputy Prime Minister of Laos
- In office 20 April 2016 – 30 December 2022
- Prime Minister: Thongloun Sisoulith

Personal details
- Born: 26 January 1966 (age 60)
- Party: Lao People's Revolutionary Party
- Spouse: Vandala Siphandone
- Parent: Khamtai Siphandone (father)
- Relatives: Viengthong Siphandone (sister); Khampheng Saysompheng (brother-in-law)

Sonexay Siphandone (born 26 January 1966) is a Laotian politician who has served as the president of the National Assembly of Laos since 5 October 2026. A member of the Lao People's Revolutionary Party (LPRP), he previously served as the prime minister of Laos from 30 December 2022 to 5 October 2026 and as the deputy prime minister from 2016 to 2022. He is the son of former LPRP Chairman and former president Khamtai Siphandone.

== Biography ==
Sonexay Siphandone was born on 26 January 1966 in Houaphanh province to Khamtai Siphandone, who served as president of Laos from 1998 and 2006. Siphandone graduated with a bachelor of arts degree at a military academy in Laos and studied political strategy. He was a captain in the Operations Department of the General Staff from 1987 to 1989, and in the Operations Division of the 5th Engineer Division from 1989 to 1990. He worked at the Operations Department of the General Staff from 1990 to 1993. He studied English at the National University of Laos from 1993 to 1998.

Siphandone was a member of the Champasak Provincial Party Committee from 2000 to 2005. In 2005, he was appointed deputy secretary of the provincial party committee and deputy governor of Champasak province. He was a member of the 8th and 9th central committees and the 10th, 11th, and 12th politburos of the Lao People's Revolutionary Party.

Siphandone has held several senior posts in the Lao government and party. He previously served as head of the Prime Minister's Office, minister of planning and investment, and later as deputy prime minister while concurrently holding the planning and investment portfolio. In 2022, he was appointed deputy prime minister responsible for economic affairs.

On 30 December 2022, the Laotian parliament approved Sonexay Siphandone as prime minister of Laos with 149 of 151 members voting in favour. On 5 October 2026, he was elected president of the National Assembly of Laos and succeeded as prime minister by Saleumxay Kommasith.

== Honours ==
- Grand Cordon of the Order of the Rising Sun (2025)

Political offices
Preceded by Phankham Viphavanh	Prime Minister of Laos; 2022–2026	Succeeded by Saleumxay Kommasith
Diplomatic posts
Preceded by Joko Widodo	Chairperson of the ASEAN; 2024	Succeeded by Anwar Ibrahim
