= Lao People's Revolutionary Youth Union =

Communist Youth League in Laos

Lao People's Revolutionary Youth Union ສູນກາງຊາວໜຸ່ມປະຊາຊົນປະຕິວັດລາວ

- Founded: April 14, 1955
- Headquarters: Laos
- Membership: 243,500
- Ideology: Communism; Marxism-Leninism
- Mother party: Lao People's Revolutionary Party
- International affiliation: World Federation of Democratic Youth, WFDY

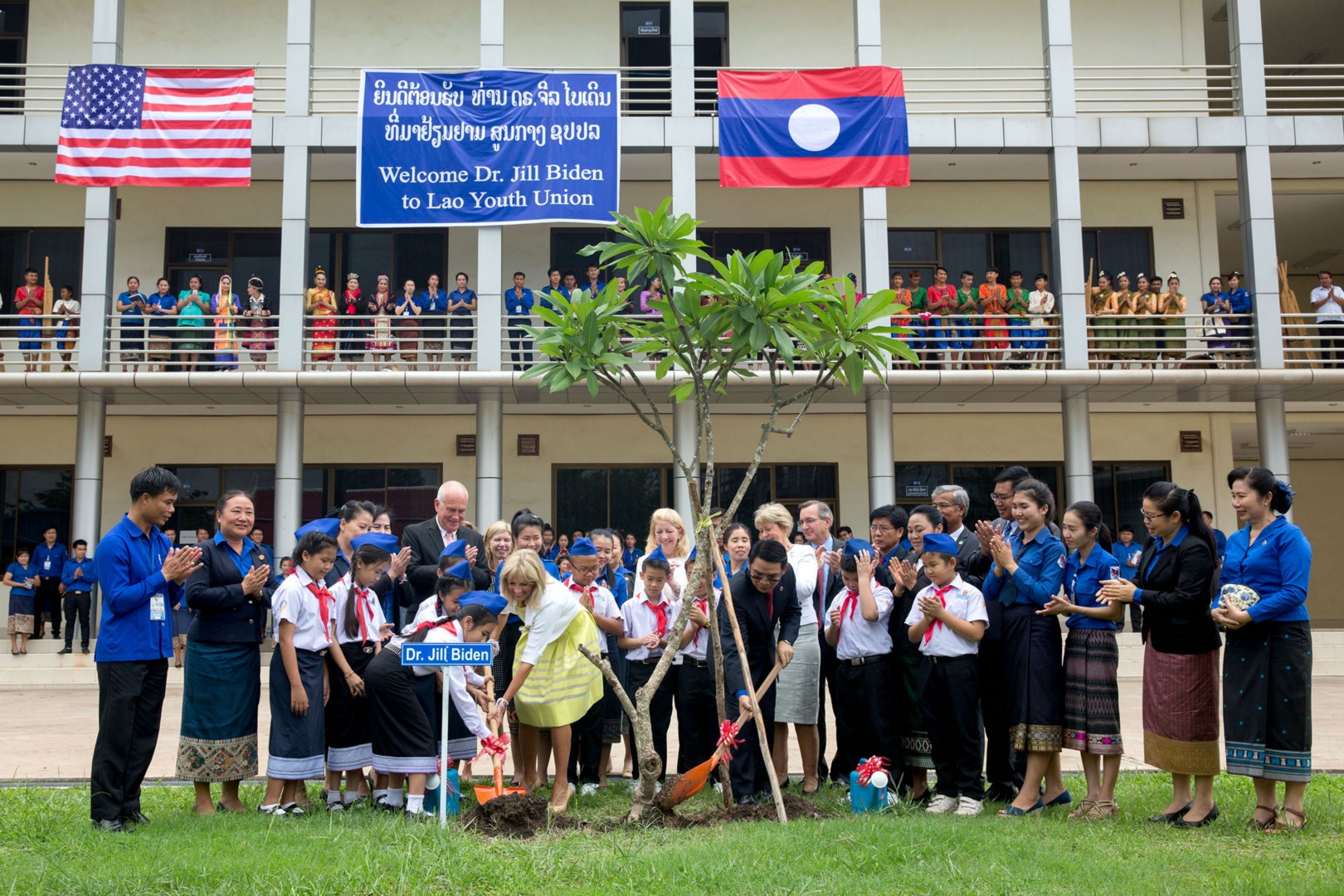
Jill Biden visiting the Lao People's Revolutionary Youth Union in Vientiane in 2015.

The Lao People's Revolutionary Youth Union (Lao: ສູນກາງຊາວໜຸ່ມປະຊາຊົນປະຕິວັດລາວ) is a mass organisation in Laos, dedicated to mobilising young people throughout the country with a view to contributing to national development. It is the youth wing of the Lao People's Revolutionary Party, the ruling party of Laos. The associated pioneer movement is the 2nd December Young Pioneer Brigade.

Originating in 1955 as the Youth Combatant Association and now comprising some 243,500 registered members (aged 15–35), the Lao People's Revolutionary Youth Union has a particular focus on the fields of information, media, entertainment, art and music. The LPRYU operates at central, provincial, municipal, district and village levels and co-operates with foreign countries and international organisations in a wide range of programme activities. LRPYU has a Print and Electronic Media Department which publishes Nok Hien Bin (lit. 'Small Bird') magazine and the Noum Lao newspaper, while also making television and radio programmes for young people.

== See also ==
- Politics of Laos
- History of Laos since 1945
