= Ministry of Foreign Affairs (Laos) =

Government ministry of Laos

- ກະຊວງການຕ່າງປະເທດ; Ministère des affaires étrangères
- Emblem of Laos

Ministry overview
- Formed: 1948; 78 years ago
- Jurisdiction: Government of Laos
- Headquarters: Vientiane Laos
- Minister responsible: Thongsavanh Phomvihane, Minister of Foreign Affairs
- Website: www.mofa.gov.la

The Ministry of Foreign Affairs (Lao: ກະຊວງການຕ່າງປະເທດ, French: Ministère des affaires étrangères) is the government ministry responsible for representing Laos to the international community. The ministry oversees the foreign relations of Laos, maintains diplomatic missions in other countries, and provides visa services.

As of 2025, the Minister of Foreign Affairs is Thongsavanh Phomvihane. The ministry's main offices are located in Vientiane.

== Organization ==
Departments of the ministry include:

- Personnel and Staff Department
- Asia, Pacific and Africa Department
- Europe and America Department
- ASEAN Department
- Economic Affairs Department
- International Organizations Department
- Law and Treaties Department
- Protocol Department
- Press Department
- Consular Department
- Economic Department
- Overseas Lao Affairs Department
- Institute of Foreign Affairs Department
- Diplomatic Service Bureau Department
- The Office of the National Boundary Committee

== e-Visa system ==
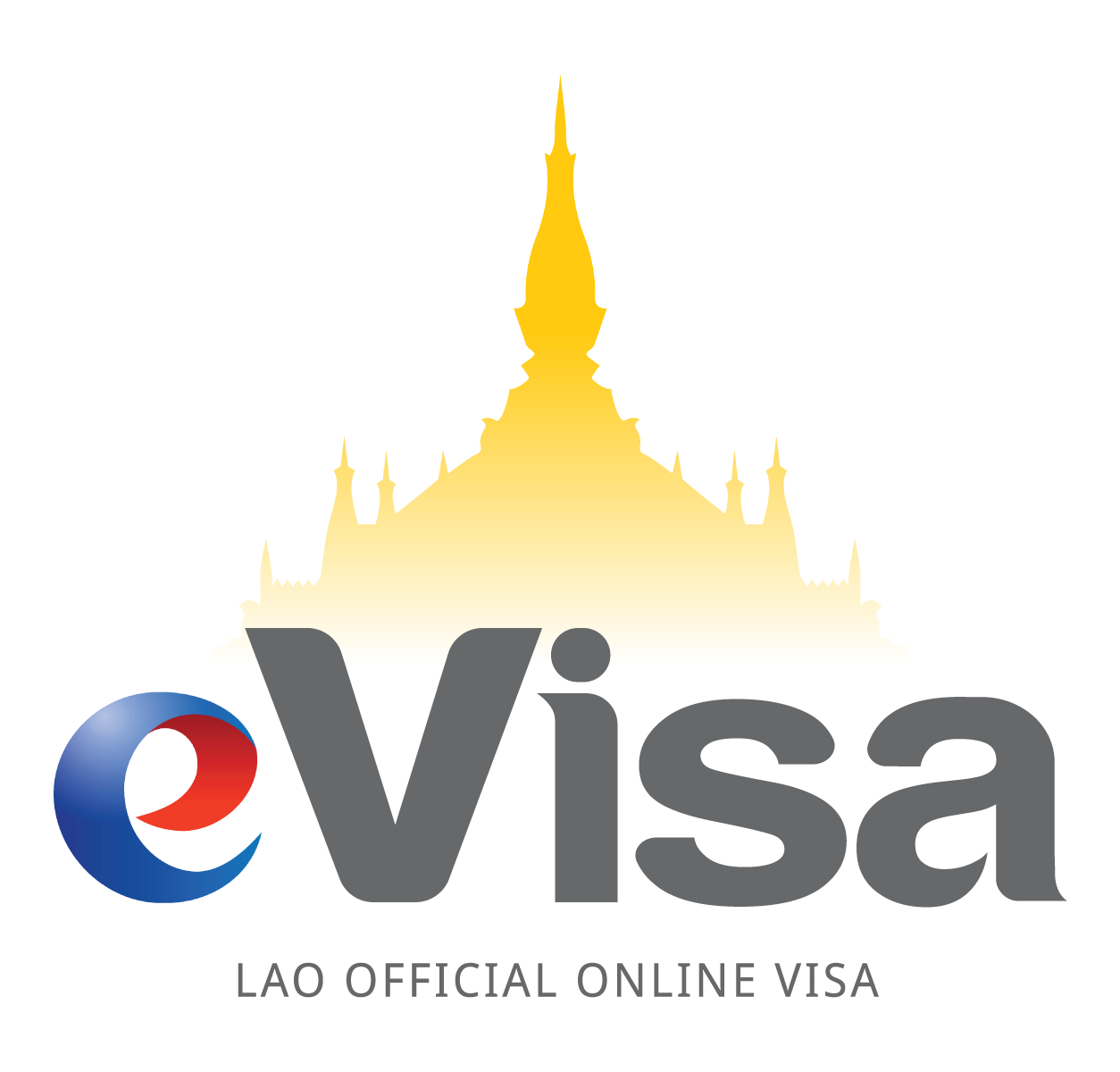
The official Lao e-Visa logo

Since July 2019, an e-Visa system has been launched by the Ministry of Foreign Affairs, which enables visitors to apply for a Laos tourist visa online. Instead of applying through the Laotian Embassy, all that is needed to be done is to complete the online application form and pay with a credit card. After receiving the Visa through email, it should be printed and brought along when traveling to Laos. Tourists can apply for an online visa to Laos at the official website.

== List of ministers ==
Minister of Foreign Affairs
- ລັດຖະມົນຕີກະຊວງການຕ່າງປະເທດ; Ministre des affaires étrangères
- Emblem of Laos

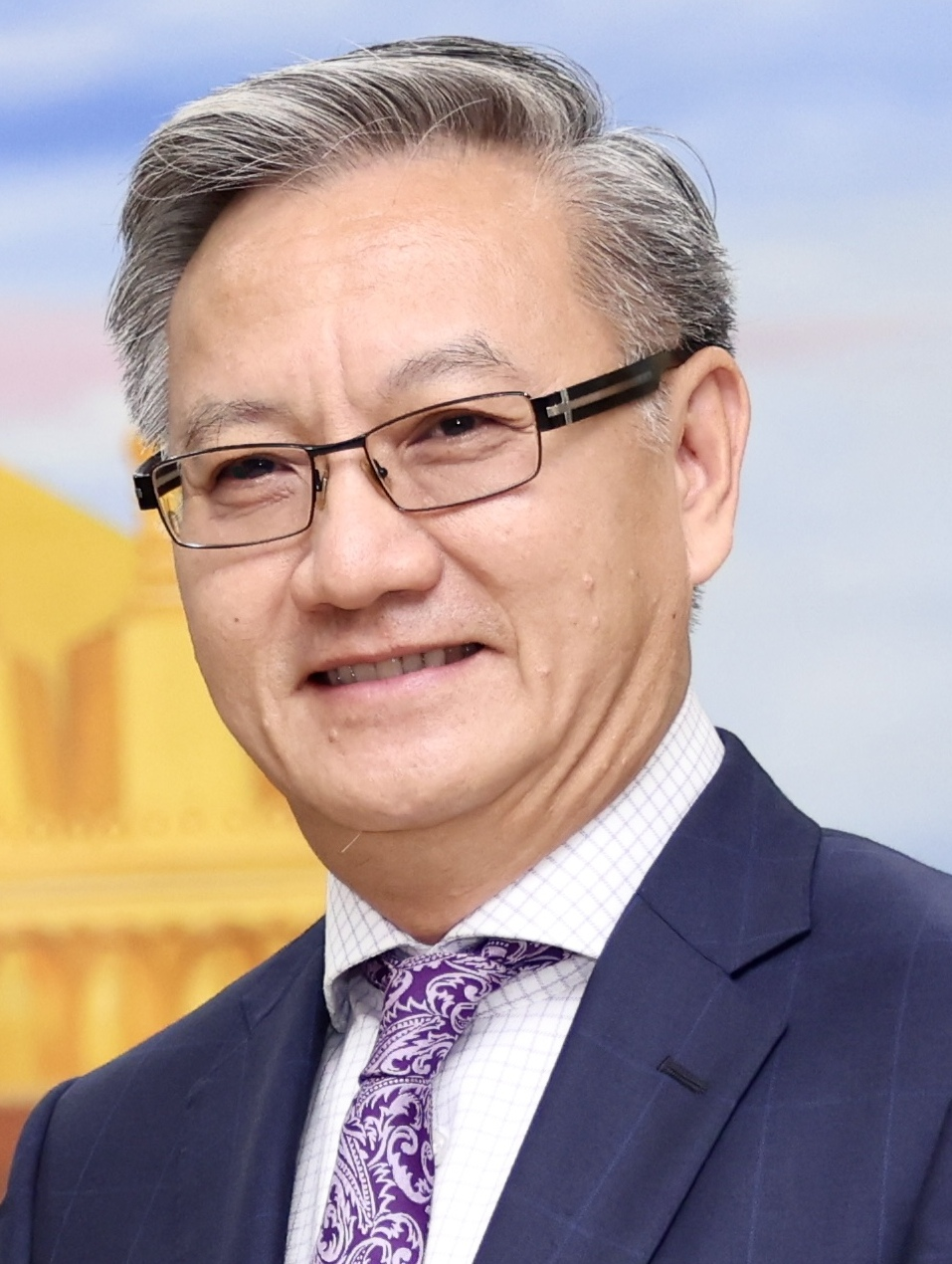
- Incumbent; Thongsavanh Phomvihane since 18 November 2024
- Style: His Excellency
- Member of: Cabinet
- Reports to: The Prime Minister
- Seat: Vientiane
- Nominator: The Prime Minister
- Appointer: Bounnhang Vorachit; The President
- Term length: No fixed term
- Inaugural holder: Prince Boun Oum
- Formation: 1948; 78 years ago

This is a list of ministers of foreign affairs of Laos:

No.	Name (Birth–Death)	Portrait	Tenure
Kingdom of Laos (1947–1975)
1	Prince Boun Oum (1912–1980)		1948–1950
2	Phoui Sananikone (1903–1983)		1950–1951
3	Nhouy Abhay (1909–1963)		1951–1954
(2)	Phoui Sananikone (1903–1983)		1954–1956
4	Prince Souvanna Phouma (1901–1984)		1956–1957
(2)	Phoui Sananikone (1903–1983)		1957–1958
5	Khamphan Panya (1917–1994)		1958–1959
(2)	Phoui Sananikone (1903–1983)		1959
(5)	Khamphan Panya (1917–1994)		1960
(4)	Prince Souvanna Phouma (1901–1984)		1960
(1)	Prince Boun Oum (1912–1980)		1960–1962
6	Quinim Pholsena (1915–1963)		1962–1963
(4)	Prince Souvanna Phouma (1901–1984)		1963–1964
7	Pheng Phongsavan (1910–1979)		1964–1965
(4)	Prince Souvanna Phouma (1901–1984)		1965–1974
8	Phoumi Vongvichit (1909–1994)		1974–1975
Lao People's Democratic Republic (1975–present)
9	Phoun Sipaseuth (1920–1994)		1975–1993
10	Somsavat Lengsavad (b. 1945)		1993–2006
11	Thongloun Sisoulith (b. 1945)		2006–2016
12	Saleumxay Kommasith (b. 1968)		2016–2024
13	Thongsavanh Phomvihane (b. 1964)		2024-present

== See also ==
- Politics of Laos
- Foreign relations of Laos
- List of diplomatic missions of Laos
