= Khamtai Siphandone =

President of Laos (1924–2025; served 1998–2006)

- ຄຳໄຕ ສີພັນດອນ
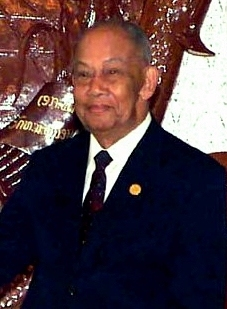
- Siphandone in 2004

Chairman of the Lao People's Revolutionary Party
- In office 24 November 1992 – 21 March 2006
- Preceded by: Kaysone Phomvihane
- Succeeded by: Choummaly Sayasone (as General Secretary)

4th President of Laos
- In office 24 February 1998 – 8 June 2006
- Prime Minister: Sisavath Keobounphanh; Bounnhang Vorachith
- Vice President: Oudom Khattigna; Choummaly Sayasone
- Preceded by: Nouhak Phoumsavanh
- Succeeded by: Choummaly Sayasone

12th Prime Minister of Laos
- In office 15 August 1991 – 24 February 1998
- President: Kaysone Phomvihane; Nouhak Phoumsavanh
- Preceded by: Kaysone Phomvihane
- Succeeded by: Sisavath Keobounphanh

Deputy Prime Minister of Laos
- In office 2 December 1975 – 15 August 1991 Serving with Nouhak Phoumsavan, Phoumi Vongvichit and Phoun Sipraseuth

Minister of Defense
- In office 2 December 1975 – 15 August 1991
- Prime Minister: Kaysone Phomvihane
- Preceded by: Post established
- Succeeded by: Choummaly Sayasone

Personal details
- Born: 8 February 1924 Champasak, Laos, French Indochina
- Died: 2 April 2025 (aged 101) Vientiane, Laos
- Resting place: Laotian National Revolutionary Cemetery
- Party: Lao People's Revolutionary Party (1955–2006)
- Spouse: Thongvanh Siphandone
- Children: 6, including Sonexay and Viengthong
- Relatives: Khampheng Saysompheng (son-in-law)

Military service
- Allegiance: Lao Issara (1946–1948); Pathet Lao (1950–1975); Laos (1975–1991)
- Branch/service: Lao People's Armed Forces
- Years of service: 1946–1991
- Rank: General
- Commands: Lao People's Armed Forces
- Battles/wars: First Indochinese War; Laotian Civil War; Insurgency in Laos; Thai-Laotian Border War

General Khamtai Siphandone (Lao: ຄຳໄຕ ສີພັນດອນ; 8 February 1924 – 2 April 2025) was a Laotian politician who served as the chairman of the Lao People's Revolutionary Party from 1992 to 2006 and as the fourth president of Laos from 1998 to 2006, when he was replaced by Choummaly Sayasone. He joined the Indochinese Communist Party in 1954 and became a member of the Central Committee of the Lao People's Revolutionary Party in 1956.

== Early life ==
Siphandone was born on 8 February 1924 in the village of Huakhongphayai in Khong district to Ny Nilaxay and Saybua Nilaxay, and was among six siblings. He came from a peasant family from the far south of Laos in present-day Champasak province. In 1931, at the age of seven, he was among several children selected by an officer of the department of religious affairs in Vientiane to study in the city, thus beginning his primary education. He later attended the College PAVIE for his secondary education, but left in 1941 after the official's death left Siphandone unable to financially sustain his studies.

His first job was as a postman. After taking a specialized course in Saigon, he became a telegrapher in Phongsaly province in 1944. He joined the national liberation movement Lao Issara, which stood for the independence of Laos and against the return of the French protectorate administration, after the end of the Second World War.

Before the French regained control of Savannakhet in March 1946, Siphandone seized the entire provincial fund (150,000 piastres). He became an officer of the armed wing of the movement and in 1948 their representative for southern Laos. After the split of Lao Issara in 1950 he joined the Viet Minh-backed Pathet Lao.

In 1954, Siphandone became a member of the Communist Party of Indochina, and in 1955 the Lao People's Party, on whose central committee he served from 1957. He was considered a close confidant of the first Secretary-General Kaysone Phomvihane. In 1962 he became his successor as chief of staff of the armed units of the Pathet Lao. In 1966 he became commander-in-chief of the resulting "Lao People's Liberation Army", which fought, with North Vietnamese support, in the Laotian Civil War against the royal troops. In 1972 he rose to membership in the Politburo of the LPRP.

== Political career ==
Siphandone was the military commander of the Pathet Lao rebellion. After the successful Communist takeover in 1975, he became the Minister of Defense and a Deputy Prime Minister of Laos. During the 5th Party Congress in 1991, Siphandone was the third highest-ranking member of the party leadership, after Kaysone Phomvihane and Nouhak Phoumsavanh. On 15 August 1991, he succeeded Kaysone, who had left office to become president, as Prime Minister of Laos. After the death of longtime party leader Kaysone in 1992, Siphandone became Chairman of the Lao People's Revolutionary Party.

Siphandone succeeded Nouhak Phoumsavanh as president in 1998. At the 8th Party Congress in 2006, he became an advisor to the LPRP Central Committee.

Siphandone remained as party leader until 21 March 2006, when he was replaced by Choummaly. He stepped down as president in June, following the 2006 Laotian parliamentary election.

== Family and personal life ==
Siphandone was married to Thongvanh Siphandone. His son Sonexay joined the LPRP Politburo in 2016 and became Prime Minister of Laos in 2022. His daughter Viengthong currently serves as Vice President of Lao PDR since March 2026.

On 8 February 2024, he turned 100, and was sent congratulatory messages by General Secretary of the Communist Party of Vietnam Nguyễn Phú Trọng and President of Vietnam Võ Văn Thưởng. The Vietnamese ambassador to Laos Nguyen Ba Hung presented a birthday gift to Siphandone to his son Sonexay.

== Death and funeral ==
Siphandone died in his residence in Vientiane, on 2 April 2025, at the age of 101. The Laotian government declared a period of mourning lasting from 3 to 7 April. On 3 April, Vietnamese general secretary Lâm led a high-ranking Vietnamese delegation to Vientiane to pay respects to Siphandone. Vietnam announced a period of mourning for two days starting on 4 April. Cuba also announced a period of mourning for one day from 5 April.

Siphandone was granted a state funeral at the That Luang esplanade in Vientiane on 7 April 2025.

== Awards and honours ==
- Laos:
  - National Gold Medal
  - Order of Phoxay Lane Xang
- Brunei:
  - Family Order of Laila Utama (2004)
- Cuba:
  - Order of José Martí
- Vietnam:
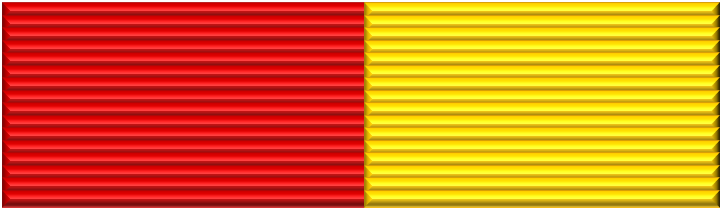
  - Gold Star Order (1993)
- Soviet Union:
  - Order of the Red Banner (1984)

Party political offices
Preceded by Phoumi Vongvichit	President of the Lao Front for National Construction; 1991–2001	Succeeded by Sisavath Keobounphanh
Preceded by Kaysone Phomvihane	Chairman of the Lao People's Revolutionary Party; 1992–2006	Succeeded by Choummaly Sayasone (General Secretary)
Political offices
Preceded by None	Minister of Defense; 1975–1991	Succeeded by Choummaly Sayasone
Preceded by Kaysone Phomvihane	Prime Minister of Laos; 1991–1998	Succeeded by Sisavath Keobounphanh
Preceded by Nouhak Phoumsavanh	President of Laos; 1998–2006	Succeeded by Choummaly Sayasone
Diplomatic posts
Preceded by Megawati Sukarnoputri	Chairperson of ASEAN; 2004	Succeeded by Abdullah Ahmad Badawi
