= 5th National Congress of the Lao People's Revolutionary Party =

- Date: 27–29 March 1991 (3 days)
- Participants: 367 delegates
- Outcome: The election of the 5th Central Committee

The 5th National Congress of the Lao People's Revolutionary Party (LPRP) was held in Vientiane on 27–29 March 1991. The congress occurs once every five years. A total of 367 delegates represented the party's nearly 60,000 members.
