= 11th National Congress of the Lao People's Revolutionary Party =

- Date: 13–15 January 2021 (3 days)
- Participants: 768 delegates
- Outcome: The election of the 11th Central Committee

The 11th National Congress of the Lao People's Revolutionary Party (LPRP) was held in Vientiane from 13 to 15 January 2021. The congress occurs once every five years. A total of 768 delegates represented the party's nearly 350,000 card-carrying members. The intention of the meeting was, according to LPRP General Secretary Bounnhang Vorachit, to "review together the implementation of the resolution of the 10th National Party Congress and generally evaluate the creating of foundations for marching toward socialism over the past years; learn useful lessons and make agreement on directions, policy and guidance on the national socio-economic development plan for years to come to ensure the continued nurturing of people’ democratic regime and creating of foundations for marching toward socialism".

== Meeting plan ==
- Political Report of the LPRP Central Committee
- Ninth Five-year Socio-economic Development Plan for 2021–2025
- Amendment to the party's constitution
- Election of the 11th LPRP Central Committee
