= Thongloun Sisoulith =

General Secretary of the Lao People's Revolutionary Party since 2021

- ທອງລຸນ ສີສຸລິດ
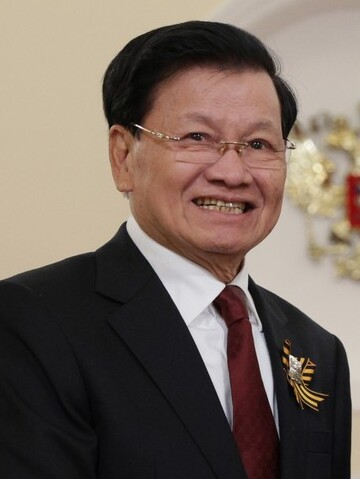
- Thongloun in 2026

General Secretary of the Lao People's Revolutionary Party
- Incumbent
- Assumed office 15 January 2021
- Deputy: Bounthong Chitmany; Vansay Phornsavanh (Standing Member)
- Preceded by: Bounnhang Vorachit

7th President of Laos
- Incumbent
- Assumed office 22 March 2021
- Prime Minister: Phankham Viphavanh; Sonexay Siphandone; Saleumxay Kommasith
- Vice President: Viengthong Siphandone; First Vice President; Pany Yathotu; Second Vice President; Bounthong Chitmany
- Preceded by: Bounnhang Vorachit

17th Prime Minister of Laos
- In office 20 April 2016 – 22 March 2021
- President: Bounnhang Vorachit
- Preceded by: Thongsing Thammavong
- Succeeded by: Phankham Viphavanh
Additional positions
Minister of Foreign Affairs
In office 8 June 2006 – 20 April 2016
Prime Minister	Bouasone Bouphavanh; Thongsing Thammavong
Preceded by	Somsavat Lengsavad
Succeeded by	Saleumxay Kommasith
Deputy Prime Minister of Laos
In office 27 March 2001 – 20 April 2016
Prime Minister	Bounnhang Vorachit; Bouasone Bouphavanh; Thongsing Thammavong
President of the State Committee for Planning and Investment
In office 27 March 2001 – 8 June 2006
Prime Minister	Bounnhang Vorachit
Preceded by	Bouathong Vonglokham
Succeeded by	Soulivong Daravong

Personal details
- Born: 10 November 1945 (age 80) Houaphanh Province, Laos
- Party: Lao People's Revolutionary Party
- Spouse: Naly Sisoulith
- Children: 3
- Education: Pedagogical College of Neo Lao Hak Sat; Herzen University; Russian Academy of Sciences (PhD)

Thongloun Sisoulith (Lao: ທອງລຸນ ສີສຸລິດ; born 10 November 1945) is a Laotian politician and historian who serves as the general secretary of the Lao People's Revolutionary Party and the seventh president of Laos since 2021.

Thongloun was born and educated in Houaphanh province, before receiving education in Leningrad and Moscow in the Soviet Union. During the Laotian Civil War, he supported the Pathet Lao as a teacher. He then became the Deputy Minister of Foreign Affairs in 1987 which lasted to 1992, where he then served in other posts in government. In 2001, he became the deputy prime minister before becoming the minister of Foreign Affairs in 2006. Described as a 'moderate' by the U.S embassy in Vientiane, Thongloun helped improve Laos–United States relations, which was welcomed in 2009 by Senator Jim Webb and in 2010 by Hillary Clinton; while improving Laos' relationship with China and Vietnam. In 2016, he became the prime minister where he undertook anti-corruption campaigns. He then became general secretary of the LPRP, and president in 2021.

== Early life and education ==
Thongloun Sisoulith was born into a Tai Deng family in the Houaphan province of Laos on 10 November 1945. He went on to study at Pedagogical College of Neo Lao Hak Sat in Houaphan from 1962 to 1969. He was further educated in the Soviet Union and Vietnam. After finishing graduating, he received a doctor of philosophy in history and a master of arts. From 1973 to 1978, Thongloun studied a Master of Linguistics and Literature at the Herzen Pedagogical Institute in Leningrad, Soviet Union. Then from 1981 to 1984, he studied a PhD in History of International Relations at the Academy of Social Sciences in Moscow.

== Teaching career ==
During the Laotian Civil War, Thongloun served with the Communist Pathet Lao as a teacher. From 1967 to 1969, Thoungloun served in Educational Department of the Neo Lao Hak Sat as a senior member, before in 1969 he became a member of the Office of the Representative of the Neo Lao Hak Sat in Hanoi, North Vietnam. He then returned to and from 1978 to 1979, where he served as a lecturer at the National University of Laos following the Communist takeover of Vientiane in 1975. He headed the Russian language programme at the university.

== Political career ==
Throughout his years in government, he has a list of appointments. He was Deputy Minister of Foreign Affairs from 1987 to 1992, Minister of Labour and Social Welfare from 1993 to 1997, and a member of the National Assembly from 1998 to 2000. He became deputy prime minister and President of the State Planning Committee on 27 March 2001, and he was additionally appointed Foreign Minister on 8 June 2006, replacing Somsavat Lengsavad. He was chosen to become Prime Minister of Laos at the 10th Party Congress on 23 January 2016.

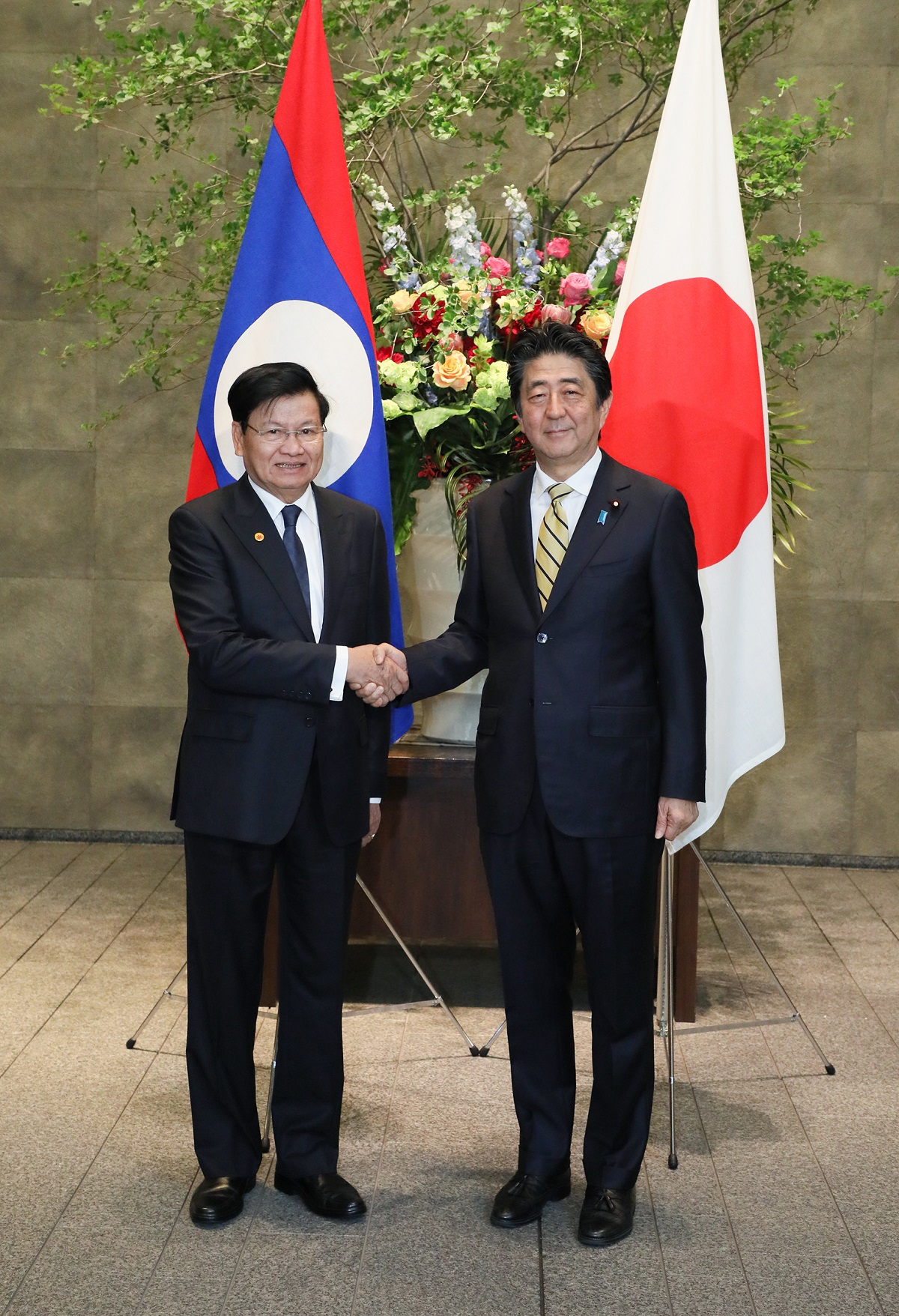
Thongloun meeting with Shinzo Abe on 30 May 2019 when they were Prime Ministers

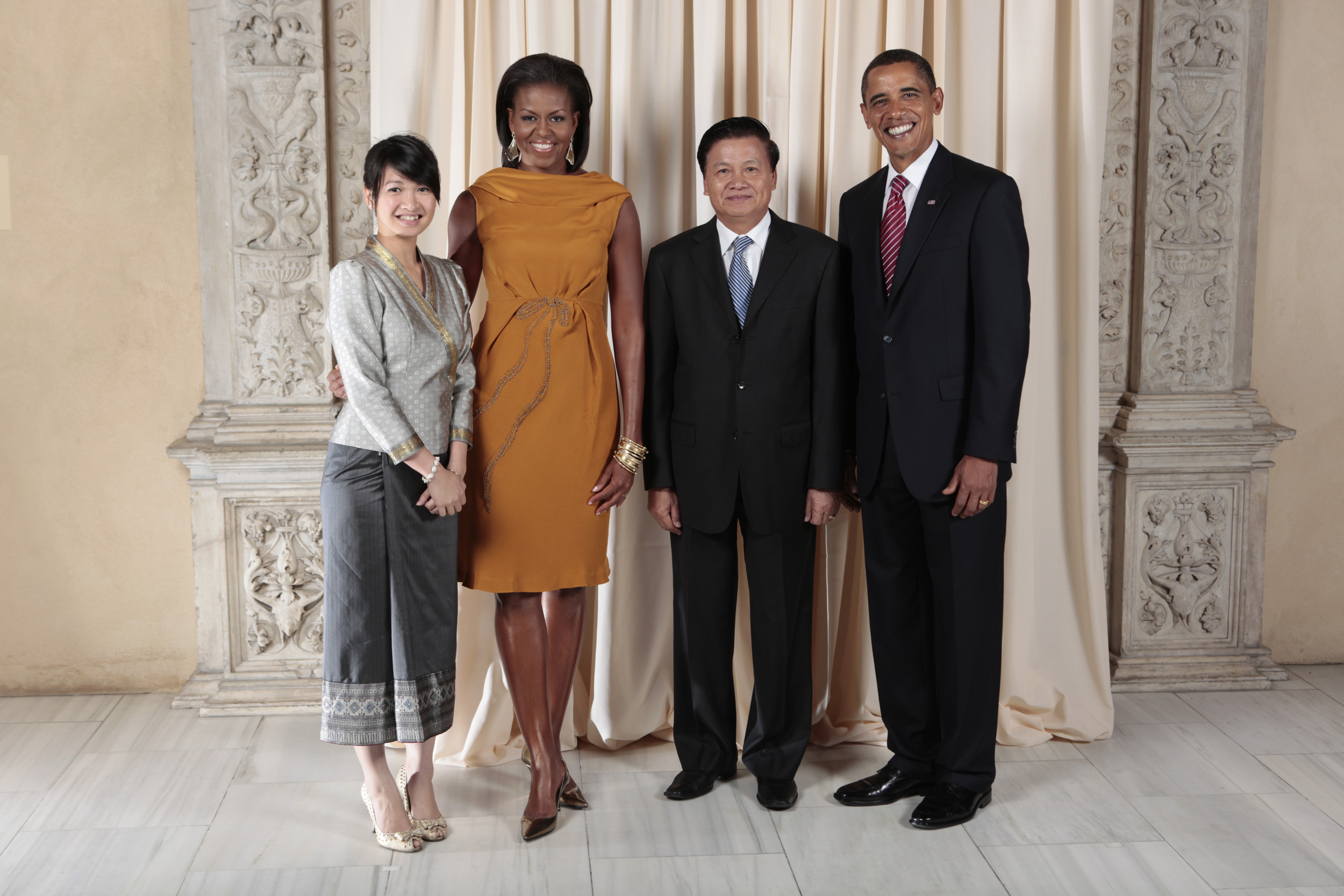
Thongloun and his daughter with President of the United States Barack Obama and First Lady Michelle Obama, 2009

=== As Prime Minister (2016–2021) ===
After Thongloun became the Prime Minister of Laos, he began anti-corruption campaigns in the Lao government. From April 2016 to February 2017, the State Inspection Authority made 25 arrests related to corruption. Under Thongloun, the government auctioned off BMW 7 Series and Mercedes-Benz cars issued by the government and replaced them with Toyota Camrys. In 2017, there were disputes on the Cambodia–Laos border, and Cambodian Prime Minister Hun Sen warned: "I appeal to Laos Prime Minister Thongloun Sisoulith to withdraw troops from Cambodian territory without any conditions."

On 23 July 2018, a saddle dam part of the Xe Pian-Xe Namnoy hydropower project on the Mekong river in Champasak province collapsed, killing 71 people whilst displacing 14,440. The dam was being worked on by Laos, Thailand and South Korea, with there being warnings of the dam's unsafety in preceding days. As Prime Minister, Thongloun postponed meetings and travelled to the affected area in Sanamxay district to oversee relief efforts.

On 4 January 2020, Thongloun represented Laos in Hanoi at the 42nd meeting of the Vietnam – Laos Inter-Governmental Committee with the Vietnamese Prime Minister. During the meetings, he praised Vietnam's economy, with both countries agreeing to strengthen ties and cooperation between each other. During the COVID-19 pandemic, Laos cooperated with Vietnam and Cambodia, with Thongloun holding phone calls with his Cambodian and Vietnamese counterparts Hun Sen and Nguyễn Xuân Phúc. At the 36th ASEAN summit on 26 June 2020, he represented Laos where he spoke on the success of ASEAN during the COVID-19 pandemic. On 10 June, he praised the National Taskforce Committee for its handling of the COVID-19 pandemic in Laos following 59 days of no new cases of COVID-19, and support from other countries such as China, United States and Vietnam.

In August 2020, he urged the media to continue "defeating the fake, deceptive, and harmful news" on social media sites. This was interpreted by international media as a way to tell the media in Laos to not report negatively on the government. On 13 December 2020, Thongloun spoke to the United Nations on how Laos continues to follow the Paris Agreement, and other policies which aim to reduce carbon emissions. He asked for support from other nations to assist Laos reach these targets.

At the 11th National Congress of the Lao People's Revolutionary Party on 15 January 2021, he was elected the party's general secretary, and hence the de facto leader of Laos, becoming the first civilian with no military background to be general secretary. Thongloun was sworn into office on 22 March 2021, replacing previous leader Bounnhang Vorachith after the latter's retirement. Phankham Viphavanh replaced Thongloun as Prime-minister.

== Leadership ==
Following his swearing in as general secretary and president, Thongloun vowed to create economic growth and reduce poverty in Laos by working with the Lao People's Revolutionary Party (LPRP). In March 2021, Laos began using the Russian Sputnik V COVID-19 vaccine as the main vaccine during its vaccination programmes.

On 3 December 2021, he and General Secretary of the Chinese Communist Party Xi Jinping opened the Boten–Vientiane section of the Lao-China railway. Laos faces rising debt to China, with half of Laos' external debt being owed to China. At the 27th Future of Asia conference in Tokyo on 27 May 2022, Thongloun downplayed concerns over a Chinese debt-trap.

Thongloun was re-elected as general secretary on 8 January 2026 at the 1st plenary session of the 12th Central Committee.

=== Foreign policy ===
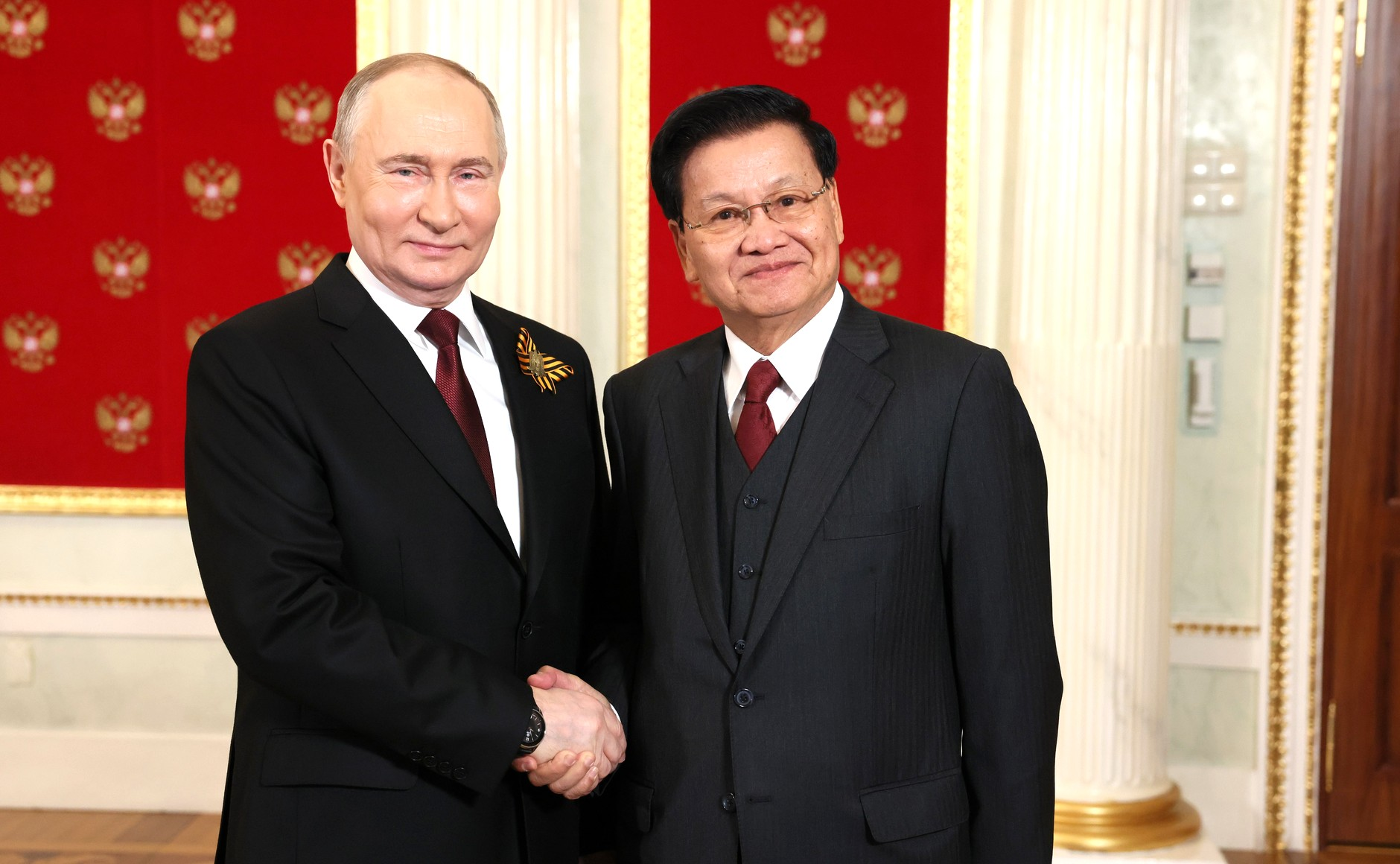
Thongloun with Russian president Vladimir Putin before the Moscow Victory Day Parade in Moscow, Russia, 9 May 2024

Under Thongloun, Laos finds itself balancing its relationships between China and Vietnam. On 26 May 2023, following the Russian invasion of Ukraine and tensions between China and Taiwan, Thongloun warned that these conflicts may escalate into larger scale wars.

In October 2024, Thongloun attended the 16th BRICS summit in Kazan, Russia, where he met with General Secretary of the Chinese Communist Party Xi Jinping and other leaders.

== Personal life ==
He is married to Naly Sisoulith (born 1947). The couple has three children: two sons and one daughter. Thongloun's daughter Moukdavanh is a deputy director general of the International Organization Department within the Ministry of Foreign Affairs of Laos, Thongloun's son Thongly is Secretary of Lao People's Revolutionary Youth Union.

In addition to Lao, he speaks Vietnamese, Russian and English.

== Awards and honors ==
- Thailand: Knight Grand Cross (First Class) of the Order of the White Elephant (18 March 2010)
- Russia:
  - Gold Medal of the Russian Peace Foundation "For Peacekeeping and Charitable Activities" (5 October 2015)
  - Order of Friendship (20 October 2015)
- Vietnam: Member of the Gold Star Order (18 July 2017)

=== Honorary doctorates ===
- Thailand: Rajamangala University of Technology Isan (6 July 2016)
- Thailand: Khon Kaen University (11 April 2017)
- China: Guangxi University for Nationalities (1 December 2022)

Party political offices
Preceded by Bounnhang Vorachith	General Secretary of the People's Revolutionary Party; 2021–	Incumbent
Preceded by Bounnhang Vorachith	President of Laos; 2021–	Incumbent
Political offices
Preceded by Thongsing Thammavong	Prime Minister of Laos; 2016–2021	Succeeded by Phankham Viphavan
