= Kaysone Phomvihane =

Lao politician and communist leader

- ໄກສອນ ພົມວິຫານ
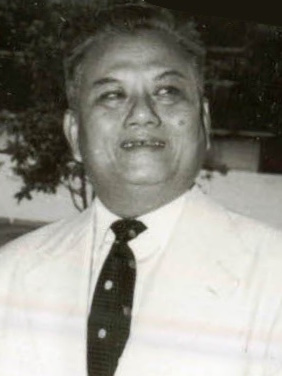
- Kaysone in 1978

General Secretary of the Lao People's Revolutionary Party^{[a]}
- In office 22 March 1955 – 21 November 1992
- Succeeded by: Khamtai Siphandon

2nd President of Laos
- In office 15 August 1991 – 21 November 1992
- Prime Minister: Khamtai Siphandon
- Preceded by: Phoumi Vongvichit (Acting)
- Succeeded by: Nouhak Phoumsavanh

11th Prime Minister of Laos
- In office 8 December 1975 – 15 August 1991
- President: Souphanouvong; Phoumi Vongvichit (Acting)
- Preceded by: Souvanna Phouma
- Succeeded by: Khamtai Siphandon

Personal details
- Born: Nguyễn Cai Song; 13 December 1920 Savannakhet, French Indochina
- Died: 21 November 1992 (aged 71) Vientiane, Laos
- Resting place: Laotian National Revolutionary Cemetery
- Party: Lao People's Revolutionary Party
- Spouse: Thongvin Phomvihane
- Children: 4, including Xaysomphone, Thongsavanh and Santiphab
- Relatives: Xaypanya (grandson)
- a. General Secretary of the Central Committee of the Lao People's Party until February 1972; General Secretary of the Central Committee of the Lao People's Revolutionary Party until March 1991; Chairman of the Central Committee of the Lao People's Revolutionary Party since March 1991

Kaysone Phomvihane (Lao: ໄກສອນ ພົມວິຫານ, pronounced [kàj.sɔ̌ːn pʰóm.wī(ʔ).hǎːn]; 13 December 1920 – 21 November 1992) was a Laotian politician and revolutionary who served as the first leader of the Communist Lao People's Revolutionary Party from 1955 until his death in 1992. After the Communists seized power in the wake of the Laotian Civil War, he was the de facto leader of Laos from 1975 until his death. He served as the first Prime Minister of the Lao People's Democratic Republic from 1975 to 1991 and then as the second President from 1991 to 1992. His theories and policies are officially known as Kaysone Phomvihane Thought.

== Early life and education ==
Kaysone was born on 13 December 1920 in Naxeng village, Khanthabouly district, Savannakhet Province, in what was then French Indochina. His father, a Vietnamese named Nguyễn Trí Loan, was a civil servant in the French colonial administration, and his mother, Nang Dok, was a Lao farmer. He was given the Vietnamese name Nguyễn Cai Song at birth. He was the eldest child and had two younger sisters.

At the age of seven, Kaysone began attending a Lao-language primary school, and he later completed his primary education at a French-language school in his home town. In 1934, he entered the Protectorate College in Hanoi, now the Chu Van An School. In 1942, he began studying medicine, before switching to law at the University of Indochina. He did not complete his law degree.

Kaysone later said that he had become a revolutionary at the age of 16 out of patriotism, and he took part in the revolutionary movement in Hanoi from 1936 to 1939. While studying in Hanoi, he became involved in student activities linked to the Indochinese Communist Party (ICP), and during the Second World War, he protested against the Japanese occupation. He reportedly had close personal ties with Ho Chi Minh and Võ Nguyên Giáp, and he received his first military and political training from the Viet Minh. In 1944, he joined the Vietnamese Youth Association for National Liberation.

== Revolutionary career ==
=== Resistance against French rule ===
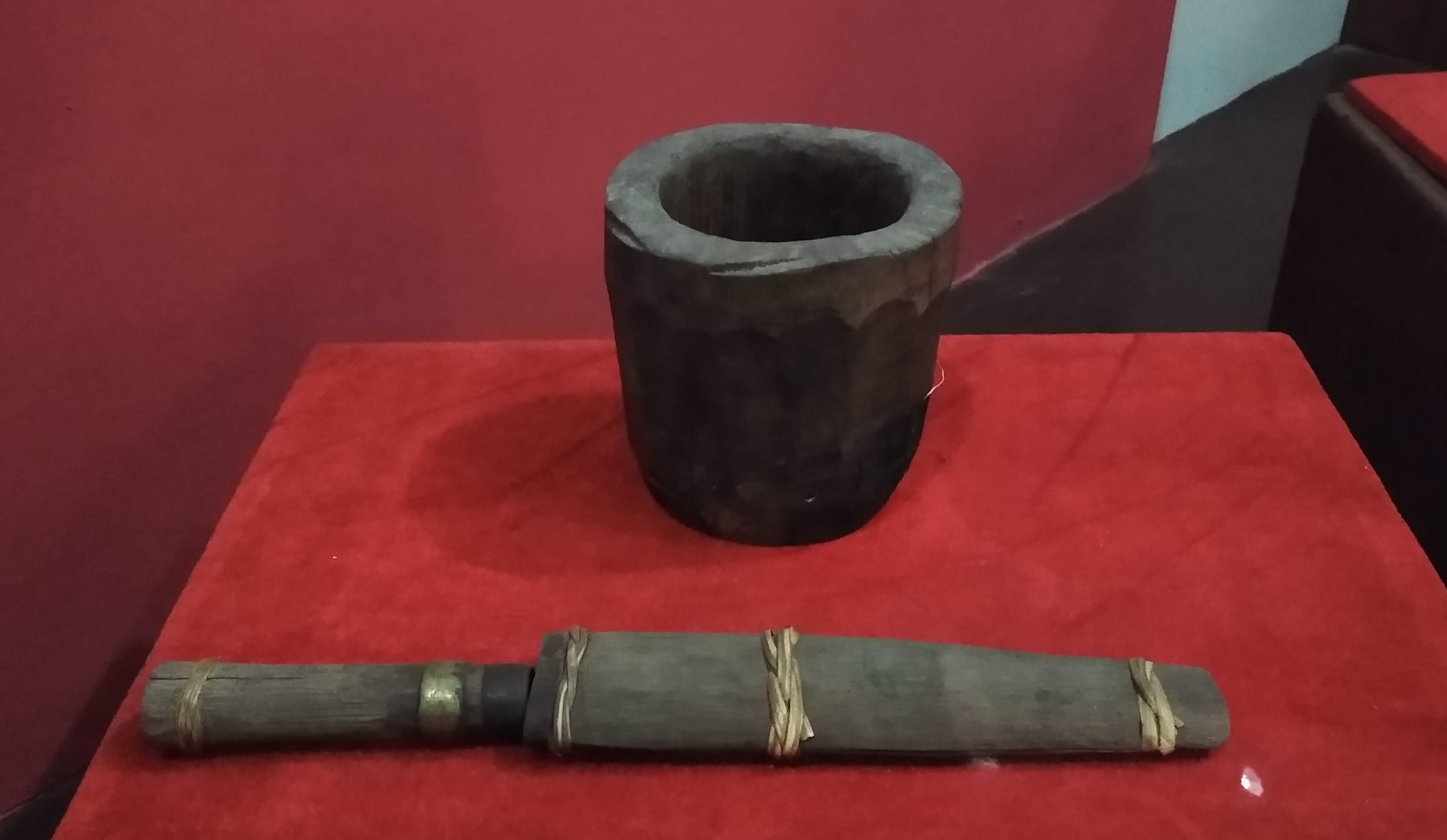
Materials used by Kaysone in an oath-taking ceremony in 1948

In the early 1940s, Kaysone was active with Nouhak Phoumsavanh at the grassroots level of the Lao Issara movement. On 23 August 1945, he took part in the movement to seize power from the Japanese in Savannakhet province. According to Britannica, Ho Chi Minh sent him back to Laos to join the anti-French movement that later became known as the Pathet Lao. From March to December 1946, he worked on a committee for liaison between Laos and Vietnam. In 1948, he was appointed to lead the "Upper Laos assault unit", which the Vietnamese People's Army had set up for propaganda work in north-eastern Laos near the Vietnamese border.

On 20 January 1949, Kaysone founded the Lao Issara army, the forerunner of the Lao People's Army, in Xiengkhor district of Houaphanh Province, and he served as its commander. He was admitted to the ICP on 28 July 1949. In 1950, he became a member of the central committee of the Lao Free Front (Neo Lao Issara), and in August that year, he became Minister of Defence in the resistance government formed under Souphanouvong.

=== Lao People's Party ===
On 22 March 1955, the Lao People's Party was founded at Nameo village in Viengxay district, Houaphanh Province, and Kaysone was elected its general secretary. He was also made secretary of the party's Central Military Committee, and he commanded the Pathet Lao forces until 1960, when Khamtai Siphandone took over the post. The party directed the Lao Patriotic Front from behind the scenes until 1975, and although Souphanouvong was the movement's public leader, real power lay with Kaysone.

In 1958, Kaysone stood unsuccessfully for election to the National Assembly. In 1959, the party decided that its leaders, especially Kaysone, should withdraw to a base in North Vietnam, and he travelled from Vientiane through Savannakhet to the outskirts of Hanoi. After fighting resumed in 1964, he moved the Pathet Lao leadership into caves in the mountains of northern Laos at Viengxay, where they withstood American bombing. For about thirty years, he led the revolution from behind the scenes, from Vietnam and from the caves of Houaphanh.

At its Second Congress in 1972, the party was renamed the Lao People's Revolutionary Party. By the time peace talks began that year, the Pathet Lao controlled about two-thirds of the country's territory and half of its population. In 1972, Kaysone also put forward the idea that Laos could move to socialism while bypassing the capitalist stage of development.

== Prime Minister ==
=== Establishment of the Lao PDR ===
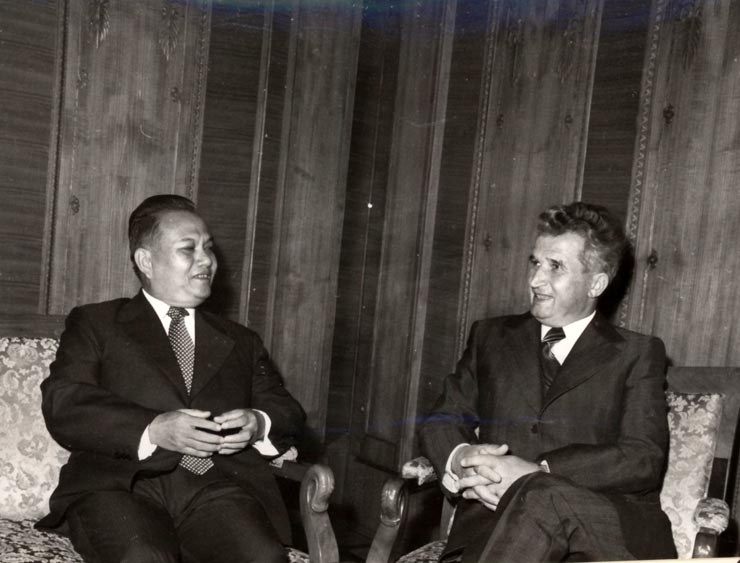
Kaysone with Nicolae Ceaușescu in 1976

After the fall of Saigon in April 1975, the party called for an uprising and took power in Laos with little bloodshed. A National Congress of People's Representatives met in Vientiane on 1 and 2 December 1975, the first occasion on which most of the world saw Kaysone. He read the report on abolishing the monarchy and establishing a people's democratic republic, and on 2 December, he presided over the session that proclaimed the Lao People's Democratic Republic and nominated Souphanouvong as president. Kaysone became the first prime minister of the new state. As general secretary of the ruling party and head of government, he was the country's preeminent leader. As head of government, he held the title of Chairman of the Council of Ministers.

The deposed King Sisavang Vatthana and Queen Khamphoui were later held in a detention camp, where they reportedly died around 1981, and Britannica counts Kaysone among the leaders responsible.

=== Foreign relations ===
Kaysone kept Laos closely allied with Vietnam and largely isolated from Western influence until the end of the Cold War. Laos and Vietnam signed a border convention on 18 July 1977, and demarcation on the ground was largely completed between 1978 and 1987. He also maintained close ties with the Soviet Union, and he led a party and government delegation there in October 1987. China had long given Laos aid, mainly for road building in the north, and Mao Zedong received Kaysone in Beijing in 1967 and 1970. When China and Vietnam split in 1978, Kaysone sided with Vietnam and cut Chinese supply lines through Laos to the communist insurgency in Thailand, and during the Sino-Vietnamese War of 1979, Laos reduced its relations with China to the level of chargé d'affaires. In 1979, he and the Thai prime minister Kriangsak Chamanan issued a joint communiqué that became the basis of relations with Thailand.

As the Cold War ended, Kaysone sought new partners, and in 1989, he visited France and Japan in search of financial aid. In October 1989, he made a state visit to Beijing, where he met Deng Xiaoping, and relations between the two countries and their ruling parties were normalised that year. He carried a message from the Vietnamese leader Nguyễn Văn Linh to Deng and took Deng's reply back to Vietnam, and Chinese accounts credit him with helping to restore relations between China and Vietnam in 1991. Laos and China signed a boundary treaty in October 1991, and Kaysone visited China again as president in April 1992.

=== Economic policy ===
After 1975, the government recognised private enterprise in principle but did not encourage it. In late 1979, the party's Central Committee adopted the Seventh Resolution, which marked the beginning of a shift towards a market-oriented economy. The reforms remained limited, and the Third Party Congress in April 1982 emphasised development along socialist lines and put off economic liberalisation. Kaysone remained general secretary through the party's Second, Third and Fourth Congresses.

At the Fourth Party Congress in November 1986, Kaysone launched the policy of chintanakan mai, which wrote reform and opening into the party's programme and began economic liberalisation within a socialist framework. The congress introduced the New Economic Mechanism, which gradually exposed the economy to world market forces. Its main elements were the privatisation and restructuring of the state sector, the encouragement of foreign investment and a transition to a market economy under state control. The government also undertook to give priority to agriculture and forestry, to replace centralised economic management with business accounting, to allow several forms of ownership and to expand foreign economic relations. The reforms began in the same year as Vietnam's Đổi Mới. Economic controls were relaxed and some private enterprise was allowed, but political dissent was not tolerated.

=== Political approach ===
After the failure of rapid socialist transformation, Kaysone took a pragmatic line on the economy, but he held to Marxism–Leninism and did not compromise on the party's monopoly of power. In 1990, as communist rule collapsed in Eastern Europe, the deputy ministers Thongsouk Saysangkhi and Latsami Khamphoui wrote to Kaysone criticising the political system, and they called for a multiparty system and free elections. They and Feng Sakchittaphong, an official of the Ministry of Justice, were arrested in Vientiane on 8 October 1990. Amnesty International considered them to be held solely for the peaceful exercise of their freedom of expression. Within the leadership, Kaysone built his own network while taking account of groups that were reluctant to reform, and he carefully maintained a balance of power.

== President ==
At the Fifth Party Congress in March 1991, the posts of general secretary and the secretariat were abolished, and Kaysone became chairman of the party, a new post that directed the Central Committee's day-to-day work. Khamtai Siphandone became prime minister in 1991. In August 1991, the Supreme People's Assembly adopted the country's first constitution, which strengthened the previously ceremonial presidency, and it elected Kaysone president. He thus held the top posts in both the party and the state. That year, the red star and the hammer and sickle were removed from the national emblem.

According to Britannica, Kaysone relaxed some government controls during his presidency and scheduled elections to the Supreme People's Assembly. Britannica also states that he released most political prisoners, including officers of the former pro-Western government who had been held since 1975, and that he improved relations with China, reducing Laos's dependence on Vietnam.

== Death and funeral ==
Kaysone died in Vientiane on 21 November 1992, at the age of 71, after a long illness. He was given a state funeral with Buddhist rites. Nouhak Phoumsavanh, the second-ranking member of the Politburo, succeeded him as president, and Khamtai became party chairman while remaining prime minister. On 10 December 1992, the United Nations General Assembly observed a minute of silence in his memory. On 24 March 2012, his cremated remains were moved, together with those of thirteen other revolutionary leaders, to a newly built National Cemetery.

== Legacy ==
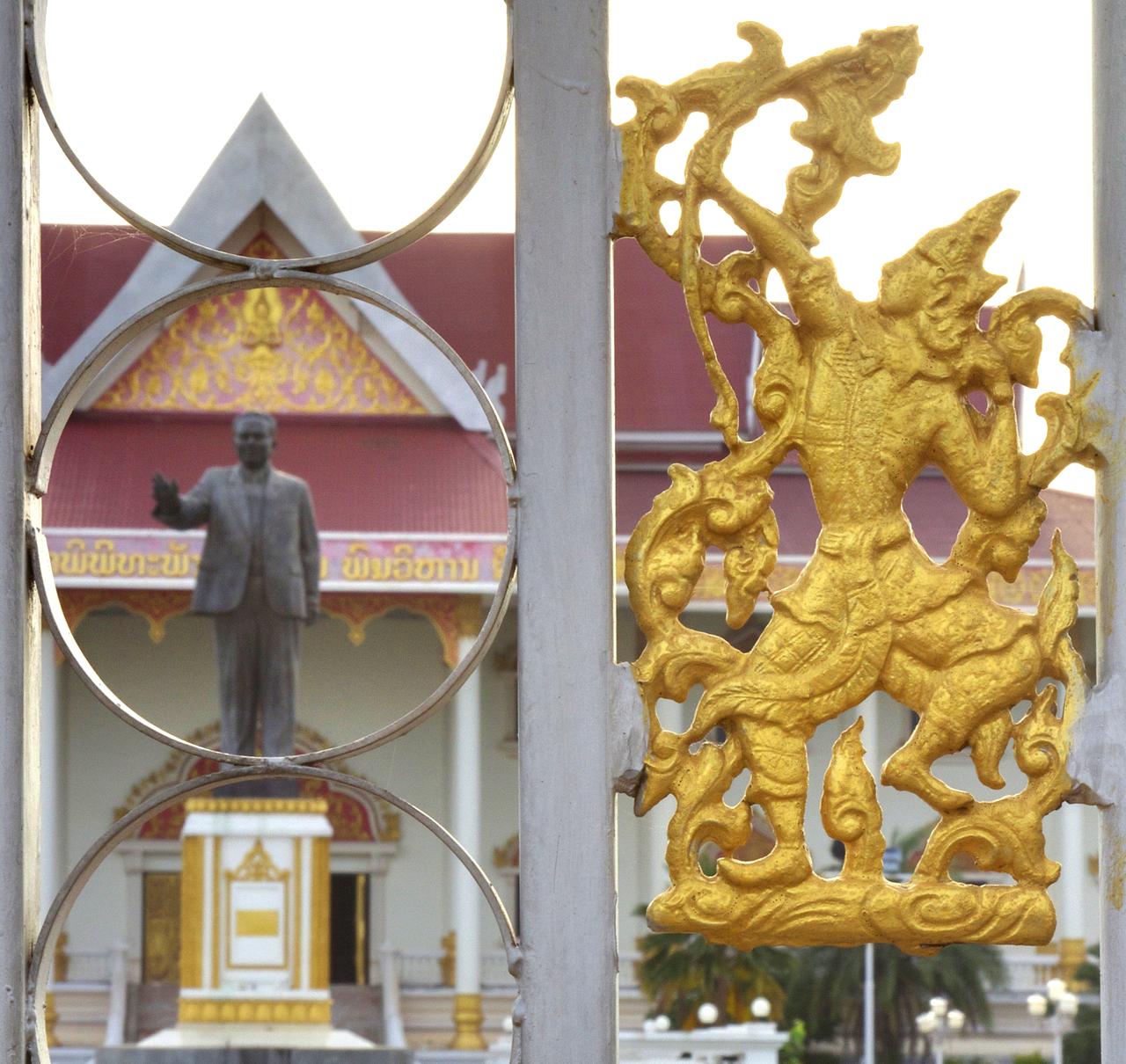
The Kaysone Phomvihane Museum in Vientiane

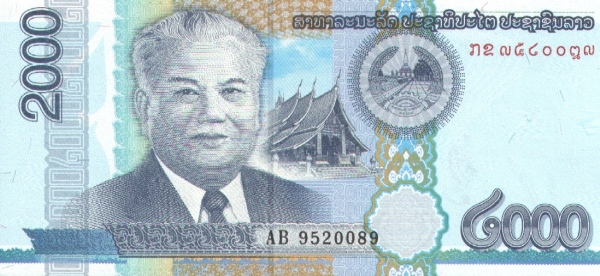
Kaysone on the obverse of a 2000 kip banknote

Kaysone is revered in Laos as a "Father of the Nation" and usually referred to as "Phra Kaysone Phomvihane". After his death, the government placed statues of him in every provincial capital. A museum in his honour was built in Vientiane with financial help from Vietnam, and its interior layout resembles that of the Ho Chi Minh Museum in Hanoi. On 13 December 2000, the 80th anniversary of his birth, a large bronze statue of him was unveiled in front of the museum. In 2015, the Ho Chi Minh Museum stepped up its cooperation with the Kaysone Phomvihane Museum. According to the writer Kham Vorapheth, the official veneration of Kaysone has become more modest than before and holds less interest for younger people.

At the party's Tenth Congress in January 2016, the outgoing general secretary, Choummaly Sayasone, credited Kaysone with founding the army and the party and with launching the renovation policy. The congress placed Kaysone Phomvihane Thought alongside Marxism–Leninism as the ideological foundation of the party. In 2017, an academic seminar was held on Ho Chi Minh Thought and Kaysone Phomvihane Thought.

== Family ==
Kaysone married Thongvin Phomvihane, who became a member of the LPRP Central Committee, but she was not re-elected at the Fifth Party Congress in 1991 amid allegations of abuse of power and illegal timber exports. Their eldest son, Xaysomphone Phomvihane, born in 1956, was president of the Lao Front for National Construction from 2016 and president of the National Assembly from 2021 until his death on 8 August 2026. His brother Thongsavanh replaced Saleumxay Kommasith as Minister of Foreign Affairs in November 2024, a change that the analyst David Hutt linked to the consolidation of the Phomvihane family in senior leadership roles. Another son, Sanyahak, was a deputy defence minister and a member of the party Central Committee when he died in July 2013, at the age of 45. Kaysone's son Santiphab, a former governor of Savannakhet Province, became Minister of Finance in 2023 and later also deputy prime minister.

== Honours ==
Country	Honour	Date	Ref.
Cuba	Order of José Martí	8 September 1976	
Vietnam	Gold Star Order	1 May 1981	
Thailand	Order of Rajamitrabhorn	27 December 1991	

== Works ==
- Revolution in Laos: Practice and Prospects (Progress Publishers, Moscow, 1981)

== See also ==
- Kaysone Phomvihane Museum

Political offices
Preceded by Souvanna Phouma	Prime Minister of Laos; 1975–1991	Succeeded by Khamtai Siphandon
Preceded by Phoumi Vongvichit (as Acting President)	President of Laos; 1991–1992	Succeeded by Nouhak Phoumsavanh
Party political offices
Preceded by None	General Secretary of the Lao People's Revolutionary Party; 1955–1991	Succeeded by Himself (as Chairman)
Preceded by Himself (as General Secretary)	Chairman of the Lao People's Revolutionary Party; 1991–1992	Succeeded by Khamtai Siphandon
