= List of governments of Laos =

The list of governments of the Lao People's Democratic Republic, commonly abbreviated to Lao Government, is the main executive institution of government. It is led by the Prime Minister, the country's head of government. The Prime Minister is nominated by the President at a plenary session of the National Assembly, the country's legislature. The term of a government follows that of the elected legislature.

== Governments ==
Government	Prime Minister	Took office	Left office	Elections	Legislature
1st	Kaysone Phomvihane	8 December 1975	1 June 1989	—	1st Supreme People's Assembly
2nd	Kaysone Phomvihane	1 June 1989	15 August 1991	26 March 1989	2nd Supreme People's Assembly
2nd	Khamtai Siphandon	15 August 1991	25 February 1993	—	2nd Supreme People's Assembly
3rd	Khamtai Siphandon	25 February 1993	24 February 1998	20 December 1992	3rd National Assembly
4th	Sisavath Keobounphanh	24 February 1998	27 March 2001	21 December 1997	4th National Assembly
4th	Bounnhang Vorachith	27 March 2001	30 September 2002	—	4th National Assembly
5th	Bounnhang Vorachith	30 September 2002	8 June 2006	24 February 2002	5th National Assembly
6th	Bouasone Bouphavanh	8 June 2006	23 December 2010	30 April 2006	6th National Assembly
6th	Thongsing Thammavong	23 December 2010	15 June 2011	—	6th National Assembly
7th	Thongsing Thammavong	15 June 2011	20 April 2016	30 April 2011	7th National Assembly
8th	Thongloun Sisoulith	20 April 2016	22 March 2021	20 March 2016	8th National Assembly
9th	Phankham Viphavanh	22 March 2021	22 March 2021	21 February 2021	9th National Assembly

== See also ==
- Prime Minister of Laos
- Government of Laos
