= Lao Front for National Development =

Lao Front for National Development ແນວລາວສ້າງຊາດ neo lao sang xat
- Founded: 1979; 47 years ago
- Preceded by: (Laos) Pathet Lao
- Headquarters: Vientiane, Laos
- Ideology: Communism; Marxism–Leninism; Kaysone Phomvihane Thought
- National Assembly: 164 / 164

Website
- https://lfnd.gov.la/

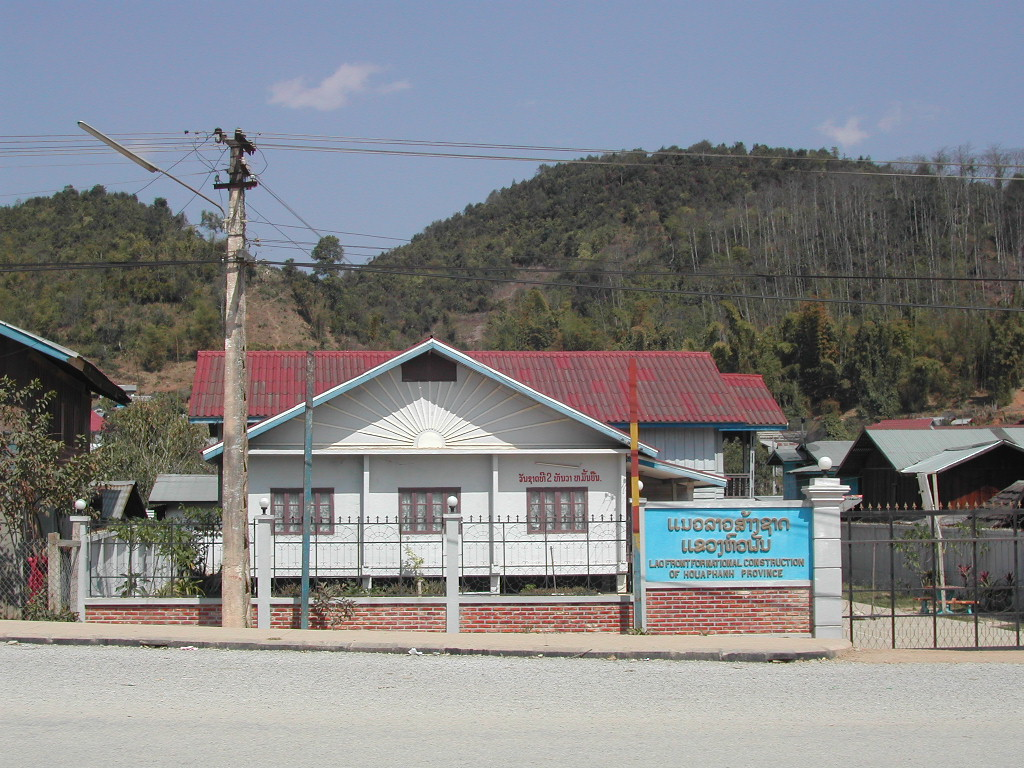
An LFND building in Xam Neua

The Lao Front for National Development (LFND; Lao: ແນວລາວສ້າງຊາດ, Neo Lao Sang Xat) is a Laotian popular front founded in 1979, and led by the Lao People's Revolutionary Party. Its task is to organize Laotian mass mobilization, and other socio-political, organizations. In 1988, its tasks were expanded to include certain ethnic minority affairs. It is also in charge of religious affairs; all religious organizations within Laos must register with the LFND.

== Presidents ==
| Name | Period |
|---|---|
| Souphanouvong | 1979–1986 |
| Phoumi Vongvichit | 1986–1991 |
| Maisouk Xaysompheng | 1991-1996 |
| Oudom Khattiya | 1996–1998 |
| Sisavath Keobounphanh | 2001–2011 |
| Phandoungchit Vongsa | 2011–2016 |
| Xaysomphone Phomvihane | 2016–2021 |
| Sinlavong Khoutphaitoun | 2021–2026 |
| Kikeo Khaykhamphithoune | 2026-Present |

== Formerly Front organisations ==
- Neo Lao Issara (Free Lao Front) (1950–1956), chairman: Souphanouvong
- Neo Lao Hak Sat (Lao Patriotic Front) (1956–1979), chairman: Souphanouvong

== Electoral history ==
=== National Assembly elections ===
| Election | Votes | % | Seats | +/– | Position | Government |
|---|---|---|---|---|---|---|
| 1958 | | ~33% | 9 / 60 | ▲9 | ▲1st | |
| 1960 | | | 0 / 59 | ▼9 | ▼ | |
| 1989 | | 100% | 79 / 79 | ▲79 | ▲1st | Sole legal coalition |
| 1992 | 2,009,727 | 100% | 85 / 85 | ▲6 | 1st | Sole legal coalition |
| 1997 | 2,284,632 | 100% | 99 / 99 | ▲14 | 1st | Sole legal coalition |
| 2002 | 2,543,403 | 100% | 109 / 109 | ▲10 | 1st | Sole legal coalition |
| 2006 | 2,819,904 | 100% | 115 / 115 | ▲6 | 1st | Sole legal coalition |
| 2011 | 3,230,000 | 100% | 132 / 132 | ▲17 | 1st | Sole legal coalition |
| 2016 | 3,657,026 | 100% | 149 / 149 | ▲17 | 1st | Sole legal coalition |
| 2021 | 3,973,017 | 100% | 158 / 158 | ▲14 | 1st | Sole legal coalition |
| 2026 | TBA | TBA | TBA | TBA | TBA | TBA |
