= Politics of Laos =

The politics of the Lao People's Democratic Republic takes place in the framework of a unitary communist state.

== Judicial organs ==
=== Supreme People's Court ===
The Supreme People's Court of the Lao People's Democratic Republic was established in 1982. As outlined in Article 92, the People's Supreme Court of the Lao People's Democratic Republic is the highest judicial body and "examines the judgments and judgments of the people's courts and military courts". There has been indications that women have served on the provincial courts. For instance, in 2018, it was announced that Napaporn Phong Thai was appointed as the President of Court Zone 2, Xayaburi Province.

=== Public Prosecutor's Office ===
The Public Prosecutor's Office was established in 1990. Article 99 of the Constitution of Laos states that the office has the responsibility of "monitor[ing] the observance and implementation of laws throughout the country, protect[ing] the rights of the state and society...[and] the legitimate interests of the people, and prosecut[ing] detainees in accordance with the law". The office is organized in the following ways:

Supreme People's Prosecutor

- The Office of the Supreme People's Prosecutor
- The Office of the Public Prosecutor at the appellate level

The Chief of the Supreme Public Prosecutor directs all the activities of the Public Prosecutor at every level. All activities are reported to the National Assembly.

Local People's Procuratorate

- Provincial and city public prosecutors' offices
- District, Municipal Public Prosecutor's Office (district or municipal public prosecutors are called local public prosecutors)

=== Military Prosecutor's Office ===
As of June 2022, the Supreme People's Prosecutor is Xayasana Kotphuthone.

=== Laos Bar Association ===
As for attorneys in general, according to a 2016 article, there are 188 lawyers in Laos who are members of the Laos Bar Association. Most of the attorneys have entered the government sector and do not practice law—seldom giving thought to practicing in the private sector. Pursuant to the Resolution of the National Assembly No. 024 / NA (On the Adoption of the Law on Lawyers; November 9, 2016), requirements include possessing a baccalaureate degree, being a Laos citizen and passing an examination (separate requirements exist for foreign lawyers). While the Laos Bar Association issues certificates to graduates of the legal profession, it is the Ministry of Justice of Laos that sets the legal training standards.

== Governments ==
Government	Prime Minister	Took office	Left office	Elections	Legislature
1st	Kaysone Phomvihane	8 December 1975	1 June 1989	—	1st Supreme People's Assembly
2nd	Kaysone Phomvihane	1 June 1989	15 August 1991	26 March 1989	2nd Supreme People's Assembly
2nd	Khamtai Siphandon	15 August 1991	25 February 1993	—	2nd Supreme People's Assembly
3rd	Khamtai Siphandon	25 February 1993	24 February 1998	20 December 1992	3rd National Assembly
4th	Sisavath Keobounphanh	24 February 1998	27 March 2001	21 December 1997	4th National Assembly
4th	Bounnhang Vorachith	27 March 2001	30 September 2002	—	4th National Assembly
5th	Bounnhang Vorachith	30 September 2002	8 June 2006	24 February 2002	5th National Assembly
6th	Bouasone Bouphavanh	8 June 2006	23 December 2010	30 April 2006	6th National Assembly
6th	Thongsing Thammavong	23 December 2010	15 June 2011	—	6th National Assembly
7th	Thongsing Thammavong	15 June 2011	20 April 2016	30 April 2011	7th National Assembly
8th	Thongloun Sisoulith	20 April 2016	22 March 2021	20 March 2016	8th National Assembly
9th	Phankham Viphavanh	22 March 2021	22 March 2021	21 February 2021	9th National Assembly

== See also ==
- 2021 Laotian parliamentary election
- Central Committee of the Lao People's Revolutionary Party
- Crime in Laos
- Elections in Laos
- Kaysone Phomvihane Thought
- List of political parties in Laos
- Politburo of the Lao People's Revolutionary Party
- Lao Front for National Development
- Propaganda and Training Board
