= Minister of Defense (Laos) =

- ລັດຖະມົນຕີກະຊວງປ້ອງກັນປະເທດ (Lao)
- Incumbent; Khamlieng Outhakaysone since November 2024
- Ministry of Defense
- Member of: Lao People's Revolutionary Party the Government
- Reports to: Prime Minister
- Formation: 2 December 1975
- First holder: Khamtai Siphandone
- Website: Official website

The Minister of Defense (Lao: ລັດຖະມົນຕີກະຊວງປ້ອງກັນປະເທດ, romanized: ladthamonti kasuangpongkanpathed) is the head of the Ministry of Defense and is responsible for the Lao People's Armed Forces.

== List of officeholders ==
=== Kingdom of Laos (1953–1975) ===
No.	Portrait	Name (Born-Died)	Term of office			Monarch(s)	Ref.
No.	Portrait	Name (Born-Died)	Took office	Left office	Time in office	Monarch(s)	Ref.
		Phoui Sananikone (1903–1983)				Sisavang Vong	
		Kou Voravong (1914–1954)	21 November 1953	18 September 1954 X	301 days	Sisavang Vong	
		Souvanna Phouma (1901–1984)	18 September 1954	1958	3–4 years	Sisavang Vong	
		Major General; Phoumi Nosavan (1920–1985)	1959	1960	0–1 years	Sisavang Vatthana	
		Souvanna Phouma (1901–1984)	1962	1974	11–12 years	Sisavang Vatthana	
		Sisouk na Champassak (1928–1985)	1974	May 1975	0–1 years	Sisavang Vatthana	

=== Lao People's Democratic Republic (1975–present) ===
No.	Portrait	Name (Born-Died)	Term of office			Government	Ref.
No.	Portrait	Name (Born-Died)	Took office	Left office	Time in office	Government	Ref.
1		Khamtai Siphandone (1924–2025)	2 December 1975	15 August 1991	15 years, 256 days	Government I–II	
2		Choummaly Sayasone (born 1936)	15 August 1991	27 March 2001	9 years, 224 days	Government II–III–IV	
3		Douangchay Phichit (1944–2014)	27 March 2001	17 May 2014 †	13 years, 51 days	Government IV–V–VI–VII	
4		Sengnuan Xayalath	17 May 2014	20 April 2016	1 year, 339 days	Government VII	
5		Chansamone Chanyalath (born 1948)	20 April 2016	November 2024	10 years, 209 days	Government VIII–IX	
6		Khamlieng Outhakaysone	November 2024	Incumbent	1 year, 352 days		
