= 5th Government of Laos =

- 2002–2006
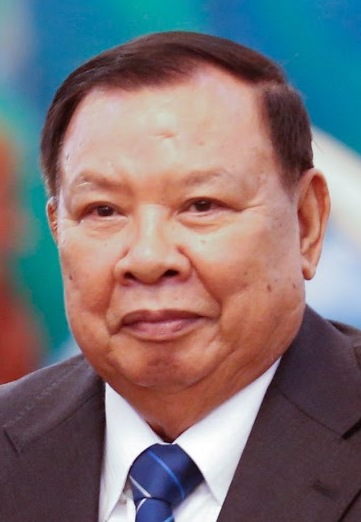
- Bounnhang Vorachith
- Date formed: 30 September 2002
- Date dissolved: 8 June 2006

People and organisations
- President: Khamtai Siphandon
- Prime Minister: Bounnhang Vorachith
- Deputy Prime Minister: Thongloun Sisoulith; Somsavat Lengsavad; Asang Laoli
- Member party: Lao People's Revolutionary Party

History
- Election: 2002 Election of Deputies
- Legislature term: 5th National Assembly
- Predecessor: Fourth
- Successor: Sixth

The Fifth Government of the Lao People's Democratic Republic was established on 30 September 2002.

== Ministries ==
Ministry	Minister	Took office	Left office
Prime Minister	Bounnhang Vorachith	30 September 2002	8 June 2006
Deputy Prime Minister	Thongloun Sisoulith	30 September 2002	8 June 2006
Deputy Prime Minister and Minister of Foreign Affairs	Somsavat Lengsavad	30 September 2002	8 June 2006
Deputy Prime Minister	Asang Laoli	30 September 2002	8 June 2006
Deputy Prime Minister	Bouasone Bouphavanh	23 October 2003	8 June 2006
Minister of National Defense	Douangchay Phichit	30 September 2002	8 June 2006
Minister of Finance	Chansy Phosikham	30 September 2002	8 June 2006
Minister of Interior	Soudchai Thammasith	30 September 2002	8 June 2006
Ministry of Justice	Khamouane Boupha	30 September 2002	8 June 2006
Minister of Agriculture and Forestry	Siane Saphanthong	30 September 2002	8 June 2006
Minister of Communications, Transport, Post and Construction	Bouathong Vonglokham	30 September 2002	8 June 2006
Minister of Industry and Handicrafts	Onneua Phommachanh	30 September 2002	8 June 2006
Minister of Commerce and Tourism	Soulivong Daravong	30 September 2002	8 June 2006
Minister of Labour and Social Welfare	Somphanh Phengkhammy	30 September 2002	8 June 2006
Minister of Education	Phimmasone Leuangkhamma	30 September 2002	8 June 2006
Minister of Public Health	Ponemekh Daraloy	30 September 2002	8 June 2006

== Committees and others ==
Ministry	Minister	Took office	Left office
President of the Committee for Planning and Investment	Thongloun Sisoulith	30 September 2002	8 June 2006
Head of the Office of the President	Soubanh Srithirath	30 September 2002	8 June 2006
Head of the National Tourism Authority	Cheng Sayavong	30 September 2002	8 June 2006
Governor of the Central Bank	Bounsong Sommalavong	30 September 2002	8 June 2006
