= 8th Government of Laos =

- 2016–2021
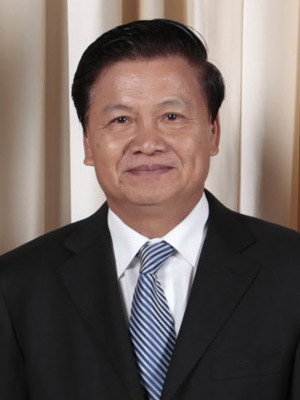
- Thongloun Sisoulith
- Date formed: 20 April 2016
- Date dissolved: 22 March 2021

People and organisations
- President: Bounnhang Vorachith
- Prime Minister: Thongloun Sisoulith
- Deputy Prime Minister: Bounthong Chitmany; Sonexay Siphandone; Somdy Douangdy
- Member party: Lao People's Revolutionary Party

History
- Election: 2016 Election of Deputies
- Legislature term: 8th National Assembly
- Predecessor: Seventh
- Successor: Ninth

The Eighth Government of the Lao People's Democratic Republic was elected by the 1st Ordinary Session of the 8th National Assembly on 20 April 2016. Its replacement, the 9th Government, was elected on 22 March 2021 at the 1st Ordinary Session of the 9th National Assembly.

== Ministries ==
Ministry	Minister	Took office	Left office
Prime Minister	Thongloun Sisoulith	20 April 2016	22 March 2021
Deputy Prime Minister	Bounthong Chitmany	20 April 2016	22 March 2021
Deputy Prime Minister	Sonexay Siphandone	20 April 2016	22 March 2021
Deputy Prime Minister; Minister of Finance	Somdy Douangdy	20 April 2016	22 March 2021
Ministry of Agriculture and Forestry	Lien Thikeo	20 April 2016	1 November 2020
Ministry of Agriculture and Forestry	Phet Phomphiphak	1 November 2020	22 March 2021
Minister of Education and Sports	Sengduean Lachanthaboun	20 April 2016	22 March 2021
Minister of Energy and Mines	Khammany Inthirath	20 April 2016	22 March 2021
Minister of Foreign Affairs	Saleumxay Kommasith	20 April 2016	22 March 2021
Minister of Home Affairs	Khammanh Sounvileuth	20 April 2016	1 November 2020
Minister of Home Affairs	Thongchan Manixay	1 November 2020	22 March 2021
Minister of Health	Bounkong Sihavong	20 April 2016	22 March 2021
Minister of Industry and Commerce	Khemmany Pholsena	20 April 2016	22 March 2021
Minister of Information, Culture and Tourism	Bosengkham Vongdara	20 April 2016	22 March 2021
Minister of Justice	Xaysy Santivong	20 April 2016	22 March 2021
Minister of Labour and Social Welfare	Khampheng Saysompheng	20 April 2016	22 March 2021
Minister of National Defense	Lieutenant General Chansamone Chanyalath	20 April 2016	22 March 2021
Ministry of Natural Resources and Environment	Sommat Pholsena	20 April 2016	22 March 2021
Minister of Planning and Investment	Souphanh Keomisay	20 April 2016	22 March 2021
Minister of Post, Telecommunications and Communications	Thansamay Kommasith	20 April 2016	22 March 2021
Minister of Public Security	Major General Somkeo Silavong	20 April 2016	5 December 2018
Minister of Public Security	Major General Vilay Lakhamfong	5 December 2018	22 March 2021
Minister of Public Works and Transport	Bounchanh Sinthavong	20 April 2016	22 March 2021
Minister of Science and Technology	Boviengkham Vongdara	20 April 2016	22 March 2021
Minister in the Office of the Prime Minister	Phet Phomphiphak	20 April 2016	1 November 2020
Minister in the Office of the Prime Minister	Bounkeuth Sangsomsack	20 April 2016	22 March 2021
Minister in the Office of the Prime Minister	Alounkeo Kittikhoun	20 April 2016	22 March 2021
Minister in the Office of the Prime Minister	Souvanpheng Bouphanouvong	20 April 2016	22 March 2021

== Committee heads ==
Ministry	Minister	Took office	Left office
Head of the Anti-Corruption Authority	Bounthong Chitmany	20 April 2016	Incumbent
Head and Minister of the Office of the President	Khammeung Phongthady	20 April 2016	22 March 2021
Head and Minister to the Office of the Prime Minister	Chaleun Yiapaoher	20 April 2016	1 November 2020
Head and Minister to the Office of the Prime Minister	Khamchen Vongphosy	1 November 2020	22 March 2021
Governor of the Bank of the Lao P.D.R.	Somphao Faisith	20 April 2016	22 March 2021
President of the State Inspection Authority	Bounthong Chitmany	20 April 2016	22 March 2021
