= President of Laos =

Head of state

President of the Lao People's Democratic Republic
- ປະທານປະເທດ ແຫ່ງ ສປປ ລາວ
- National Emblem

- National Flag

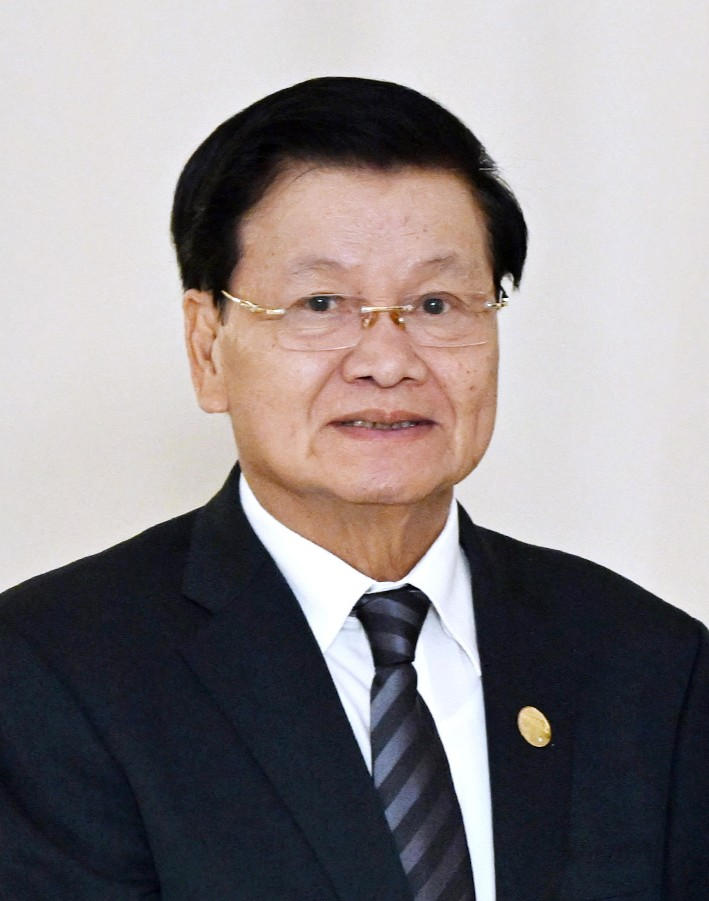
- Incumbent; Thongloun Sisoulith since 22 March 2021
- Executive organ of the State; Office of the Presidency
- Style: His Excellency
- Type: Head of state
- Member of: LPRP Central Committee; LPRP Politburo; LPRP Secretariat; LPRP Defence Commission
- Residence: Presidential Palace, Vientiane
- Seat: Vientiane
- Nominator: Lao People's Revolutionary Party
- Appointer: National Assembly
- Term length: Five years, renewable once
- Constituting instrument: Constitution of Laos (1991)
- Inaugural holder: Souphanouvong
- Formation: 2 December 1975 (50 years ago)
- Deputy: Vice President
- Salary: ₭1,170,000 monthly (US$53)

The president of the Lao People's Democratic Republic is the head of state of Laos. The current president is Thongloun Sisoulith, since 22 March 2021. He was previously elected as the General Secretary of the Lao People's Revolutionary Party, Laos' most powerful position in January 2021, ranking him first in the Politburo.

== History ==
=== Background ===
The office of the President of the People's Democratic Republic traces its lineage back to Prince Souphanouvong, the first President of the People's Democratic Republic, a member of the deposed royal family and one of the Three Princes, who became President when the former Kingdom of Laos was overthrown by the Pathet Lao in 1975, at the end of the Laotian Civil War.

== Duties and rights ==
=== Term limits ===
The president is elected by the National Assembly for a term of five years, and may serve no more than two terms consecutively. A candidate must receive at least two-thirds support from lawmakers present and voting in order to be elected.

=== Role and authority ===
The president represents Laos internally and externally, supervises the work as well as preserving the stability of the national governmental system and safeguards the independence and territorial integrity of the country. The President appoints the prime minister, vice president, ministers and other officials with the consent of the National Assembly. Additionally, the President is the commander-in-chief of the Lao People's Armed Forces.

However, as Laos is a one party communist state, the highest and most powerful political position is the General Secretary of the Lao People's Revolutionary Party, not the President. The general secretary controls the Politburo and the Secretariat, Laos' top decision-making bodies, making the officeholder as de facto leader of Laos. For most of the time since 1998, the general secretary has also served concurrently as president. As such, the president derives most of his power from his post as general secretary. The resulting power structure is roughly similar to that of China, where the paramount leader usually serves as president, but derives almost all of his power from his post as party leader.

Since Laos is a one-party state, all the presidents of the People's Democratic Republic have been members of the party while holding office.

== List of presidents ==
No.	Portrait	Name (Birth–Death)	Term of office			Election	Prime minister(s)
No.	Portrait	Name (Birth–Death)	Took office	Left office	Time in office	Election	Prime minister(s)
1		Souphanouvong ສຸພານຸວົງ (1909–1995)	2 December 1975	29 October 1986	10 years, 331 days	None	Kaysone Phomvihane
–		Phoumi Vongvichit ພູມີ ວົງວິຈິດ (1909–1994); Acting	29 October 1986	15 August 1991	4 years, 290 days	None	Kaysone Phomvihane
2		Kaysone Phomvihane ໄກສອນ ພົມວິຫານ (1920–1992)	15 August 1991	21 November 1992	1 year, 98 days	1989	Khamtai Siphandone
3		Nouhak Phoumsavanh ໜູຮັກ ພູມສະຫວັນ (1910–2008)	25 November 1992	24 February 1998	5 years, 91 days	None	Khamtai Siphandone
4		Khamtai Siphandone ຄຳໄຕ ສີພັນດອນ (1924–2025)	24 February 1998	8 June 2006	8 years, 104 days	1997	Sisavath Keobounphanh
4		Khamtai Siphandone ຄຳໄຕ ສີພັນດອນ (1924–2025)	24 February 1998	8 June 2006	8 years, 104 days	2002	Bounnhang Vorachit
5		Choummaly Sayasone ຈູມມະລີ ໄຊຍະສອນ (born 1936)	8 June 2006	20 April 2016	9 years, 317 days	2006	Bouasone Bouphavanh
5		Choummaly Sayasone ຈູມມະລີ ໄຊຍະສອນ (born 1936)	8 June 2006	20 April 2016	9 years, 317 days	2011	Thongsing Thammavong
6		Bounnhang Vorachit ບຸນຍັງ ວໍລະຈິດ (born 1937)	20 April 2016	22 March 2021	4 years, 336 days	2016	Thongloun Sisoulith
7		Thongloun Sisoulith ທອງລຸນ ສີສຸລິດ (born 1945)	22 March 2021	Incumbent	5 years, 178 days	2021	Phankham Viphavanh
7		Thongloun Sisoulith ທອງລຸນ ສີສຸລິດ (born 1945)	22 March 2021	Incumbent	5 years, 178 days	2026	Sonexay Siphandone

== See also ==
- List of monarchs of Laos
- Prime Minister of Laos
- Vice President of Laos
