= 9th Government of Laos =

- Emblem of Laos

22 March 2021 – (4 years, 302 days) Overview
- Type: Session of the Government of Laos
- Election: 21 February 2021

Members
- Total: 17 ministers

The 9th Government of the Lao People's Democratic Republic was elected by the 1st Session of the 9th National Assembly on 22 March 2021.

== Government ==
Rank	Office	Name	Akson Lao	8th GOV	Took office	Left office	Duration
1	Prime Minister of Laos	Phankham Viphavanh		New	22 March 2021	December 2022	4 years and 302 days
2	Deputy Prime Minister of Laos and Minister of National Defence	Chansamone Chanyalath		Old	22 March 2021	Incumbent	4 years and 302 days
3	Deputy Prime Minister of Laos and Minister of Planning and Investment (now PM)	Sonexay Siphandone		Old	22 March 2021	Incumbent	4 years and 302 days
4	Deputy Prime Minister of Laos	Kikeo Khaykhamphithoune		New	22 March 2021	Incumbent	4 years and 302 days
5	Minister of Public Security	Vilay Lakhamfong		Old	22 March 2021	Incumbent	4 years and 302 days
6	Minister of Foreign Affairs	Saleumxay Kommasith		Old	22 March 2021	Incumbent	4 years and 302 days
7	Minister of Industry and Commerce	Khampheng Saysompheng		New	22 March 2021	Incumbent	4 years and 302 days
8	Minister and Head of Prime Minister's Office	Khamchen Vongphosy		Old	22 March 2021	Incumbent	4 years and 302 days
9	Minister of Technology and Telecommunications	Boviengkham Vongdara		Old	22 March 2021	Incumbent	4 years and 302 days
10	Minister of Agriculture and Forestry	Phet Phomphiphak		Old	22 March 2021	Incumbent	4 years and 302 days
11	Minister of Natural Resources and Environment	Bounkham Vorachit		New	22 March 2021	Incumbent	4 years and 302 days
12	Governor of the Bank of the Lao PDR	Sonexay Sithphaxay		New	22 March 2021	Incumbent	4 years and 302 days
13	Minister of Labour and Social Welfare	Baykham Khattiya		New	22 March 2021	Incumbent	4 years and 302 days
14	Minister of Information, Culture and Tourism	Suanesavanh Vignaket		New	22 March 2021	Incumbent	4 years and 302 days
15	Minister of Finance	Bounchom Oubonpaseuth		New	22 March 2021	Incumbent	4 years and 302 days
16	Minister of Public Works and Transport	Viengsavath Siphandone		New	22 March 2021	Incumbent	4 years and 302 days
17	Minister of Education and Sports	Phouth Simmalavong		New	22 March 2021	Incumbent	4 years and 302 days
18	Minister of Health	Bounfeng Phoummalaysith		New	22 March 2021	Incumbent	4 years and 302 days
19	Minister of Justice	Phaivy Siboualipha		New	22 March 2021	Incumbent	4 years and 302 days
20	Minister of Home Affairs	Thongchanh Manixay		Old	22 March 2021	Incumbent	4 years and 302 days
21	Minister of Energy and Mines	Daovong Phonekeo		New	22 March 2021	Incumbent	4 years and 302 days
