= New Economic Mechanism (Laos) =

New Economic Mechanism(Lao: ຈິນຕະນາການໃໝ່, romanized: Chintanakan Mai, lit. 'New Imagination'; or Lao: ການປ່ຽນແປງໃໝ່, Romanized: Kanpianpaeng Mai) is a market economic policies announced by the Lao People's Revolutionary Party during its 4th national congress in 1986. The policy was focused on decentralized government control and encouraged private enterprise alongside state-owned enterprises.

== Background ==
The Lao People's Democratic Republic was formed on 2 December 1975 after the victory of Pathet Lao in the Laotian Civil War，The country would later undergo socialist transition that lasted from 1975 until 1979. From 1979 to 1986, Laos adopted the Soviet Union style central planning as a basis of its economic policies. However, due to the need of bringing the country back into the global stage and economic stagnation, Laotian leader Kaysone Phomvihane announced economic reform in 1986 during the 4th party congress, following the tide of the Chinese and Vietnamese counterparts.

The Lao People's Revolutionary Party believes that Laos is currently in a long process of "moving towards socialism ". Throughout the period of moving towards socialism, the Lao People's Revolutionary Party is a faithful representative of the rights and interests of the Lao working class, the working people and the entire nation. The party's purpose is to lead the Lao people to implement a principled and comprehensive reform line, maintain national security and stability, build a people's democratic system along the socialist goals, and build Laos into a peaceful, independent, democratic, unified and prosperous country.

After its announcement, the Laotian government begin to introduce series of deregulations such as the following:

- Price liberalization for selected sectors
- Liberalization for agricultural price which abolished state monopoly
- Increased autonomy for public enterprises and privatization
- Unification of exchange rate systems
- Foreign investment liberalization policies

== See also ==
- New Thinking (Laos)
- Kaysone Phomvihane Thought
- Similar processes in other countries:
  - Đổi Mới
  - Infiraj
  - Infitah
  - Reform and opening up
