= Khamseng Sivilai =

Head of the LPRP Central Committee Organisation Commission

1st term
- In office 1955–1957
- General Secretary: Kaysone Phomvihane
- Preceded by: Post established
- Succeeded by: Sisomphone Lovansay

Personal details
- Party: Lao People's Party

Khamseng Sivilai (Lao: ຄໍາແສງ ສີວິໄລ; born ? – died ?) was a lowland Lao politician and member of the Lao People's Revolutionary Party (LPRP). He attended the founding congress of what would later become the Lao People's Party (later Lao People's Revolutionary Party) and was elected as one of five members of the 1st Central Executive Committee.

He also served as the party's first leader of organizational work from 25 March 1955 to February 1957.
