= 12th Central Committee of the Lao People's Revolutionary Party =

Highest organ since 2026

The 12th Central Committee (12th CC), officially stylised as XII Central Committee of the Lao People's Revolutionary Party (LPRP), is composed of 73 members and 15 alternates. It was elected by the 12th National Congress on 8 January 2026. It convened for its 1st Plenary Session on the last day of the 12th National Congress, and elected the general secretary, the permanent member of the Secretariat, and the inspection commission chair as well as the 12th Politburo, 12th Secretariat, and the 12th Inspection Commission.

== Plenums ==
| Plenum | Start–end | Length | Ref |
|---|---|---|---|
| 1st Plenary Session | 8 January 2026 | 1 day | |

== Composition ==
=== Members ===
Members of the 12th Central Committee of the Lao People's Revolutionary Party
| Listing | Name | 11th CC | | Birth | PM | Gender | Ref. |
| Listing | Name | Change | Listing | Birth | PM | Gender | Ref. |
|---|---|---|---|---|---|---|---|
| 1 | Thongloun Sisoulith (General-Secretary & President) | Member | 1 | 1945 | | Male | |
| 2 | Xaysomphone Phomvihane (Chairman of National Assembly) | Member | 5 | 1956 | | Male | |
| 3 | Sonexay Siphandone (Prime-minister) | Member | 9 | 1966 | | Male | |
| 4 | Khamphanh Phommathat | Member | 7 | 1955 | | Male | |
| 5 | Kikeo Khaykhamphithoune | Member | 10 | 1957 | | Male | |
| 6 | Vilay Lakhamfong | Member | 11 | 1958 | | Male | |
| 7 | Sisay Leudetmounsone | Member | 12 | 1958 | | Female | |
| 8 | Saleumxay Kommasith | Member | 13 | 1968 | | Male | |
| 9 | Khamphanh Pheuyavong | Member | 14 | 1957 | | Male | |
| 10 | Anouphab Tounalom | Member | 15 | 1958 | | Male | |
| 11 | Thongsalith Mangnomek | Member | 16 | 1958 | | Male | |
| 12 | Sounthone Xayachack | Member | 17 | 1958 | | Female | |
| 13 | Viengthong Siphandone (Vice-president) | Member | 18 | 1963 | | Female | |
| 14 | Kongkeo Xaysongkham | Member | 28 | | | Male | |
| 15 | Sonethanou Thammavong | Member | 33 | | | Male | |
| 16 | Vilayvong Bouddakham | Member | 34 | | | Male | |
| 17 | Phet Phomphiphak | Member | 35 | | | Male | |
| 18 | Santiphab Phomvihane | Member | 38 | | | Male | |
| 19 | Bounkham Vorachit | Member | 39 | | | Female | |
| 20 | Buakhong Nammavong | Member | 40 | | | Male | |
| 21 | Baykham Khattiya | Member | 42 | | | Female | |
| 22 | Alounxay Sounnalath | Member | 43 | | | Male | |
| 23 | Suanesavanh Vignaket | Member | 44 | | | Female | |
| 24 | Phosay Sayasone | Member | 45 | | | Male | |
| 25 | Laopaoxong Navongxay | Member | 46 | | | Male | |
| 26 | Khamlieng Outhakaysone | Member | 48 | | | Male | |
| 27 | Bounchom Oubonpaseuth | Member | 49 | | | Male | |
| 28 | Khamphoy Vannasane | Member | 50 | | | Male | |
| 29 | Leklay Sivilay | Member | 51 | | | Male | |
| 30 | Khamlay Sipaseuth | Member | 53 | | | Male | |
| 31 | Vanxay Phongsavanh | Member | 55 | | | Male | |
| 32 | Aly Vongnorbountham | Member | 57 | | | Female | |
| 33 | Phaivy Siboualipha (Chief Justice) | Member | 58 | | | Male | |
| 34 | Phouvong Ounkhamsaen | Member | 59 | | | Male | |
| 35 | Bounchanh Sivongphanh | Member | 61 | | | Male | |
| 36 | Thongsavanh Phomvihane | Member | 62 | | | Male | |
| 37 | Xaysana Khotphouthone | Member | 63 | | | Male | |
| 38 | Atsaphangthong Siphandone | Member | 64 | | | Male | |
| 39 | Leeber Leebouapao | Member | 65 | | | Male | |
| 40 | Boutsady Thanameuang | Member | 66 | | | Female | |
| 41 | Pingkham Lasasimma | Member | 69 | | | Female | |
| 42 | Vanthong Kongmany | Member | 70 | | | Male | |
| 43 | Daovong Phonekeo | Member | 71 | | | Male | |
| 44 | Malaythong Kommasith | Alternate | 72 | | | Male | |
| 45 | Bounkhong Lachiemphone | Alternate | 73 | | | Male | |
| 46 | Vansy Kuamua | Alternate | 74 | | | Male | |
| 47 | Vilayvanh Bouddakham | Alternate | 75 | | | Male | |
| 48 | Linkham Douangsavanh | Alternate | 76 | | | Male | |
| 49 | Viengthavisone Thephachanh | Alternate | 77 | | | Male | |
| 50 | Monxay Laomuaxong | Alternate | 78 | | | Male | |
| 51 | Amphaivone Lombounpheng | Alternate | 79 | | | Female | |
| 52 | Leevong Laoly (Prosecutor-General) | Alternate | 80 | | | Female | |
| 53 | Phoykham Houngbounyuang | Nonmember | — | | | Male | |
| 54 | Somphone Mittaphone | Nonmember | — | | | Male | |
| 55 | Bounlai Boutthy | Nonmember | — | | | Male | |
| 56 | Bounleuam Manivong | Nonmember | — | | | Male | |
| 57 | Paenkham Boutchanpheng | Nonmember | — | | | Male | |
| 58 | Bounleua Phandanouvong | Nonmember | — | | | Male | |
| 59 | Santisouk Simmalavong | Nonmember | — | | | Male | |
| 60 | Thongly Sisoulith | Nonmember | — | | | Male | |
| 61 | Phouthanouphet Xaysombath | Nonmember | — | | | Male | |
| 62 | Phoutphanh Keovongxay | Nonmember | — | | | Male | |
| 63 | Phengnilanh Khamphanpheng | Nonmember | — | | | Male | |
| 64 | Bountheung Douangsavanh | Nonmember | — | | | Male | |
| 65 | Khamking Phouilamanivong | Nonmember | — | | | Male | |
| 66 | Vongsone Inpanphim | Nonmember | — | | | Male | |
| 67 | Saichay Kommasith | Nonmember | — | | | Male | |
| 68 | Phakham Inseng | Nonmember | — | | | Male | |
| 69 | Khamlavanh Chanthalavanh | Nonmember | — | | | Male | |
| 70 | Thoummaly Vongphachanh | Nonmember | — | | | Female | |
| 71 | Soukkhamphet Heuangboutsy | Nonmember | — | | | Male | |
| 72 | Khonsavanh Somphaxay | Nonmember | — | | | Male | |
| 73 | Phoxay Khaykhamphithoune. | Nonmember | — | | | Male | |

=== Alternates ===
Alternates of the 12th Central Committee of the Lao People's Revolutionary Party
| Listing | Name | 11th | Birth | PM | Gender | Ref. |
|---|---|---|---|---|---|---|
| 1 | Valaxay Lengsavad | Nonmember | | | Male | |
| 2 | Daosavanh Kheuamixay | Nonmember | | | Male | |
| 3 | Mixay Phomkhe | Nonmember | | | Male | |
| 4 | Khammone Chanthachit | Nonmember | | | Male | |
| 5 | Soulivat Souvannachoumkham | Nonmember | | | Male | |
| 6 | Kongsavat Bounlieng | Nonmember | | | Male | |
| 7 | Chindavong Phosikham | Nonmember | | | Male | |
| 8 | Philaithong Chitmany | Nonmember | | | Male | |
| 9 | Vannaxay Xattakoun | Nonmember | | | Male | |
| 10 | Sonxay Chanyalath | Nonmember | | | Male | |
| 11 | Thanongxay Khoutphaythoune | Nonmember | | | Male | |
| 12 | Mina Sivilay | Nonmember | | | Female | |
| 13 | Bounthavy Sorsoukanh | Nonmember | | | Male | |
| 14 | Soulixay Phichit | Nonmember | | | Male | |
| 15 | Akhomdeth Vongsay | Nonmember | | | Male | |
