= 4th Government of Laos =

The Fourth Government of the Lao People's Democratic Republic was established on 24 February 1998.

== Ministries ==
Ministry	Minister	Took office	Left office
Prime Minister	Sisavath Keobounphanh	24 February 1998	27 March 2001
Prime Minister	Boungnang Volachit	27 March 2001	30 September 2002
Deputy Prime Minister	Boungnang Volachit	24 February 1998	27 March 2001
Deputy Prime Minister and Minister of Defense	Choummaly Sayasone	24 February 1998	30 September 2002
Deputy Prime Minister and Minister of Foreign Affairs	Somsavat Lengsavad	24 February 1998	30 September 2002
Deputy Prime Minister	Khamphoui Keoboualapha	24 February 1998	6 August 1999
Deputy Prime Minister	Thongloun Sisoulith	27 March 2001	30 September 2002
Minister of Finance	Khamphoui Keoboualapha	24 February 1998	6 August 1999
Minister of Finance	Boungnang Volachit	6 August 1999	27 March 2001
Minister of Finance	Soukanh Mahalath	27 March 2001	30 September 2002
Minister of Commerce	Phoumy Thipphavone	24 February 1998	30 September 2002
Minister of Communications, Transport, Posts, and Construction	Phao Bounnaphol	24 February 1998	30 September 2002
Ministry of Education, Sports and Fine Arts	Phimmasone Leuangkhamma	24 February 1998	30 September 2002
Minister of Interior	Asang Laoly	24 February 1998	9 April 2002
Minister of Interior	Soutchay Thammasith	9 April 2002	30 September 2002
Minister of Information and Culture	Sileua Bounkham	24 February 1998	30 September 2002
Minister of Industry and Handicrafts	Soulivong Daravong	24 February 1998	30 September 2002
Minister of Labor and Social Welfare	Somphanh Phengkhamrny	24 February 1998	30 September 2002
Minister of Justice	Khamouane Boupha	24 February 1998	30 September 2002
Minister of Public Health	Ponemek Daraloy	24 February 1998	30 September 2002
Minister of Agriculture and Forestry	Siene Saphangthong	24 February 1998	30 September 2002

=== Committees ===
Ministry	Minister	Took office	Left office
President of the Committee for Planning and Investment	Bouathong Vonglokham	24 February 1998	27 March 2001
President of the Committee for Planning and Investment	Thongloun Sisoulith	27 March 2001	30 September 2002
