= New Thinking (Laos) =

Reformist period of Laotian history

Chintanakan Mai
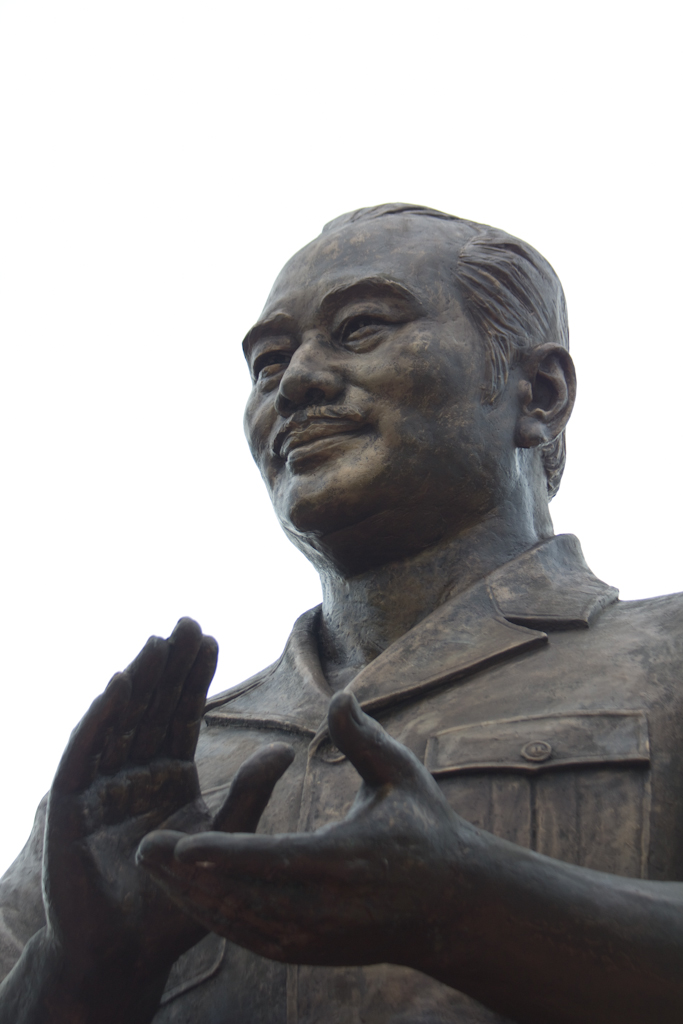
- Kaysone, the first leader of Laos
- Literal meaning: New thinking, new imagination
- First use: 1985

New Thinking (Lao: Chintanakan Mai) is a term and a slogan that refers to the reformist period of Laotian history from 1986 onward. It can be referred to as the Perestroika of Laos.

== Reforms ==
The term, in a limited sense, refers to the economic reforms initiated since 1985, and in a broader sense, it could refer to the social reforms during the time period. It was not intended as policy, but it was a slogan coined by Kaysone during the 4th National Congress of the Lao People's Revolutionary Party. It was a slogan that had been used to legitimize the New Economic Management Mechanism, despite the proclamation of "advancing Laos to socialism without going through the capitalist stage" at the 2nd Central Committee of the Lao People's Revolutionary Party.

== Legacy ==
The usage of the term disappeared almost entirely after the 1990s. It is commonly believed to have been a turning point within the history of the country by scholars. It was a period of cautious economic opening, and its impact would be felt on future policies, which would cite renovation, such as Laos' vision 2030.

== See also ==
- New Economic Mechanism (Laos)
- Pathet Lao
- Communism in Laos
- Kaysone Phomvihane Thought
