= Organisation Commission of the Lao People's Revolutionary Party =

Organisation Commission
- Formation: 25 March 1955
- Type: Board reporting to the Central Committee
- Location: Vientiane, Laos
- Head: Sisay Leudetmounsone
- Parent organization: Central Committee of the Lao People's Revolutionary Party
- Website: pccob.gov.la/

The Organisation Commission of the Lao People's Revolutionary Party (Lao: ພັກປະຊາຊົນປະຕິວັດລາວ ຄະນະຈັດຕັ້ງສູນກາງພັກ) Central Committee was established on 25 March 1955. It is responsible for organising and leading the party's organisation and personnel work.

The Head of the Central Committee Organisation Commission is by right of office member of the LPRP Central Committee. The current head, Sisay Leudetmounsone, is a member of the 11th Central Committee, 11th Politburo and the 11th Secretariat.

== Heads ==
No.	Name	Akson Lao	Took office	Left office	Gender	
1	Khamseng Sivilai	Akson Lao	ຄໍາແສງ ສີວິໄລ	25 March 1955	February 1957	Male
2	Sisomphone Lovansay	ສີສົມພອນ ລໍວັນໄຊ	February 1957	March 1964	Male	
3	Nouhak Phoumsavanh	ໜູຮັກ ພູມສະຫວັນ	March 1964	March 1972	Male	
4	Sisomphone Lovansay	ສີສົມພອນ ລໍວັນໄຊ	March 1972	March 1982	Male	
5	Samane Vignaket	ສະໝານ ວິຍະເກດ	March 1982	June 1989	Male	
6	Maichantan Sengmani	ໄມຈັນຕານ ແສງມະນີ	June 1989	February 1990	Male	
7	Oudom Khattigna	ອຸດົມ ຂັດຕິຍະ	February 1990	March 1991	Male	
8	Thongsing Thammavong	ທອງສິງ ທຳມະວົງ	March 1991	May 2002	Male	
9	Bounthong Chitmany	ບຸນທອງ ຈິດມະນີ	May 2002	2010	Male	
10	Chansy Phosikham	ຈັນສີ ໂພສີຄຳ	2010	2 February 2021	Male	
11	Sisay Leudetmounsone	ສີໃສ ລືເດດມູນສອນ	2 February 2021	Incumbent	Female	
