= 12th Secretariat of the Lao People's Revolutionary Party =

The 12th electoral term of the Secretariat (12th Secretariat) of the Central Committee of the Lao People's Revolutionary Party (LPRP) is composed of 11. It was elected by the 1st Plenary Session of the 12th Central Committee on 8 January 2026.

== Members ==
Members of the 12th Secretariat of the Lao People's Revolutionary Party
Listing	Name	11th	Birth	Gender	Ref.
1	Thongloun Sisoulith	Member	1945	Male	
2	Vilay Lakhamfong	Nonmember	1958	Male	
3	Sisay Leudetmounsone	Member	1958	Female	
4	Phet Phomphiphak	Nonmember	—	Male	
5	Vanxay Phongsavanh	Nonmember	—	Male	
6	Anouphab Tounalom	Member	1958	Male	
7	Sounthone Xayachack	Member	1958	Female	
8	Viengthong Siphandone	Member	—	Female	
9	Bounkham Vorachit	Nonmember	—	Female	
10	Vanthong Kongmany	Nonmember	—	Male	
11	Vongsone Inpanphim	Nonmember	—	Male	
