= Patuxai =

War memorial in Laos

- ປະຕູໄຊ
- Front view of the Patuxai in Vientiane

- Location within Laos
- Former names: Anousavary/Anousavali (Lao: ອານຸສາວະລີ)
- Alternative names: Patusai, Patousai, Patuxay
- Etymology: The Gate of Victory

General information
- Type: War Memorial
- Architectural style: Laotian
- Location: Vientiane, Laos, Lane Xang Avenue
- Coordinates: 17°58′14″N 102°37′07″E
- Elevation: 174 metres (571 feet)
- Current tenants: none
- Construction started: 1957; 69 years ago
- Completed: 1968; 58 years ago
- Inaugurated: 2010 (450th anniversary of Vientiane as capital of Laos)
- Cost: 63 million kips
- Client: Laos
- Owner: Government of Laos
- Landlord: none

Technical details
- Structural system: Concrete
- Floor count: Seven

Design and construction
- Architect: Tham Sayasithsena

Patuxai (Lao: ປະຕູໄຊ, pronounced [pā.tùː sáj] ; literally Victory Gate or Gate of Triumph, formerly the Anousavary or Anosavari Monument, known by the French as Monument Aux Morts) is a war monument in Downtown Vientiane, Laos, built between 1957 and 1968. The Patuxai was dedicated to those who fought in the struggle for independence from France. In romanizing the name from the Laotian language, it is variously transliterated as Patuxai, Patuxay, Patousai and Patusai. It is also called Patuxai Arch or the Arc de Triomphe of Vientiane as it resembles the Arc de Triomphe in Paris. However, it is Laotian in design, decorated with mythological creatures.

== History ==
Patuxai is a compound word, 'Patuu' or 'patu' meaning a "door" or "gateway" and 'Xai', derivative of the Sanskrit 'Jaya', which means "victory". Thus it means "Victory Gate" in English. The Patuxai was built during a turbulent period in Laotian history. Built when Laos was a constitutional monarchy, it was originally known as simply the "Anousavali" ("Monument"). It was dedicated in memory of the Laotian soldiers who died during World War II and the independence war from France in 1949.

The monument was built using funds and cement from the United States, which had intended Laos to build a new airbase that could be used by the US Air Force. However, the Royal Lao Government instead built the monument, which earned it the nickname of the "vertical runway".

The monument was designed by Laotian "soldier, former journalist and self-taught sculptor" Tham Sayasthsena. In 1957, his plans were selected from those submitted by the Public Works Department, the Military Engineering Department, and numerous private architects. Tham received 30,000 kips for his work. The cost of construction was estimated at 63 million kips.

In May 1975, the communist Pathet Lao overthrew the government and seized power, overthrowing King Sisavang Vatthana and ending the monarchy. The communists did not demolish the mounument; instead they renamed it Patuxai in honor of the victory that was handed to them by the People's Army of Vietnam.

== Geography ==
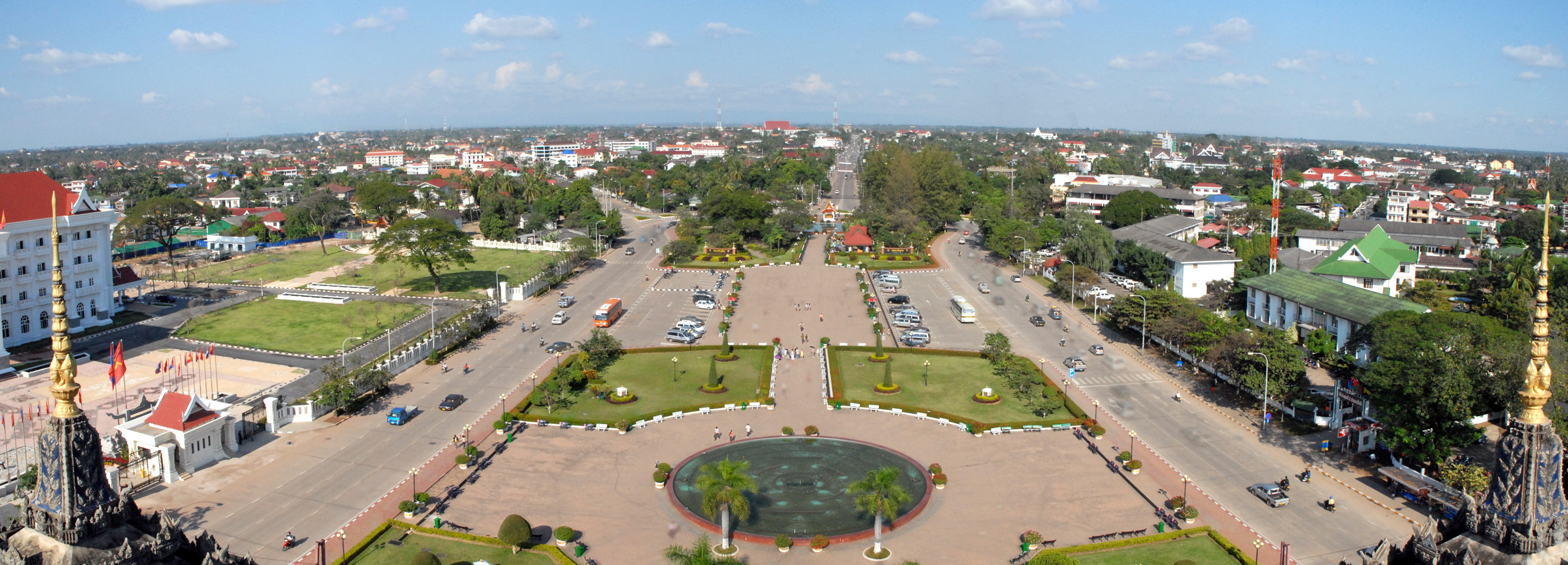
View of the city from Patuxai (before 2024 renovation)

The Patuxai is at the end of Lane Xang Avenue in the heart of Vientiane. Patuxay Park surrounds the monument.

== Architecture ==
The central cloister vault at the ground level is decorated with depictions of the gods Vishnu, Brahma, and Indra from left to right

The monument has five towers that represent the five principles of coexistence among nations of the world. They are also representative of the five Buddhist principles of “thoughtful amiability, flexibility, honesty, honor and prosperity”.

Archway

The monument has gateways on four sides oriented towards the four cardinal directions. The east–west gateways open to the Lane Xang Avenue, which is used during ceremonial national parades. In front of each gate, there is a pond. The four ponds represent the open section of a lotus flower (representing reverence of Laotians to the brave warriors of the nation). The four corners of the gateways are adorned by statues of a Naga King (mythical symbol of Laos), with a depiction signifying spraying of a jet of water (suggesting nature, fertility, welfare and happiness) into the ponds on the ground. Two concrete staircases wind up from inside the main structure, passing through each floor, right up to the top of the monument. Viewing galleries are provided on the upper floors. The first floor has mainly the offices of the management of the monument; the kiosks dealing with tourist paraphernalia (artefacts, souvenirs and refreshments) are also housed on this floor. The second floor is an important area where a museum is housed, displaying statues and pictures of the iconic heroes and heroines of the country. The roof design is also inspired by Taj Mahal of India.

Complete view from the avenue with musical fountains

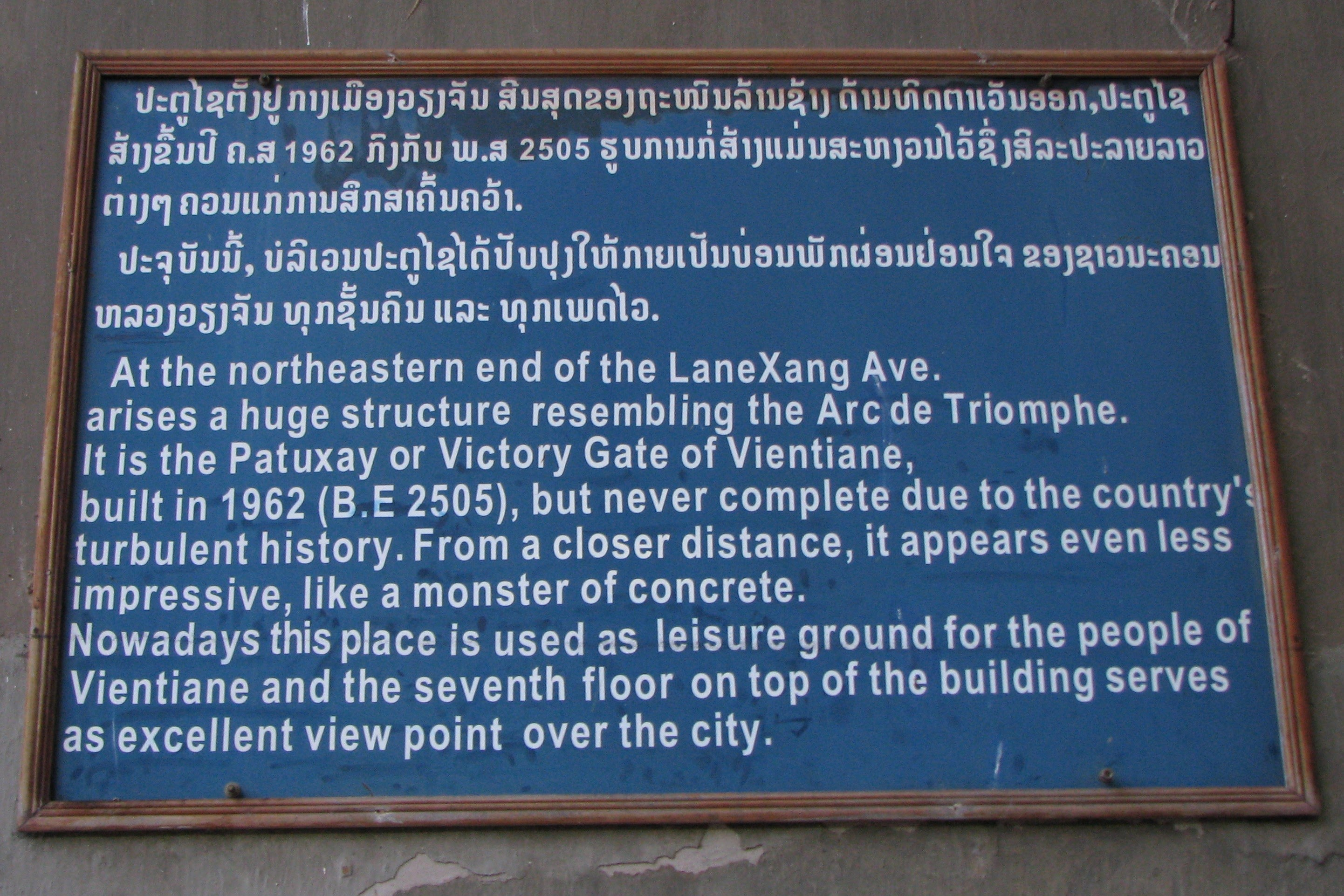
Patuxai (A very honest note)

The next level is an open space where four towers are built at the four corners. These towers have been decorated with frescoes of foliage. The towers are also fitted with electric lights, which are switched on during the national day and other important festivals. The small towers, with temple like ornamentation, are designed in the Laotian style and are provided with spires. Each tower has a stairway. Apart from the four corner towers, there is another central larger tower above this floor, which also has a staircase which leads to the top floor that has the viewing platform from where a panoramic view of Vientiane could be seen. A telescope is also fitted at that level to get a view of the city. Plans have been drawn to fit lifts from two diagonal corners of the monument, which are expected to be ready in 2010 when the 450th anniversary of Vientiane as the capital of Laos will be celebrated. On this occasion, the entire monument is proposed to be decorated with flowers and illuminated. The monumental building is not fully finished to this day, although the Laotian government have repeatedly authorized new funds.

The musical fountain system fitted in the newly developed elegant garden was donated by the Chinese. It is a popular feature for visitors and local people who visit the monuments in the afternoons.
