= Organization Commission =

Organization Commission may refer to:

- Organization Commission of the Lao People's Revolutionary Party
- Organization Commission of the Communist Party of Vietnam
