= Presidential Palace, Laos =

Coordinates: 17.962037°N 102.609880°E

Presidential Palace and gates

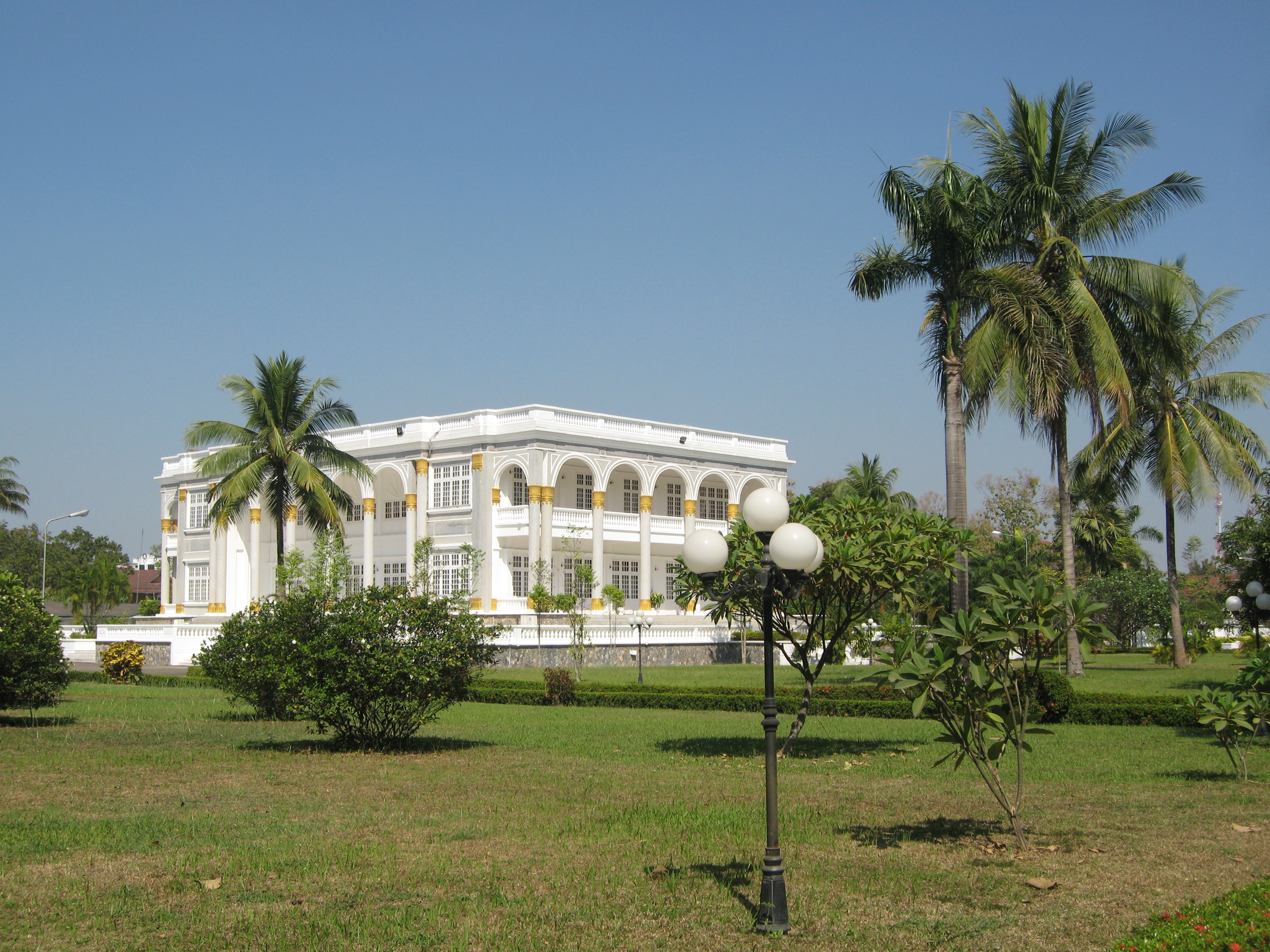
Presidential Palace

The Presidential Palace (Lao: ຫໍຄຳ, romanized: Hor Kham, lit. 'Golden Palace') is the official residence of the President of Laos, who, by convention, also holds the position of General Secretary of the Lao People's Revolutionary Party. It is located on the banks of the Mekong River in the capital city, Vientiane.

== History ==
Located near Sisaket Temple in the junction of Lane Xang Avenue and Settathirath Road, the building was first built in 1560 as a new royal residence by the orders of King Setthathirath. Meanwhile in 1973, it was first started by the then Royal Lao Government on the grounds that used to house the royal residence. It was designed by local architect Khamphoung Phonekeo but due to political change brought about by the takeover of the communist Pathet Lao in 1975, the building was not completed until much later. The Presidential Palace finally opened in 1986 and even then only as a venue for government functions and ceremonies. The building is closed to the public. It is a well-known landmark for its imposing yet elegant Beaux-Arts architecture complete with tall colonnades and shaded balconies. The building is surrounded by well-manicured lawns and gardens and fenced off by tall walls and a wrought iron gate. The Presidential Palace is not to be confused with the official home of the Lao president which is located in the Vientiane suburb of Ban Phonthan. The palace is lit up in the evening and offers a great opportunity for night photography.
