= Central Committee for National Defense and Security =

- ຄະນະກຳມະການປ້ອງກັນຊາດ-ປ້ອງກັນຄວາມສະຫງົບສູນກາງ
- Type: Board reporting to the Central Committee
- Location: Vientiane, Laos
- Chairman: Thongloun Sisoulith
- Parent organization: Central Committee of the Lao People's Revolutionary Party
- Website: ptc.gov.la

The Central Committee for National Defense and Security (alternatively referred to as the Defence and Public Security Commission) of the Lao People's Revolutionary Party's Central Committee (LPRP) is the supreme military-political leadership body of the Lao People's Armed Forces and Ministry of Public Security. It serves as a center for coordinating military forces, police, and local government agencies and is the highest decision-making institution regarding military and security affairs. The post of committee chairman is concurrently held by the General Secretary of the Lao People's Revolutionary Party, who serves as the de facto commander-in-chief of the Armed Forces.

== Key personnel ==
=== Officers ===
| Title | Name | Portrait | Ref. |
|---|---|---|---|
| Chairman (LPRP General Secretary) | Thongloun Sisoulith | | |
| Vice Chairman (Deputy Prime Minister and Minister of Defence) | General Khamlieng Outhakaysone | | |

=== Committee composition ===
| Title | Name | Portrait | Ref. |
|---|---|---|---|
| Deputy Prime Minister and Ministry of Public Security | General Vilay Lakhamfong | | |

== See also ==
- Central Military Commission (China)
- Central Military Commission of the Workers' Party of Korea
- Central Military Commission of the Communist Party of Vietnam
