= The Vietnamese Revolution: Fundamental Problems, Essential Tasks =

- Author: Le Duan
- Country: Socialist Republic of Vietnam
- Language: Vietnamese, English
- Publisher: Foreign Languages Publishing House, International Publishers Co., Inc.
- Published: 1970
- Published in English: 1970

The Vietnamese Revolution: Fundamental Problems, Essential Tasks is a speech and an analysis of the principles and methods of the Vietnamese revolution, and the path forward for the Communist Party of Vietnam and the Socialist Republic of Vietnam. The text, written by Le Duan, then the General Secretary of the Central Committee of the Communist Party of Vietnam and was written for the 40th founding anniversary of the Communist Party of Vietnam.

The text is the main ideological contribution by Le Duan to the ideology of the Communist Party of Vietnam. Selections from this text are part of the curriculum and study of Ho Chi Minh Thought. Like other publications by Le Duan, this text is a collection of speeches.
