= Lane Xang Avenue =

Street in Vientiane, Laos

ຖະໜົນລ້ານຊ້າງ Lane Xang Avenue
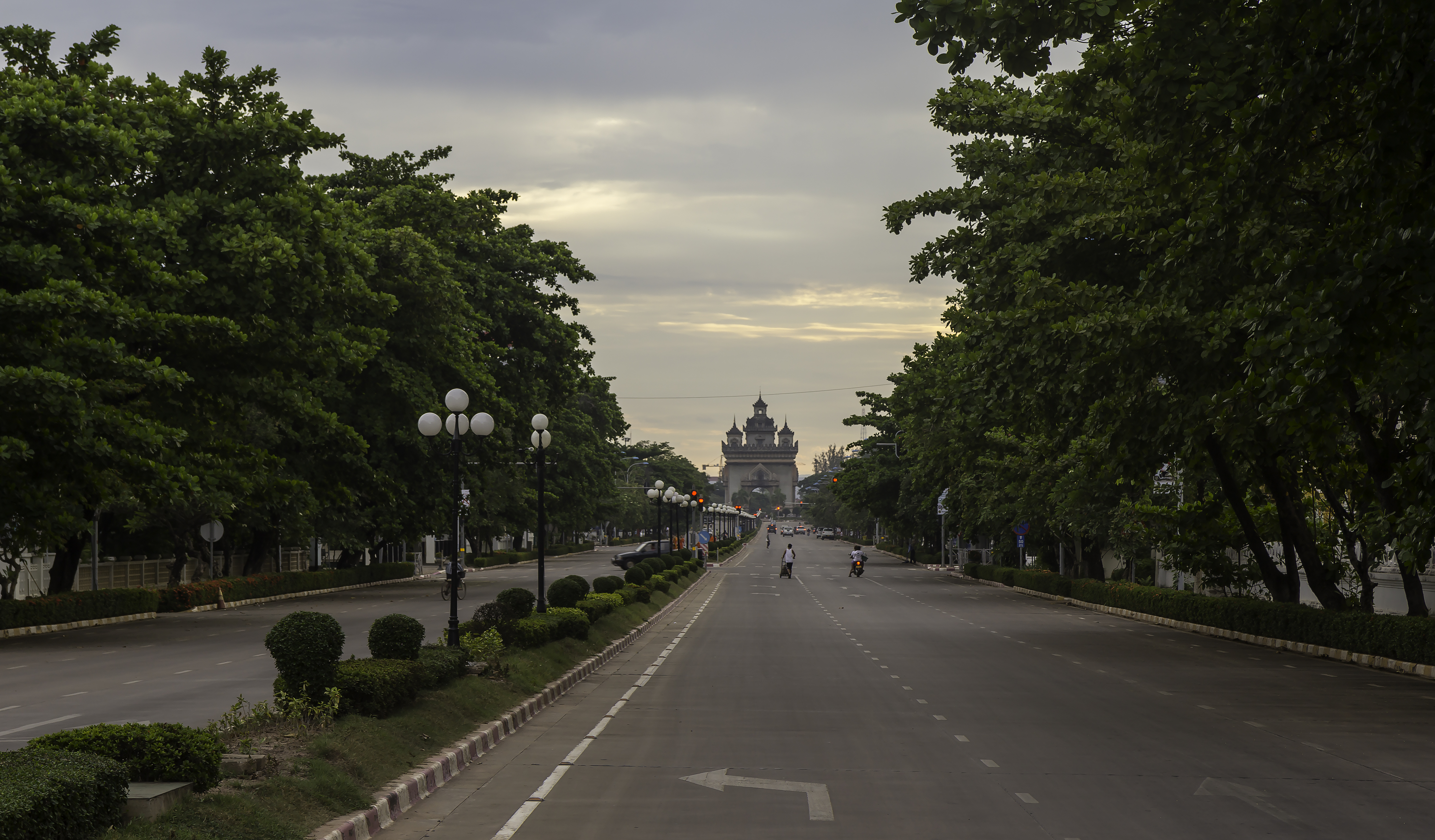
- View of the Lane Xang Avenue with the Patuxai Monument in the background
- Interactive map of ຖະໜົນລ້ານຊ້າງ; Lane Xang Avenue
- From: Presidential Palace, Laos
- To: Patuxai

Construction
- Completion: 1968

Lane Xang Avenue (Lao: ຖະໜົນລ້ານຊ້າງ) is the main and widest boulevard running through the centre of Vientiane, the capital of Laos. It is widely known as the main street of Vientiane, that connects several governmental and historical landmarks, including: Patuxai, Wat Si Saket and Presidential Palace.

== History ==
The avenue was constructed during the mid-20th century, under the former Royal Laos Government, during a period of urban planning and modernization following Laos’s independence from France in 1953 and the establishment of the communist state in 1975.

The name “Lane Xang” refers to the historic kingdom of Lan Xang Kingdom, literally meaning “Land of a Million Elephants.”
