= 1st Central Committee of the Lao People's Party =

The 1st Central Committee of the Lao People's Party (LPP) was elected at the 1st LPP National Congress in 1955. It was originally composed of five members but the number of members increased over the years.

== Members ==
=== Original ===
Rank	Name	Akson Lao	2nd CC	Gender
1	Kaysone Phomvihane	ໄກສອນ ພົມວິຫານ	Reelected	Male
2	Nouhak Phoumsavanh	ໜູຮັກ ພູມສະຫວັນ	Reelected	Male
3	Bun Phommahaxay		Not	Male
4	Sisavath Keobounphanh	ສີສະຫວາດ ແກ້ວບຸນພັນ	Reelected	Male
5	Khamseng Sivilai	ຄໍາແສງ ສີວິໄລ	Not	Male

=== Add-ons ===
Name	Akson Lao	Added	2nd CC	Gender
Souphanouvong	ສຸພານຸວົງ	May 1955	Reelected	Male
Phoumi Vongvichit	ພູມີ ວົງວິຈິດ	May 1955	Reelected	Male
Phoun Sipraseuth	ພູນ ສີປະເສີດ	May 1955	Reelected	Male
Khamsouk Saignaseng	ຄຳສຸກ ໄຊຍະແສງ	1956	Reelected	Male
Thit Mouan Saochanthala	ທິດມ່ວນ ສາວຈັນທະລາ	1956	Reelected	Male
Sisomphon Lovansay	ສີສົມພອນ ລໍວັນໄຊ	1956	Reelected	Male
Khamtai Siphandon	ຄໍາໄຕ ສີພັນດອນ	1956	Reelected	Male
Somseun Khampithoun	ຊົມຊື່ນ ຄຳພິທູນ	1956	Reelected	Male
Sanan Soutthichak	ສະນັ່ນ ສຸດທິຈັກ	1961	Reelected	Male
Phomma Douangmala		1961	Not	Male
Sali Vongkhamsao	ສາລີ ວົງຄໍາຊາວ	1963	Reelected	Male
