= Ministry of Industry and Commerce (Laos) =

Government ministry of Laos

- ກະຊວງອຸດສາຫະກຳແລະການຄ້າ
- Emblem of Laos

Ministry overview
- Jurisdiction: Government of Laos
- Headquarters: Vientiane Laos
- Minister responsible: Malaythong Kommasith, Minister of Industry and Commerce
- Website: lsp.moic.gov.la

The Ministry of Industry and Commerce (Lao: ກະຊວງອຸດສາຫະກຳແລະການຄ້າ) is the government ministry responsible for governing and developing industrial activity and commercial activity in Laos. It is responsible for regulating and promoting manufacturing, trade, import and export activity, and for representing Laos and Laotian interests in the international business community.

Ministry main offices are located in Vientiane.

As of 2022, the current Minister of Industry and Commerce is Malaythong Kommasith.

== See also ==
- Economy of Laos
- Government of Laos
- List of company registers
