= 1992 Laotian parliamentary election =

- 20 December 1992
- All 85 seats in the National Assembly
Party	Leader	Seats	+/–
LPRP	Khamtai Siphandone	85	+20
This lists parties that won seats. See the complete results below.
President before	President after
Nouhak Phoumsavanh; LPRP	Nouhak Phoumsavanh; LPRP

Parliamentary elections were held in Laos on 20 December 1992. They were the first held since the adoption of a permanent constitution a year earlier.

A total of 154 candidates contested the 85 seats, all but four of which were Lao People's Revolutionary Party members. However, all candidates were pre-screened by the LPRP, the dominant force in the Lao Front for National Construction, the only organization allowed to put forward candidates. The LPRP won all 85 seats. Voter turnout was reported to be 99.3%.

== Results ==
Party	Votes	%	Seats	+/–
Lao People's Revolutionary Party			85	+20
Independents			0	–14
Total			85	+6
Total votes	2,009,727	–		
Registered voters/turnout	2,024,756	99.26		
Source: Nohlen et al., IPU
