= 11th Secretariat of the Lao People's Revolutionary Party =

The 11th Secretariat of the Lao People's Revolutionary Party, officially the Secretariat of the 11th Central Committee of the Lao People's Revolutionary Party, was elected at the 1st Plenary Session of the 11th Central Committee in the immediate aftermath of the 11th National Congress in 2021.

== Members ==
Rank	Name	Akson Lao	10th	12th	Gender
1	Thongloun Sisoulith	ທອງລຸນ ສີສຸລິດ	Nonmember	Member	Male
2	Bounthong Chitmany	ບຸນທອງ ຈິດມະນີ	Member	Nonmember	Male
3	Khamphanh Phommathat	ຄໍາພັນ ພົມມະທັດ	Nonmember	Nonmember	Male
4	Sisay Leudetmounsone	ສີໃສ ລືເດດມູນສອນ	Nonmember	Member	Female
5	Khamphanh Pheuyavong	ຄໍາພັນ ເຜີຍຍະວົງ	Nonmember	Nonmember	Male
6	Anouphab Tounalom	ອານຸພາບ ຕຸນາລົມ	Nonmember	Member	Male
7	Thongsalith Mangnomek	ທອງສະລິດ ມັງໜໍ່ເມກ	Nonmember	Nonmember	Male
8	Sounthone Xayachack	ສູນທອນ ໄຊຍະຈັກ	Nonmember	Member	Female
9	Viengthong Siphandone	ວຽງທອງ ສີພັນດອນ	Nonmember	Member	Female
