= Soubanh Srithirath =

Laotian politician

Soubanh Srithirath (Lao: ສຸບັນ ສະຣິດທິຣາດ; 9 September 1936 – 17 July 2012) is a Laotian politician. He served as Minister to the President's Office in Laos and was chairman of the Lao Commission for Drug Control.
