= 1st National Congress of the Lao People's Party =

- An LPRP communist symbol
- Date: 22 March – 14 April 1955 (17 days)
- Participants: 20 delegates
- Outcome: The election of the 1st Central Committee

The 1st National Congress of the Lao People's Party (LPP) was held in Houaphanh on 22 March – 06 April 1955. The congress occurs once every five years. A total of 20 delegates attended the founding congress. In addition to the establishment of the Lao People's Party, its 1st Central Committee was elected at the congress with Kaysone Phomvihane as its General Secretary.
