= Alounkeo Kittikhoun =

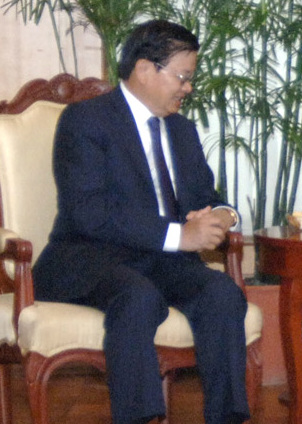

Vice Minister for Foreign Affairs of Laos
- Incumbent
- Assumed office 2011

Assistant Minister for Foreign Affairs of Laos
- In office 2007–2011

Chair of the UN Group of Landlocked Developing Countries
- In office 1999–2007

Lao Ambassador and Permanent Representative to the United Nations
- In office 1993–2007

Personal details
- Born: October 10, 1951 (age 74) Meuang Khong, Champassack Province, Laos

Alounkeo Kittikhoun (born October 10, 1951) is a Laotian diplomat and statesman. He served as Minister to the Prime Minister's Office from 2016 to 2020 and Vice Minister for Foreign Affairs of Laos, and was the country's ASEAN Senior Officials Meetings (SOM) Leader (the top representative within this forum). Prior to his Vice Ministerial role, Kittikhoun was Assistant Minister for Foreign Affairs (2007-2011). This position was preceded by his service as the Lao Ambassador and Permanent Representative to the United Nations in New York (1993-2007). Kittikhoun is noted for maintaining the longest length of service as a Lao diplomat, and is one of the longest-serving Ambassadors at the United Nations.

One of his most notable achievements is his leadership of the group of Landlocked Developing Countries (LLDCs), having served as Chair of the group at the United Nations from 1999 to 2007. He gained recognition for this group of countries, especially during the preparatory process and in the negotiations that led to the first-ever International Ministerial Conference of Landlocked and Transit Developing Countries, Donor Countries, and International Financial and Development Institutions on Transit Transport Cooperation, in 2003. The Conference adopted the Almaty Programme of Action, the blueprint for the international community to assist landlocked developing countries.

During his tenure at the United Nations, he was also Vice President of the UN General Assembly (50th Session in 1994), Chair of the Asian Group (1994, 2003 and 2006), Chair of the Special Political and Decolonization Committee (1996), Chair of the 18th Meeting of the State Parties to the International Convention on the Elimination of all Forms of Racial Discrimination (2000), Vice-President of the Executive Board of UNICEF (2001), President of the 12th session of the High Level Committee on Technical Cooperation among Developing Countries (2001), Co-Chair of the Working Group of the Intergovernmental Preparatory Committee for the 3rd UN Conference on Least Developed Countries (2001), and Chair of the ASEAN New York Committee (2004–2005).

In January 2024, he was appointed as ASEAN's special envoy to Myanmar.

== Honours ==
- The Order of the Rising Sun, Gold and Silver Star (2023)
