= 2026 Laotian parliamentary election =

- 22 February 2026
- All 175 seats in the National Assembly; 88 seats needed for a majority
Party	Leader	Seats	+/–
LPRP	Thongloun Sisoulith	169	+11
Independents	–	6	0
This lists parties that won seats. See the complete results below.
Prime minister before	Prime minister after
Sonexay Siphandone; LPRP	Sonexay Siphandone; LPRP

Parliamentary elections were held in Laos on 22 February 2026. Elections are held in a closed autocratic system and are not considered free or fair.

== Background ==
Laos is a one-party state ruled by the Lao People's Revolutionary Party (LPRP), the sole legal political party in the country. There is no organized opposition or independent civil society able to challenge the party's authority, and independent monitoring of elections is not permitted.

In the previous election held in 2021, the LPRP won 158 of the 164 seats in the National Assembly, with the remaining six seats filled by independent candidates vetted by the party. Ahead of the 2026 election, the size of the legislature was expanded to 175 seats.

Thongloun Sisoulith was re-elected as LPRP general secretary on 8 January 2026 at the concluding session of the 12th National Congress.

== Electoral system ==
The 175 members of the National Assembly are elected for five-year terms from 18 multi-member constituencies with between five and nineteen seats using the multiple non-transferable vote system. Candidates need to gain the support of a local authority or a mass organisation to run for office. In each constituency, voters vote for a list with as many candidates as there are seats to be filled, and the list with the most votes winning all of its seats. The seat distribution dependent on population; each province has a minimum of five seats, with one additional seat for every 50,000 inhabitants starting at 250,000 inhabitants, up to a maximum of 19 seats.

== Results ==
On 2 March Xinhua reported that vote counts had been finalized.

Party	Votes	%	Seats	+/–
Lao People's Revolutionary Party			169	+11
Independents			6	0
Total			175	+11
Total votes	4,660,050	–		
Registered voters/turnout	4,764,384	97.81		
