= Ponmek Dalaloy =

Laotian politician and physician

Ponmek Dalaloy (Lao: ປອນເມກ ດາລາລອຍ) is a Laotian physician and politician. He served as Minister of Public Health from 1993 to 2011.
