= Ministry of National Defence (Laos) =

Government ministry of Laos

- ກະຊວງປ້ອງກັນປະເທດ ແຫ່ງ ສປປ ລາວ (Lao)

Ministry overview
- Preceding ministry: Ministry of National Defence of the Kingdom of Laos
- Jurisdiction: Laos
- Headquarters: Kaysone Phomvihane Avenue, Vientiane, Laos
- Minister responsible: Khamlieng Outhakaysone, Minister of National Defence
- Website: www.mod.gov.la

The Ministry of National Defence of the Lao PDR (Lao: ກະຊວງປ້ອງກັນປະເທດ ແຫ່ງ ສປປ ລາວ) is the Laotian government ministry responsible for the Lao People's Armed Forces. It is led by the Laotian Minister of Defense. It also oversees various village militias.

For most of the tenure of the Lao PDR, the Minister of National Defence has been a general in the Armed Forces; for instance, in 1994, Choummali Saignason was simultaneously Minister of National Defence and Commander-in-Chief of the LPAF.

== History ==
The Ministry of National Defence was initially established under the Kingdom of Laos following the country's independence from France, overseeing the Royal Lao Armed Forces. By the outbreak of the Laotian Civil War in 1959, the Ministry had divided the country into five Military Regions, each with a responsible commander reporting directly to the Ministry. In the late 1960s, the Ministry implemented a Joint Operational Command to coordinate operations between its various services.

Durring the Battle of Vientiane in December 1960, the Ministry headquarters in the city, which was next door to the American embassy, came under fire. Talks were held in 1962 in an attempt to build a ceasefire and a coalition government with elements from both sides, during which the Pathet Lao demanded that the Minister be one of their own. Royalist General Phoumi Nosavan strongly opposed this, and the talks ultimately failed to produce a coalition government entirely.

Upon the reorganization of the Kingdom into the Lao People's Democratic Republic following the 1975 takeover of the Pathet Lao, the Kingdom's Minister of Defence Sisouk na Champassak was forced to leave the country and General Kham Ouane Boupha provisionally appointed Minister as the government and Ministry were reorganised.

In the 1980s, the military's primary mission shifted from providing defence to assisting in regional development. In 1981, the Corporation for Agro-Forestry Development and Service was established under the auspices of the Ministry, wth the Mountainous Areas Development Company being founded under the Ministry in 1984. By 1985, the LPAF had a monopoly on forestry in the country.

Since the 1990s, there has been strong cooperation between the Laotian and Vietnamese Ministries of National Defence to support modernisation and integration of military forces. For instance, the UNITEL telecommunications company is jointly owned by the Laotian (51%) and Vietnamese (49%) Ministry of National Defence (under Viettel).

== See also ==
- Government of Laos
- Politics of Laos
