= 1989 Laotian parliamentary election =

← 1972	26 March 1989	1992 →
- All 79 seats in the National Assembly
Party	Leader	Seats
LPRP	Kaysone Phomvihane	65
Independents	–	14
This lists parties that won seats. See the complete results below.
President before	President after
Phoumi Vongvichit (acting); LPRP	Phoumi Vongvichit (acting); LPRP

Parliamentary elections were held in Laos on 26 March 1989, the first since 1972, and the first since the Communist takeover in 1975.

A total of 121 candidates contested the 79 seats. All candidates had to be approved by the Lao Front for National Construction, dominated by the Communist Lao People's Revolutionary Party; around two-thirds of candidates were LPRP members. The LPRP won 65 seats, with independents whose candidacies had been approved by the Front taking the remainder. Voter turnout was reported to be 98.4%.

== Results ==
Party	Votes	%	Seats
Lao People's Revolutionary Party			65
Independents			14
Total			79
Registered voters/turnout		98.4	
Source: Nohlen et al.
