= Soutchay Thammasith =

Laotian politician

Major General Soutchay Thammasith became the minister of security of Laos in 2002, replacing Asang Laoly. Before becoming the security minister, he was the vice minister of the interior. He retired on February 17, 2005, citing health reasons.
