= 2006 Laotian parliamentary election =

- 30 April 2006
- All 115 seats in the National Assembly
Party	Leader	Seats	+/–
LPRP	Choummaly Sayasone	113	+4
Independents	–	2	+2
This lists parties that won seats. See the complete results below.
President before	President after
Khamtai Siphandone; LPRP	Choummaly Sayasone; LPRP

Parliamentary elections were held in Laos on 30 April 2006. The ruling Lao People's Revolutionary Party (LPRP) won 113 of the 115 seats in the sixth National Assembly.

== Campaign ==
A total of 175 candidates contested the 115 seats, of which 173 were members of the LPRP.

== Results ==
Graph of the party split among 115 seats.
Party	Votes	%	Seats	+/–
Lao People's Revolutionary Party			113	+4
Independents			2	+2
Total			115	+6
Total votes	2,819,904	–		
Registered voters/turnout	2,826,580	99.76		
Source: IPU
