= Kaysone Phomvihane Thought =

Political philosophy developed by and centered on Kaysone Phomvihane

Kaysone Phomvihane Thought (Lao: ແນວຄິດ ໄກສອນ ພົມວິຫານ, romanized: Aenuakhid Kaison Phomvihan) is a political ideology that builds upon Marxism–Leninism and Ho Chi Minh Thought with the political philosophy developed by Kaysone Phomvihane, the first leader of the Lao People's Revolutionary Party (LPRP). Its contents were codified and developed by the LPRP with help from the Vietnamese Communist Party, and it was first formalized by the LPRP at its 10th National Congress, held in 2016.

Kaysone Phomvihane Thought includes views on the basic issues of the Laotian Revolution, specifically the creative application and development of Marxism–Leninism to the material conditions of Laos as carried through peasants and workers' struggle against colonial, neocolonial and feudal-monarchical forces. It strives to build a socialist society without first passing through a capitalist stage; due to the underdevelopment of Laos, however, the LPRP, still under Phomvihane's direction, assumed a state capitalist line whereby the state and collective enterprises would play a major role in the economy, insisting that state capitalism, private ownership and individual economic activity would continue and be utilized by the people's democratic state for socialist construction.

== See also ==
- Mao Zedong Thought
- Xi Jinping Thought
- Ho Chi Minh Thought
- Left-wing nationalism
- National communism
- Juche
- New Thinking (Laos)
