= Ministry of Health (Laos) =

Government ministry of Laos

The Ministry of Health is the government ministry responsible for the governance and guidance of healthcare in Laos.
