= Constitution of Laos =

Supreme law of Laos

The Constitution of Laos is the communist state constitution of Laos. It specifies the functions and powers of the systems of state organs of the Lao People's Democratic Republic, and defines the rights and duties of citizens. The constitution was adopted on August 14, 1991, 16 years after the 1975 establishment of the Republic, a period during which the country functioned without a written constitution or published penal and criminal codes. The 1991 Constitution consisted of a Preamble and 80 Articles, and it legally established a set of authorities that resemble the traditional differentiation among executive, legislative, and judicial branches of government. Since the ratification of the 1991 Constitution, it has been amended three subsequent times in 2003, 2015 and 2025. The most recent series of amendments to the constitution were ratified on March 10th, 2025.

== Previous constitution ==
Laos' first constitution was drafted and adopted by the Lao Issara (Free Laos) government on October 12, 1945, containing 41 articles, with some of its articles inspired by the June 1932 provisional constitution of Thailand.

== Development of the 1991 constitution ==
On August 14, 1991, 16 years after the establishment of the LPDR, the Supreme People's Assembly (SPA), the country's highest legislative organ, adopted a constitution. While the SPA had been charged with drafting a constitution in 1975, the task had lower priority. It was not until the Third Party Congress that party Secretary General Kaysone stated that the LPRP should "urgently undertake the major task...of preparing a socialist constitution at an early date."

Laotian press reports subsequently revealed that a constitutional drafting committee was working informally under the chairmanship of Politburo member Sisomphone Lovansai, a specialist in party organization, with the help of East German advisers. On May 22, 1984, the SPA Standing Committee formalize the appointment of Sisomphone to head a 15-person drafting committee.

The political institutions had functioned without a written constitution for 15 years. International development agencies were reluctant to invest in Laos given the absence of a fixed, knowable law. Amnesty International, in a 1985 report on Laos, asserted that without a constitution or published penal and criminal codes, citizens were "effectively denied proper legal guarantees of their internationally recognized human rights." The party newspaper, Xieng Pasason (Voice of the People), commenting in June 1990 on the absence of a constitution and a general body of laws, acknowledged that "having no laws is... a source of injustice and violation, thus leading to a breakdown of social order and peace, the breeding of anarchy, and the lack of democracy."

According to some reports, progress in Laos had been blocked by differences within the Politburo over certain substantive clauses. The party leadership, accustomed to rule without question, may have assigned a low priority to producing a document that might eventually lead to challenging their authority.

After the new SPA was elected in March 1989, it formally appointed a 17-member constitutional drafting committee. The National Radio of Laos reported that the drafting committee was working "under the close supervision of the Political Bureau and the Secretariat of the Party Central Committee." 6 members of the drafting committee were members of the Central Committee; 2 of these members served on the SPA, which had 6 members on the drafting committee.

In April 1990, after securing approval of its document from the LPRP Politburo and the Secretariat, the SPA made public the draft constitution. With its publication, the party Central Committee issued Directive Number 21, on April 30, 1990, calling for discussion of the draft, first among party and government officials and then among the public. The discussions, while orchestrated by party cadres, did not always please party authorities. An LPRP spokesman released a memo complaining that "people in many major towns" had dwelled too much on what the constitution had to say about the organization of the state.

In June a member of the Central Committee cautioned against demonstrations to "demand a multiparty system" and warned that demonstrators would be arrested. Competing parties would not be tolerated, he asserted, adding that "our multi-ethnic Lao people have remained faithfully under the leadership of the LPRP." In a later pronouncement, he said that "the Party has proved to the people in the last 35 years that it is the only party that can take care of them" and he lectured that "too many parties invite division." A Central Committee directive, dated June 14, 1990, hinted at the quality of the public discussion, noting that "in many cases where people were convoked to a meeting, they were simply given question and answer sheets to study."

=== Calls for greater democracy ===
Inspired by the examples of Eastern Europe and the Soviet Union—where the monopoly of power by communist parties had crumbled—a group of some 40 government officials and intellectuals began criticizing the country's 1-party system in a series of letters and meetings in April 1990. Organized in the unofficial "Social Democratic Club," the group called for a multiparty system in Laos. 1 member of the group, an assistant to the minister of science and technology, submitted a letter of resignation to Prime Minister Kaysone in which he labeled Laos a "communist monarchy" and a "dynasty of the Politburo" declaring that the country should "change into a multi-party system in order to bring democracy, freedom and prosperity to the people."

Criticism of the draft document gathered strength in the succeeding months; Laotian students in Paris, Prague, and Warsaw joined in the call for free elections. Criticism broadened as a group of party cadres associated with nonparty bureaucrats—some educated in France and Canada—targeted veteran party leaders. These groups charged that the new policies of the old guard were fostering corruption and increased social and economic inequality. It was not until October 1990 that the government finally cracked down on these calls for democratic reforms, with the arrest of some protesters, including a former vice minister in the State Planning Commission and a director in the Ministry of Justice who were sentenced to prison terms in Houaphan.

Thus, while the constitution purports to guarantee freedom of speech and petition and its framers give lip service to the desirability of public discussion, the ruling party sent a message with these arrests that it will not tolerate challenges to its exclusive exercise of power. Some party leaders were more impressed by the political models of Vietnam and China than by the examples of Eastern Europe and the Soviet Union. While willing to experiment with economic liberalization, party leaders were deemed determined to retain political domination—if they could—through a Leninist-style party.

== Overview of the 1991 constitution ==
The 1991 constitution, which contains elements of an earlier revolutionary orthodoxy, is influenced by the economic and political liberalization within Laos, and by the changes in the socialist world and the international balance of forces. The constitution specifies the functions and powers of the organs of government and defines the rights and duties of citizens. Some chapters prescribing the structure of the state define the function and powers of the National Assembly (the renamed SPA), the president, the government, the local administration, and the judicial system. In foreign policy, the principles of peaceful coexistence are followed.

The constitution legally establishes a set of authorities that resemble the traditional differentiation among executive, legislative, and judicial branches of government. The delineation does not imitate any particular model and pays respect to the idea of a basic blueprint of responsibilities lodged in designated institutions. There is room for evolution of government authority, and there are boundaries.

Government outside Vientiane has developed an independence over the years, reflecting the exigencies of the Pathet Lao armed struggle and of economic self-reliance during the postwar socialist pitfalls. The constitution eliminated elected people's councils at the provincial and district level as "no more necessary," in an effort to fit the state apparatus to the needs of building and developing the regime under "the actual conditions of the country."

The will of the ruling party determines which road the administration follows in regard to local governance, and the constitution has left governors, mayors, and district and village chiefs free to "administer their regions and localities without any assistance from popularly elected bodies." The leading role of the party within the administration of the nation overall is illustrated by the fact that party Politburo members are found in state offices—the offices of the president of state, and prime minister, deputy prime ministers (2), chair of the National Assembly, minister of defense, and chair of the Party and State Inspection Board.

The first words of the Preamble refer to the "multi-ethnic Lao people," and use of this term is made throughout the text. The "key components" of the people are specified as workers, farmers, and intellectuals. The Preamble celebrates a revolution carried out "for more than 60 years" under the "correct leadership" of the ICP.

1 reference to the ruling party is made in Article 3, which states that the "rights of the multiethnic people to be the masters of the country are exercised and ensured through the functioning of the political system with the Lao People's Revolutionary Party as its leading nucleus."

Article 5 notes that the National Assembly and all other state organizations "function in accordance with the principle of democratic centralism." This stricture calls for open discussion within a unit and prescribes that the minority must accede to the will of the majority, and lower echelons must obey the decisions of higher ones.

Article 7 calls upon mass organizations, such as the Lao Front for National Construction, the Federation of Trade Unions, the People's Revolutionary Youth Union, and the Federation of Women's Unions, to "unite and mobilize the people." The Lao Front for National Construction, the successor to the LPF, served as the political front for the party during the revolutionary struggle. As of 1994, its mandate is to mobilize political support and raise political consciousness for the party's goals among organizations, ethnic groups, and social classes within society. Other mass organizations are assigned to pursue these goals among their target populations of workers, youths, and women.

The constitution proclaims that the state will respect the "principle of equality among ethnic tribes," which have the right to promote "their fine customs and culture." The state is committed to upgrading the "socio-economy of all ethnic groups."

Regarding religion, the state "respects and protects all lawful activities of the Buddhists and of other religious followers." Buddhist monks and other clergy are reminded that the state encourages them to "participate in the activities which are beneficial to the country".

The chapter on the socioeconomic system does not mention the establishment of socialism, a principal goal of earlier dogma. Instead, the objective of economic policy is to transform the "natural economy into a goods economy." Private property appears to be assured by the statement that the "state protects the right of ownership," including the right of transfer and inheritance. The state is authorized to undertake such tasks as managing the economy, providing education, expanding public health, and caring for war veterans, the aging, and the sick. The constitution admonishes that "all organizations and citizens must protect the environment."

A chapter on the rights and obligations of citizens sets forth a cluster of rights found in constitutions, including freedom of religion, speech, press, and assembly. Women and men are proclaimed equal, and all citizens can vote at age 18 and hold office at 21. In return, citizens are obliged to respect the laws, pay taxes, and defend the country, which includes military service. In commenting on this chapter in 1990, Amnesty International, concerned about past human rights abuses, criticized the document for what was not included. Amnesty International noted the absence of provisions for protecting the right to life, abolishing the death penalty, guaranteeing the inalienability of fundamental rights, prohibiting torture, safeguarding against arbitrary arrest and detention, protecting people deprived of their liberty, and providing for a fair trial. No safeguards exist to protect the rights to freedom of opinion and expression, peaceful assembly and association, and independence of the judiciary.

The constitution specify that the leaders at each echelon must ensure the implementation of the constitution and the law and must carry out decisions taken by a higher level.
