= 1997 Laotian parliamentary election =

- 21 December 1997
- All 99 seats in the National Assembly
Party	Leader	Seats	+/–
LPRP	Khamtai Siphandone	98	+13
Independents	–	1	+1
This lists parties that won seats. See the complete results below.
President before	President after
Nouhak Phoumsavanh; LPRP	Khamtai Siphandone; LPRP

Parliamentary elections were held in Laos on 21 December 1997. A total of 159 candidates contested the 99 seats, all but four of which were Lao People's Revolutionary Party members. All candidates were pre-screened by the LPRP. The LPRP won 98 seats, with an independent winning the remaining seat. Voter turnout was reported to be 99.4%.

== Results ==
Party	Votes	%	Seats	+/–
Lao People's Revolutionary Party			98	+13
Independents			1	+1
Total			99	+14
Total votes	2,284,632	–		
Registered voters/turnout	2,299,128	99.37		
Source: Nohlen et al.
