= 2016 Laotian parliamentary election =

- 20 March 2016
- All 149 seats in the National Assembly; 75 seats needed for a majority
Party	Leader	Seats	+/–
LPRP	Bounnhang Vorachit	144	+16
Independents	–	5	+1
This lists parties that won seats. See the complete results below.
President before	President after
Choummaly Sayasone; LPRP	Bounnhang Vorachit; LPRP

Parliamentary elections were held in Laos on 20 March 2016. Voters were presented with a single list from the Lao Front for National Construction, dominated by the Communist Lao People's Revolutionary Party (LRPP). The LPRP won 144 of the 149 seats, with pro-government independents winning the remaining five.

== Electoral system ==
The 149 members of the National Assembly were elected from 18 multi-member constituencies with between three and fourteen seats using the first-past-the-post system. Candidates had to gain the support of a local authority or a mass organisation to run for office, and election committees approve candidacies. Due to a rise in the country's population, the number of seats was increased from 132 in the 2011 elections.

== Campaign ==
A total of 149 seats were contested by 211 candidates, including 50 women and 48 incumbent MPs. Much of the election campaign was focused on economic development.

== Results ==
Of the 149 elected members, 73% were first-time MPs.

Party	Votes	%	Seats	+/–
Lao People's Revolutionary Party			144	+16
Independents			5	+1
Total			149	+17
Total votes	3,657,026	–		
Registered voters/turnout	3,733,932	97.94		
Source: IPU

== Aftermath ==
Following the elections, the National Assembly convened on 20 April to elect Bounnhang Vorachith as president (replacing Choummaly Sayasone) and Thongloun Sisoulith as Prime Minister, replacing Thongsing Thammavong.
