= 2011 Laotian parliamentary election =

- 30 April 2011
- All 132 seats in the National Assembly
Party	Leader	Seats	+/–
LPRP	Choummaly Sayasone	128	+15
Independents	–	4	+2
This lists parties that won seats. See the complete results below.
President before	President after
Choummaly Sayasone; LPRP	Choummaly Sayasone; LPRP

Parliamentary elections were held in Laos on 30 April 2011. The ruling Lao People's Revolutionary Party (LPRP) won 128 of the 132 seats in the National Assembly.

== Campaign ==
A total of 190 candidates contested the 132 seats, of which 185 were members of the LPRP.

== Results ==
Party	Votes	%	Seats	+/–
Lao People's Revolutionary Party			128	+15
Independents			4	+2
Total			132	+17
Total votes	3,230,000	–		
Registered voters/turnout	3,240,000	99.69		
Source: IPU
