= 2021 Laotian parliamentary election =

- 21 February 2021
- All 164 seats in the National Assembly; 83 seats needed for a majority
| Party | Leader | Seats | +/– |
|---|---|---|---|
| LPRP | Thongloun Sisoulith | 158 | +14 |
| Independents | – | 6 | +1 |
This lists parties that won seats. See the complete results below.
| President of Laos before | President of Laos after |
|---|---|
| Bounnhang Vorachit; LPRP | Thongloun Sisoulith; LPRP |

Parliamentary elections were held in Laos on 21 February 2021 to elect the members of the ninth National Assembly. Provincial elections took place simultaneously.

== Background ==
The Lao People's Revolutionary Party was the sole party that could field candidates. In the 2016 parliamentary elections the party won 144 of 149 total seats, with the rest won by independent candidates.

== Electoral system ==
The 164 members of the National Assembly were elected for five-year terms from 18 multi-member constituencies with between five and nineteen seats using the multiple non-transferable vote system. Candidates needed to gain the support of a local authority or a mass organisation to run for office. In each constituency, voters voted for a list with as many candidates as there were seats to be filled, and the list with the most votes winning all of its seats. The seat distribution dependent on population; each province had a minimum of five seats, with one additional seat for every 50,000 inhabitants starting at 250,000 inhabitants, up to a maximum of 19 seats.

In excess of 7,200 polling stations were used, with overseas voting possible in forty other countries.

== Campaign ==
A total of 224 candidates contested the National Assembly elections, with 788 candidates competing for the 492 Provincial People's Councils seats. Younger, as well as middle-aged candidates, made up a larger percentage of the candidates than usual, as a result of a push from the Laotian government for younger people to get involved in politics.

== Results ==
On 1 March the Vientiane Times reported that vote counts had not been finalized yet, but would likely be within the week. The new National Assembly met for the first time on 22 March.

| Party | Votes | % | Seats | +/– |
|---|---|---|---|---|
| Lao People's Revolutionary Party | | | 158 | +14 |
| Independents | | | 6 | +1 |
| Total | | | 164 | +15 |
| Total votes | 3,973,017 | – | | |
| Registered voters/turnout | 4,053,151 | 98.02 | | |
Source: IPU, Vientiane Times
