= Ministry of Agriculture and Forestry (Laos) =

Government ministry of Laos

- ກະຊວງ ກະສິກຳ ແລະ ປ່າໄມ້
- Ministry of Agriculture and Forestry of Laos

Ministry overview
- Jurisdiction: Lao People’s Democratic Republic
- Headquarters: Vientiane, Laos; 17°58′N 102°36′E
- Minister responsible: H.E. Sitaheng Rasphone, Minister of Agriculture and Forestry
- Website: www.maf.gov.la

The Ministry of Agriculture and Forestry of Laos (ກະຊວງ ກະສິກຳ ແລະ ປ່າໄມ້ in Lao language) is a ministry of the government of the Lao People's Democratic Republic (Lao PDR). Its acronym is LMAF. The minister of Agriculture and Forestry is H.E. Sitaheng Rasphone. The ministry plays a role in shaping the Laos agricultural policies, managing its natural resources, and supporting rural development to enhance food security and reduce poverty. LMAF's initiatives promote sustainable environmental practices and economic growth, reflecting its commitment to national and international goals for sustainable development.

Since its establishment, LMAF efforts have focused on the utilization and preservation of the country's agricultural and forestry resources. The ministry's policies and projects are guided by a series of development plans, starting from the Three-Year Economic-Social Development Plan (1978-1980) to the Five-Year Plans, which have spanned several phases and covered periods such as 1981-1985 and 2001-2005. These plans organize financial support for agricultural progress, address production capacities, and seek to generate job opportunities within these industries.

== History ==
The Ministry of Agriculture and Forestry of Laos (LMAF) has focused on agricultural and forestry sectors since the establishment of the Lao People's Democratic Republic. Post-1975 revolution, LMAF initially focused on intensifying agricultural production using chemical inputs and mechanization to meet ambitious production targets. However, these strategies faced challenges due to Laos's bio-geophysical conditions and the competitive agricultural landscape in Southeast Asia.

In response to these challenges, LMAF shifted its focus towards sustainable agricultural practices. This pivot was supported by research from the Stockholm Environment Institute and collaborations with international bodies like the FAO, culminating in the adoption of a Green Sustainable Agriculture (GSA) framework. This framework aims to enhance productivity, resilience, and sustainability in the agricultural sector, aligning with national and provincial policy development.

Today, the Ministry continues to focus on sustainable practices as part of its broader national development goals. It works with international agencies to align its agricultural policies with global sustainability goals, aiming to improve the well-being and prosperity of its population through better management of natural resources and more resilient agricultural practices.

== Current initiatives and projects ==
Sustainable Development and Food Security

- Pathways to Sustainable Food Systems:
  - In November 2021, the ministry launched 'Pathways to Sustainable Food Systems in Lao PDR,' a report produced from conversations supported by the (Food and Agriculture Organization of the United Nations) FAO, outlining strategies for sustainable food systems in Laos.
  - Recent projects supported by World Vision International focus on adapting agricultural practices to mitigate the effects of climate variability and improve resilience.
- Green Growth Economic Corridor:
  - Initiated with the FAO's support, this project aims to increase sustainable agricultural investments and rural developments.
- Lao Landscapes and Livelihoods Project:
  - Supported by the World Bank, this project aims at biodiversity protection, reducing carbon emissions, and improving livelihoods through nature-based tourism.

== Structure ==
The organizational structure of the Ministry of Agriculture and Forestry (MAF) of Laos manages various aspects of agriculture and forestry through several departments and divisions:

- Permanent Secretary Office (PSO)
- Department of Livestock and Fisheries (DOLF)
- Department of Agriculture (DOA)
- Department of Forestry (DOF)
- Department of Inspection (DOIN)
- Department of Irrigation (DOI)
- Department of Organization and Personnel (DOAP)
- Department of Planning and Finance (DoPF)
- Department of Policy and Legal Affairs (DoPLA)
- Department of Forestry (DOF)
- Department of Forest Inspection (DOFI)
- Department of Agricultural Extension and Cooperatives (DAEC)
- Department of Agricultural Land Management (DALaM)
- Council for Science and Technology (CST)
- National Agricultural and Forestry Research Institute (NAFRI)
