= 2002 Laotian parliamentary election =

- 24 February 2002
- All 109 seats in the National Assembly
Party	Leader	Seats	+/–
LPRP	Khamtai Siphandone	109	+11
This lists parties that won seats. See the complete results below.
President before	President after
Khamtai Siphandone; LPRP	Khamtai Siphandone; LPRP

Parliamentary elections were held in Laos on 24 February 2002. The ruling Lao People's Revolutionary Party (LPRP) won all 109 seats in the National Assembly.

== Campaign ==
A total of 166 candidates contested the 109 seats, of which 165 were members of the LPRP.

== Electoral system ==
The election used plurality block voting. Each province formed a constituency, as did the Special Zone of Xaisomboun, electing between three and sixteen representatives.

== Results ==
Graph of the party split among 109 seats.
Party	Votes	%	Seats	+/–
Lao People's Revolutionary Party			109	+11
Independents			0	–1
Total			109	+10
Valid votes	2,543,164	99.99		
Invalid/blank votes	239	0.01		
Total votes	2,543,403	100.00		
Registered voters/turnout	2,545,838	99.90		
Source: IPU
