= Lao People's Revolutionary Party =

Sole ruling party of Laos

Lao People's Revolutionary Party ພັກປະຊາຊົນປະຕິວັດລາວ
- Abbreviation: LPRP
- General Secretary: Thongloun Sisoulith
- Standing Member: Vilay Lakhamfong
- Founder: Kaysone Phomvihane
- Founded: 22 March 1955 (71 years, 209 days)
- Split from: Indochinese Communist Party
- Headquarters: Vientiane
- Newspaper: Pasaxon
- Youth wing: 2nd December Young Pioneer Brigade; Lao People's Revolutionary Youth Union
- Armed wing: Lao People's Armed Forces
- Membership (2026): ▲421,865
- Ideology: Communism; Marxism–Leninism; Kaysone Phomvihane Thought; Laotian nationalism
- National affiliation: Lao Front for National Development
- International affiliation: IMCWP; For the Freedom of Nations!
- National Assembly: 169 / 175 (97%)

Party flag

Website
- ccop.gov.la

The Lao People's Revolutionary Party (LPRP) (Note: Lao: ພັກປະຊາຊົນປະຕິວັດລາວ, Phak Pasaxon Pativat Lao; French: Parti révolutionnaire populaire lao) is the founding and sole ruling party of the Lao People's Democratic Republic. The party's monopoly on state power is guaranteed by Article 3 of the Constitution of Laos, and it maintains a unitary state with centralised control over the economy and military.

The LPRP was established on 22 March 1955 by former members of the Indochinese Communist Party. It led the insurgency against the Royal Lao Government and supported North Vietnamese forces in the Vietnam War. The insurgency culminated with the LPRP securing power in Laos in 1975. During its first years in power, the party strengthened party-state control over society and attempted to establish a planned economy based on the Soviet model. In the 1980s, influenced by market reforms in China and Vietnam, the LPRP initiated economic reforms that privatised state companies and legalised private property.

Democratic centralism, a concept conceived by Russian Marxist Vladimir Lenin, is the organisational form of the LPRP. The highest institution of the party is the National Congress, which elects the Central Committee. In between party congresses, the Central Committee is the highest decision-making organ regarding party affairs. After a party congress, the Central Committee elects the Politburo and Secretariat, as well as the General Secretary, the highest party officer. In between sessions of the Central Committee, the Politburo is the highest decision-making body. As of 2026, the 12th Politburo comprises 13 members. The current party leader is Thongloun Sisoulith, who holds the titles of General Secretary of the Central Committee, Chairman of the Defence and Public Security Commission, and Prime Minister of Laos, who is the head of government.

The LPRP is committed to communism and participates in the International Meeting of Communist and Workers' Parties, an annual international forum of communist parties. According to the party statute, the party adheres to Marxism–Leninism and Kaysone Phomvihane Thought. Upon taking power in 1975, the party sought to immediately abolish the capitalist mode of production through a people's democratic revolution and establishing a people's democratic state, which would pave the way to a socialist society. By the 1990s, the direction of the party had changed, and the party leadership believed that Laos was too underdeveloped to immediately initiate the construction of socialism. The party thus adopted a policy in which the people's democratic state used state capitalism as a tool to construct the material base of socialism.

== History ==
=== Origins and the National Democratic Revolution (1945–1975) ===
The forerunner of the LPRP was the Indochinese Communist Party (ICP), which was established by the revolutionary Vietnamese leader Ho Chi Minh in February 1930 in order to organize a coordinated, grassroots fighting force against French domination of Indochina, in cooperation with and with the support of the Communist International (Comintern). The ICP was tasked "to wipe out feudal remnants, to distribute land to the tillers, to overthrow imperialism and to make Indochina completely independent."

Dominated by the Vietnamese, the ICP was originally named the "Communist Party of Vietnam", which was changed due to the Comintern's displeasure with the organisation's tone of Vietnamese nationalism and the Comintern's belief that the laborers of Vietnam, Cambodia, and Laos had more in common than had differences.

Despite its claims to be an Indochinese party, the ICP remained a completely Vietnamese-dominated one until after its formal dissolution on 11 November 1945, on which date the Indochinese National Democratic Revolution was proclaimed. Throughout its previous existence, the ICP had had no Cambodian or Laotian members. In 1946, a concerted drive was begun by the underground ICP to recruit Laotian communist cadres. Half-Vietnamese Kaysone Phomvihan, the LPRP General Secretary from 1955 until his death 1992, was recruited sometime in 1946–47 while a student at the University of Hanoi. However, the lack of Lao representation among the underground ICP would remain a problem; and by February 1951 only 81 of the 2,091 members were Lao.

In February 1951, the underground ICP convened its 2nd National Congress and changed its name to the Workers' Party of Vietnam (WPV). According to political scientist Joseph J. Zasloff, "Eliminating the 'Indochinese' label of the Communist party seemed designed to appeal to nationalist sentiments in Vietnam, Laos, and Cambodia. To demonstrate close links among the three peoples, the Vietnamese organisers of this congress invited several Cambodian and Lao leaders to attend." In the immediate aftermath of the 2nd National Congress, a Viet-Lao-Khmer alliance was announced which declared a shared commitment to fighting against French colonialism and American imperialism in the region.

By 1952, the WPV established the Committee for the Organization of the Party, which was composed of five members: Kaysone Phomvihan (as Secretary), Nouhak Phoumsavan, Sisavath Keobounphan, Boun Phommahaxai, and Khamsen.

In 1953, the WPV initiated a purification of the Lao membership that expelled all but seventeen full members and an unknown number of candidate members. In the following two years, several communist cells were established throughout Laos; and on 22 March 1955, the founding congress met and established the Lao People's Party (LPP). However, not everything went according to plan and the LPP was nearly annihilated by 1959, by severe government repression. The North Vietnamese reacted by increasing their support to the LPP and its military, the Pathet Lao; and by the early 1960s the party controlled nearly half the country. Despite being the leading force behind the insurgency from 1955 to 1975, the party kept its existence secret, preferring to direct their activities through mass fronts. Few Laotians knew about the party's existence or the name of its leaders during this period. This did not preclude organisational activities. In February 1972, the 2nd National Congress was convened and changed the party's name to the Lao People's Revolutionary Party (LPRP).

On 21 February 1973, after years of warfare, a peace agreement was brokered with the Royal Lao Government. A Provisional Government of National Unity (PGNU) was established; it was composed of leftist factions and led by royalist Souvanna Phouma. Similar to the unravelling of South Vietnam from 1974 to 1975, the Royal Lao Government faced several rebellions.

From December 1974 to January 1975 royal troops in the Houei Sai district of Houa Khong Province, and in Khammouane Province, began an uprising against the government. Reacting to unfolding events, the party, through the Pathet Lao, seized control of the roads leading to Vientiane, effectively cutting off supplies to the capital. During April and May, a city-wide anti-government protest took place in Vientiane, which led to the resignation of five cabinet members. In a last-ditch attempt to save the monarchy, the government announced new elections for 1976. On 26 November, LPRP representatives managed to get the monarchy officially to "voluntarily" renounce its royal wealth and abdicate. The party thus convened a National Congress of People's Representatives for 1–2 December 1975. The congress dissolved the Kingdom of Laos, established the Lao People's Democratic Republic, and announced the end of the 30-year-old National Democratic Revolution.

=== Ruling party of Laos (1975–present) ===
The collapse of the royal government and the ensuing establishment of the new socialist government produced an exodus, and by 1980 ten percent of the population had left the country. In its first years of power, the party retained its secretive ways. For instance, Kaysone Phomvihan, the LPRP General Secretary, was unknown to most citizens at the time.

The leading public voices of the communist movement before 1975, such as Lao Patriotic Front chairman Souphanouvong, were swept aside after the political transition of 1975. The new government swiftly closed down independent news organisations. Such organisations that were not dissolved were forced to seek membership in the Lao Front for National Construction (LFNC), a mass organisation controlled by the LPRP. To spread the new government's word, the LPRP and the LFNC organised meetings nationwide to educate the people about the party line and spread Marxist–Leninist doctrine. The end goal of this process was the creation of the new socialist man.

In 1978, the LPRP continued its socialist transformation by collectivising agriculture. According to journalist and historian Martin Stuart-Fox, the LPRP believed that "productivity of agriculture could only be raised through economies of scale (by analogy with an industrial model), and this could only be achieved by collective ownership of the means of production.

Cooperatives, they argued, could maximise the use of modern inputs into agriculture. The twin-goal of the collectivisation process was

(1) abolishing private ownership in the countryside and

(2) strengthening political control in areas formerly controlled by the Royal Lao Government.

Collectivisation proved hard to implement, and several areas actively resisted the policy. Consequently, the LPRP Central Committee gave up on collectivisation in 1981. It argued that "Efforts to mobilise farmers to join agricultural cooperatives or set up new ones during the current production season should be immediately and strictly suspended while the people are engaging in production in order rapidly and effectively to increase production." Instead of emphasising collectivisation, the LPRP began focusing on employing modern agricultural equipment to improve economic efficiency.

By 1988, Kaysone Phomvihan conceded that collectivisation had been a failure: "Our previous cooperative policy was in the old style practised by other socialist countries. After some investigations into the actual situation in Laos, we decided to change direction and start from the family." Two years later in 1990, virtually all agricultural cooperatives had ceased to exist.

In 1986, at the 4th National Congress, the LPRP began dismantling its system of economic planning, which was inspired by the Soviet model. Kaysone Phomvihan, in his Political Report of the 3rd Central Committee, noted that "Our main shortcomings lie in subjectivism and haste, in our inclination to abolish the non-socialist economic sectors promptly ... We are bent on egalitarianism. Consequently, we did not encourage good workers with high labour productivity. There was no relationship between responsibility, rights, obligations, and interests."

Under the banner term socialist economic accounting the LPRP began severing state enterprises from the state budget, forcing them to survive in the free market. In 1988, in light of the crisis taking place in the Eastern Bloc and the Soviet Union, further reforms were introduced. A code of laws friendly to foreign investment was adopted, and joint ventures were encouraged. The most important, unspoken reason for these changes was a drastic decline in foreign assistance on which Laos totally depended, of which 70 per cent originated from the Socialist Bloc. In 1988, total foreign aid from the Eastern Bloc stood at US$52 million; by 1989 it was US$1 million, and none was received in 1990.

The collapse of communism in Europe greatly impacted Laos. Some students began criticising the LPRP's monopoly on state power and began calling for a multi-party system. They were supported by the Social Democrat Club, a group of forty Lao intellectuals. Inspired by events, LPRP official Thongsouk Saisangkhi, the Vice-Minister for Science and Technology, submitted an open resignation letter and accused the LPRP of establishing a "communist monarchy" and a "dynasty of the Politburo", a reference to the growing influence of the children of the leaders.

The LPRP did not budge, and Thongsouk Saisangkhi together with Vice-Minister of Economics and Planning Latsami Khamphoui and Ministry of Justice official Pheng Sakchittaphong were imprisoned in October 1990, and sentenced to fourteen years in prison in November 1992. Later that same year a new constitution was adopted, which stated that Laos was a people's democratic state under the leadership of the LPRP. Instead of appeasing the critics, Khamtai Siphandon, a Politburo member at the time, stated unequivocally that "The Party is also the sole Party whom the people trust. All slanders and attempts designed to undermine the leadership role of the Party are regarded as contradictory to historical reality and the national interest."

The governance of the party and state has stabilised since the 1980s. Management consultant Clay Wescott notes that the party "has shown itself to be remarkably resilient. Transitions of power have tended to be smooth, the new generation of leaders has proven more open to reform, and the Politburo now has some ethnic diversity." After serving fourteen years as LPRP General Secretary, Khamtai Siphandon left office in 2006, and was succeeded by Choummaly Sayasone who served ten years in office. In 2016, Sayasone was succeeded by Bounnhang Vorachith, who served until 2021 and was succeeded by the current LPRP General Secretary, Thongloun Sisoulith.

== Governance ==
=== Democratic centralism ===
The party's centralised and hierarchical organisational structure is based on democratic centralism, which was conceived by Vladimir Lenin. This structure entails that lower party organs obey the decisions of the higher ones, such as the LPRP Central Committee. It also entails a ban on internal party factions. In the end, every decision-making organ has to be guided by the principle of collective leadership, a process that emphasises collegial decision-making, in contrast to one-person dominance. LPRP General Secretary Kaysone Phomvihane, in a speech to the 5th National Congress in 1991, stated "that our Party's democracy is a centralised one. Therefore, we must strictly implement the principle according to which the minority must yield to the majority; the lower leading organisation execute the upper leading organisation's orders. The whole Party follows the Central Committee."

=== Favoritism ===
Nepotism, meaning favouritism that is granted to relatives, and patronage, the support a powerful individual bestows on another, is a mainstay of LPRP politics. It is estimated that 25 per cent of the 10th Central Committee members are connected through birth or marriage to one of the founding revolutionary families. The most prominent example is Xaysomphone Phomvihane, the eldest son of Kaysone Phomvihane, who was elected to the 10th and 11th politburos. Kaysone Phomvihane's wife, Thongvin Phomvihane, served as General Secretary of the Lao People's Revolutionary Youth Union from 1988 to 1993. Khampheng Saysompheng, the son-in-law of former LPRP General Secretary Khamtai Siphandon, was elected to the 9th Central Committee, was appointed Minister of Labour and Social Welfare in 2015, and was elected to the 10th Central Committee in 2016. In 2015, Viengthong Siphandone, the wife of Khampheng Saysompheng and daughter of Khamtai Siphandon, was appointed chairwoman of the State Audit Organisation, and in 2016 was elected to the 10th Central Committee. Viengthong Siphandone's brother Sonexay Siphandone was transferred from his governorship of Champasak Province and appointed Minister of the Office of Government in 2015, elected to the 10th Politburo in 2016, and reelected to the 11th in 2021.

This tendency continued under the stewardship of LPRP General Secretary Choummaly Sayasone, whose brother-in-law Khammeung Phongthady was elected to the 9th Central Committee and was reassigned from his governorship of Vientiane province to be cabinet chief of the Office of the Presidency. Khammeung's reassignment opened the door for Choummaly Sayasone to appoint his eldest son, Vidong Sayasone, to become Secretary of the Vientiane LPRP Provincial Committee. In addition to his secretaryship, Vidong Sayasone was later elected to the 9th Central Committee. Choummaly Sayasone's two other sons, Phoxay Sayasone and Phokham Sayasone, were also appointed to leading party offices, with Phoxay Sayasone elected as a substitute member of the 10th Central Committee. The current LPRP General Secretary Thongloun Sisoulith married the adopted daughter of former acting president Phoumi Vongvichit.

Writing in Politics and Reform in Laos, Stuart-Fox remarks that "senior Party members [after the revolution] soon began to dispense patronage in the traditional Lao way, rewarding extended family members and loyal retainers with favours and jobs, for which they were often poorly qualified, to build a political support base ... Ironically, this process of political-economic elite formation was powerfully assisted by the introduction of the economic reforms of the 1980s". In this sense, Lao political culture has changed little with the communist seizure of power. This inherent tendency in the LPRP could explain the rent-seeking behaviour of some of its members and its limited organisational capacity. The LPRP differs in this way from its counterparts in China and Vietnam. Stuart-Fox contends that Laos's lack of a state bureaucratic tradition throughout its history has forced Laotians to rely on their extended families and friends. Lao specialists Keith Barney and Simon Creak disagree with Stuart-Fox's assertion and argue "[that] the relatively institutionalised character of Lao authoritarianism, which has placed the top leadership positions less as powers in themselves, and more under the broad discipline of the LPRP. To express this another way, the LPRP provides a disciplining mechanism for the patron-client relations that continue to function throughout society, which in turn depends on party connections."

=== Monopoly on state power ===
The LPRP has a monopoly on state power in the country.

The LPRP has a legal monopoly on state power. In turn, the state maintains a centralised and unitary state power based on democratic centralism. Having the status as "the most ethnically diverse" country of Southeast Asia, the Laotian unitary state system is legitimised by socialist integrationism. This school of thought "[regards] social classes as the key component of social thought and practice, and [regards] the promotion of distributive justice as the appropriate public priority." In other words, differences in class, income, and status are more important than ethnic differences. In the words of Stuart-Fox, the party controls this unitary state through "the government, the bureaucracy, mass organisations and the military. In all four, it is virtually de rigueur for leading figures to be Party members. They would not be in those positions unless they were members of the Party. Party cells operate in all institutions, and there is active recruitment of promising younger personnel into the Party; membership is by invitation only." Economist Bounlonh J.Soukamneuth concurs with Stuart-Fox's assessment and writes that the "Party monopolises political ambition and regulates public life. Party operatives penetrate all institutions of government and many areas of society. All party-state organisations (from the government bureaucracy, the mass organisation, to the military) implement party directives and administer its monopoly on power."

The party has established cells in every state institution. The intention is to ensure "the party's all-around absolute and direct leadership over all links, from the mapping out of lines and policies to the organisation of execution and control." The fruit of this labour is, according to former LPRP General Secretary Khamtai Siphandon, that "the party leadership commands historical events." This means that state institutions, such as the Lao Government, implements party directives. Each government ministry appoints a vice minister responsible for implementing party directives.

The preamble of the Lao constitution states that "the correct leadership of the former Indochinese Communist Party and the present Lao People's Revolutionary Party" explains the party's role in society. Still, unlike the statutory roles of the Chinese Communist Party and the Communist Party of Vietnam, the Laotian constitution does not firmly establish the LPRP's leadership over state and society. Rather, Article 3 of the constitution states that "The rights of the multi-ethnic people to be masters of the country are exercised and ensured through the functioning of the political system with the Lao People's Revolutionary Party as its leading nucleus." According to legal scholar Bui Ngoc Son, Article 3 "is not merely expressive of the Marxist orthodoxy of party vanguard but also responsive to the local concern of integration of ethnic diversity. This is an ambiguous constitutional commitment as a response to ethnic plurality." Further, the constitution states in Article 10 that the party is subject to the law: "[the Party] must function within the bounds of the Constitution and the laws."

The Lao People's Armed Forces (LPAF), the military, is tasked by the constitution to defend the gains of the revolution and the achievements of LPRP rule. The constitution says little about civil-military relations and political control over it. The LPRP's own statute clearly states that its political leadership over the military (and other security forces) emanates from the LPRP Central Committee's Defence and Public Security Commission (DPSC) and that the DPSC maintains direct, united, and full control of the LPAF.

=== Election process ===
Election	Term	Seats	+/–
1989	2nd	65 / 79	▲65
1992	3rd	85 / 85	▲20
1997	4th	98 / 99	▲13
2002	5th	109 / 109	▲11
2006	6th	113 / 115	▲4
2011	7th	128 / 132	▲15
2016	8th	144 / 149	▲16
2021	9th	158 / 164	▲14
2026	10th	169 / 175	▲11

Elections to the unicameral National Assembly are held every five years. The assembly is defined by the constitution as "the representative of the rights, powers and interests of the multi-ethnic people." The body is elected by universal suffrage and secret ballot. The election laws state that to stand for election a candidate must be approved by the Lao Front for National Construction, which decides if the candidate passes criteria outlined in the law. Some of the criteria are quite general, such as a candidate having to "be patriotic, be devoted to the people's democracy, be loyal to the New Economic Mechanism of the Party, be true to the nation, always serve the interests of the people, and have a strong, clear and absolute attitude towards friends and enemies". Other criteria such as a candidate's having to "have a sufficient level of knowledge of the Party's policies and strategic programs, and of State laws and regulations, and have the capacity to undertake propaganda and motivate people to be aware of and to participate in the implementation of Party policies and State laws" makes it easier for LPRP members to be approved as candidates.

Most candidates, therefore, end up being members of the LPRP. There are usually more candidates than seats; at the 2016 election, 210 candidates were competing for the 149 seats in the 7th National Assembly. While elected representatives have used the National Assembly to question the government on a wide range of policies, such as corruption, the assembly has never punished the government in any sense. Stuart-Fox opines that it is unlikely that [LPRP members] will jeopardise their chances for promotion within the party by questioning their own leaders too closely." Anthropologist Holly High disagrees, and notes that "While in the past the role of the NA [National Assembly] was often dismissed as a mere symbolic nod towards representational politics and a rubber stamp for party directives, perceptions have changed in recent years with the NA now thought of as a key avenue for popular recourse." She notes that National Assembly chairwoman Pany Yathotou has sought to simplify the process whereby constituents can contact and inform their elected representatives. In the same spirit the National Assembly has established a hotline by which any Lao citizen can contact their representative via free-call, letter, or e-mail. At the mid-year plenary session of the National Assembly in 2012, representatives received 280 calls over 17 days. The majority of complaints were about the handling of land issues and compensation.

=== Vanguardism ===
The LPRP is a Marxist–Leninist party deeply influenced by the Vietnamese and Soviet communists' examples. The party sees itself as "the sole faithful representative of the interests of the working classes, the working people of all Lao nationalities and the entire Lao people." Like the Communist Party of Vietnam, the LPRP nurtures the idea that socialism can only succeed if a disciplined and genuinely revolutionary party is in place. Thus, the party considers itself the directing force of the socialist revolution and socialist construction, and sees as its responsibility to propagate Marxist values. That is, it considers itself to be a vanguard party. Thus, the LPRP contends that there is no reason, ideologically, for other parties to exist. In light of this, Kayasone Phomvihane once told The New York Times that "The Laotian people have faith in and agree with the People's Revolutionary Party's leadership since the party belongs to the people, originates from the people and serves the people. Our Laotian party does not yet see any need for establishing other political parties."

LPRP study material states that earlier revolutionary heroes against French oppression—such as Ong Keo, Kommadam, Chao-Fa Patchai, and Pho Kadout—"were defeated because there was no Party to lead the struggle." Party cadres are therefore told that they are the "vanguard of the revolution" since they've acquired knowledge of the contradictions in Lao society and, during the Laotian Civil War, understood that the only way to establish a free Laos was through armed struggle. A good cadre is therefore defined by the LPRP as someone "who is loyal to the nation and willing to serve the people, obeys his leaders without question, keeps good discipline, respects the system, improves himself through study ... [and] be resolute, brave, and undiscouraged in the face of difficulties."

== Organisation ==
=== Central organisation ===
The National Congress is the party's highest body, and convenes every five years. According to the party statute, the Central Committee convenes the national congress. The party statute gives the Congress the following responsibilities:

1. Hearing the Political Report of the outgoing Central Committee
2. Examining the Political Report of the outgoing Central Committee
3. Adopting a Five-Year Plan of Socio-Economic Development
4. Electing a Central Committee
5. Discussing and enacting party policies
6. Revising the party statute

In between LPRP convocations of the National Congress, the Central Committee is the highest decision-making institution. The Central Committee elects the membership of several bodies to carry out its work. The 1st Plenary Session of a newly elected Central Committee elects the party's General Secretary, Defence and Public Security Commission (DPSC), the Secretariat, the Politburo, and the Inspection Commission. The Politburo exercises the functions and powers of the Central Committee when the latter is not in session. The DPSC is the highest decision-making institution regarding military and security affairs within the party, and controls the operations of the Lao People's Armed Forces. The LPRP General Secretary is by right of office the DPSC chairman. Meanwhile, the Secretariat is the top implementation body and is headed by the LPRP General Secretary as the 1st-ranking member and the Inspection Commission chairman as the 2nd-ranking member, with the 3rd-ranking member serving as the Standing Member. LPRP secretaries normally head or work in Central Committee commissions, the Pasaxon and Alun Mai publications, and so on. The Inspection Commission resolves disciplinary issues involving party members. Subjects for investigation range from graft to anti-party and counter-revolutionary activities, and generally encompass all party rules violations.

=== Lower-level organisation ===
The Lao People's Revolutionary Youth Union (LPRYU) is the LPRP's youth league. It was established in 1983, and is modelled organisationally on the LPRP; it has its own General Secretary, Politburo, Secretariat, and Central Committee. It convenes a national congress, its highest decision-making body, every five years; and it publishes its own newspaper, the Num Lao.

== Ideology ==
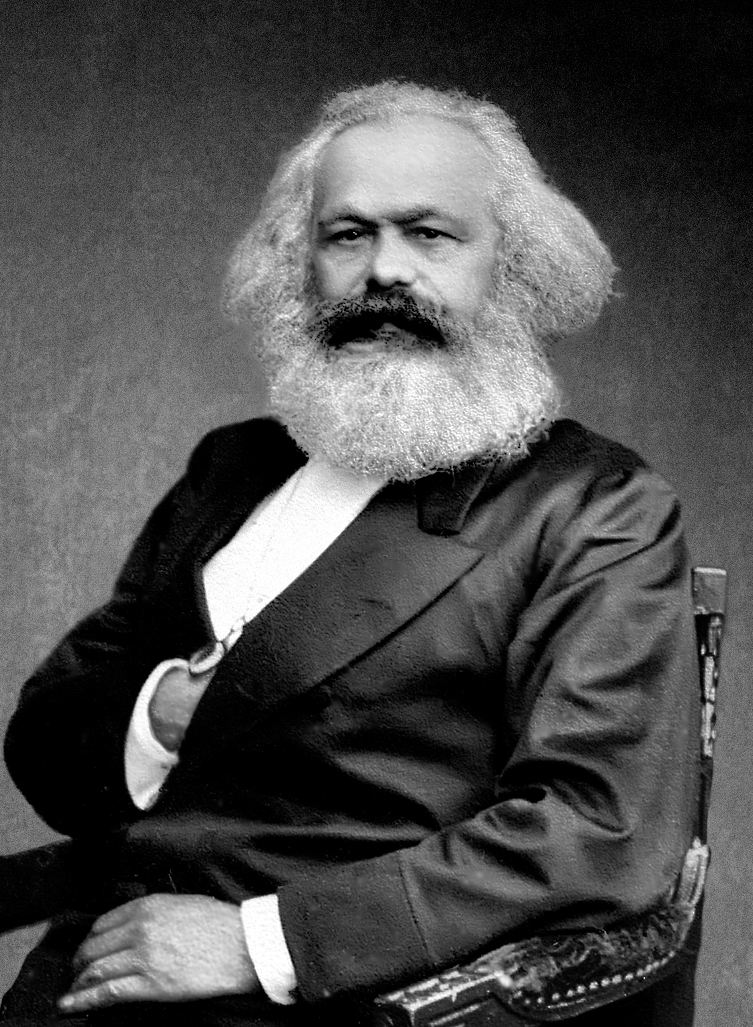
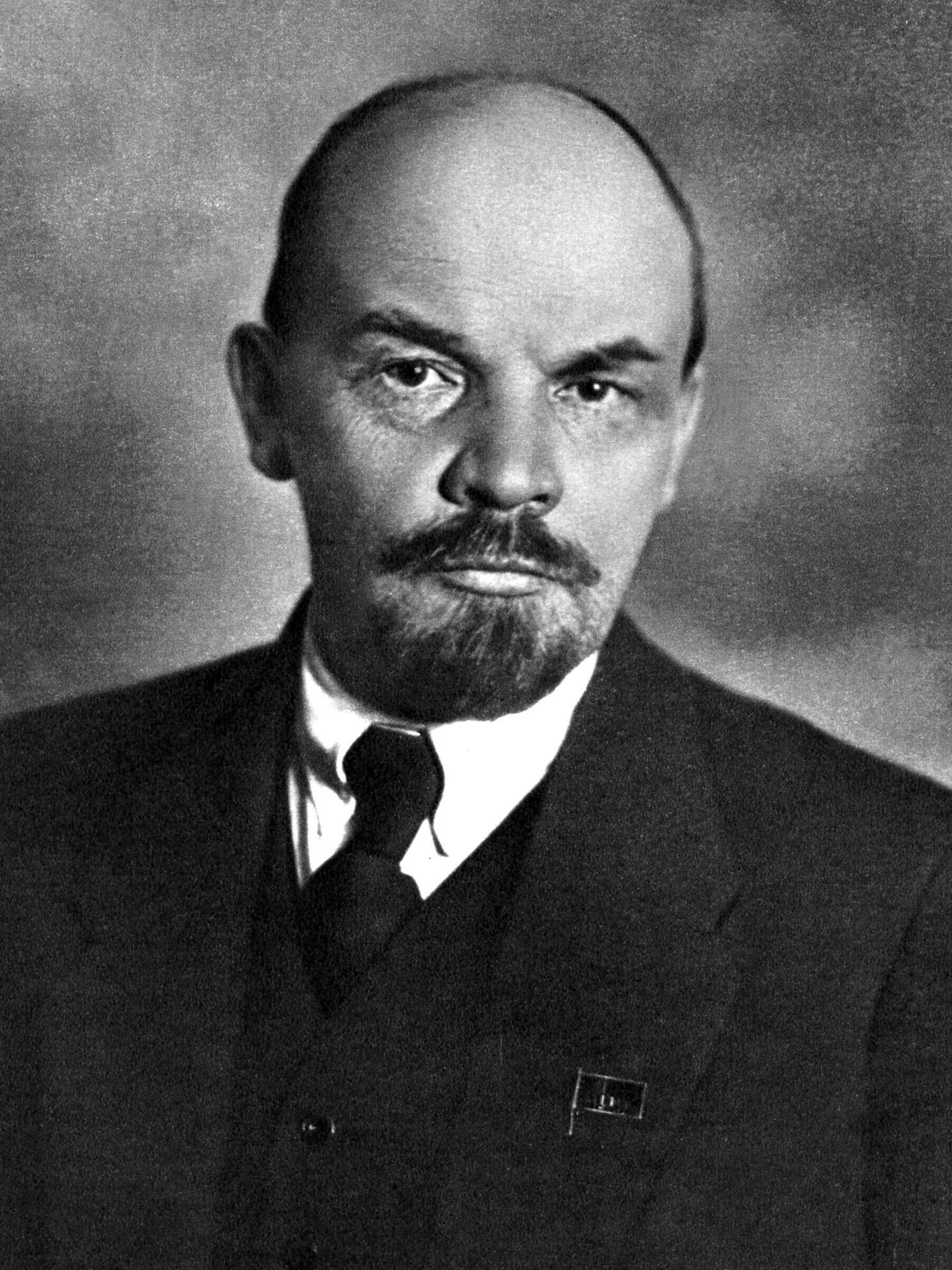
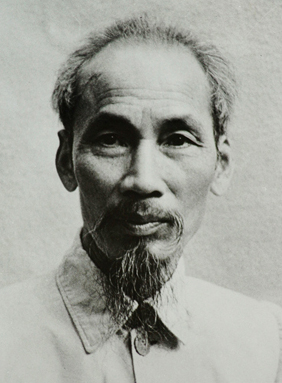
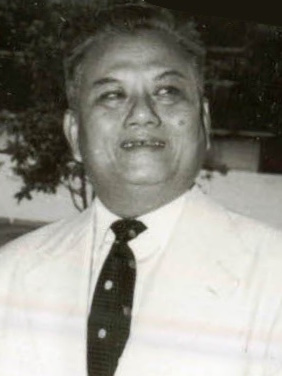
The four most important contributors to the ideology of the LPRP (top-down, left to right): Karl Marx, Vladimir Lenin, Ho Chi Minh, and Kaysone Phomvihane.

The party is guided by Marxism–Leninism, a synthesis of the ideas of Karl Marx and Vladimir Lenin, and Kaysone Phomvihane Thought, which builds upon Marxism–Leninism and Ho Chi Minh Thought. Kaysone Phomvihane said as much in 1970: "The resounding victories of the Indochinese peoples in the past quarter-century cannot be separated from the introduction of Marxism–Leninism into Indochina [and that it] provides guidance for its action and points out practical ways to advance the revolution in Laos." Party pamphlets further note that it was Karl Marx and Friedrich Engels that discovered the universal principles of communism.

In December 1975, at the 3rd Plenary Session of the 2nd Central Committee, the party made clear its intention to skip the capitalist phase in its advance towards socialism. However, the same plenary session considered the socialist transformation of agriculture (collectivisation) as unlikely considering the country's level of development. It went on to say that the LPRP had no intention of abolishing capitalist property relations. The reigning belief was that the country's low level of political and cultural maturity, the LPRP's weak organisational capacity, and the state sector's immaturity made it impossible to skip capitalism and immediately initiate socialist construction. The party thus decided on a long-term strategy of transitioning towards socialism: (1) it sought to eliminate traces of imperialism, colonialism, and feudalism, while building a people's democratic state by extending administrative power from the centre to the grassroots; and (2) normalising people's lives by reestablishing capitalist relations alongside establishing new socialist relations of production.

In October 1975, the 3rd Plenary Session of the 2nd Central Committee further clarified party ideology. Kaysone Phomvihane believed that Laos was facing a dialectical struggle against American imperialism and its local puppets. This he identified as part of a "two-line struggle" between socialism and capitalism. At the 5th Plenary Session of the 2nd Central Committee, Kaysone Phomvihane stated that "the struggle against imperialism, struggle between them and us, class struggle, and struggle to build a new regime were related to 'who is winning over whom' between socialism and capitalism". This ideological change to the "two-line struggle" needed to be followed by speeding up socialist construction. In February 1977, the 4th Plenary Session of the 2nd Central Committee decided that nationalisation and collectivisation were the means to accomplish this. Kaysone Phomvihane quipped "that abolishing feudalistic ownership and exploitation, confiscating the assets of a reactionary feudalist and comprador capitalists ... [and] constructing socialist relations of production in the state economy based on two forms of primary ownership: ownership by all the people and collective ownership."

In 1979, at the 7th Plenary Session of the 2nd Central Committee, the party line changed yet again, and now emphasised introducing market relations into the economy. The decision was grounded in the idea that the transition to socialism was a long historical process, and that Laos was still in the early stages of socialism. The party confirmed that the state and collective enterprises would play a major role in the economy, but that state capitalism, private ownership, and individual economic activity would continue and be utilised by the state for socialist construction. According to economist Norihiko Yamada:

... socialism lost its substantial meaning and was no longer considered a realistic national goal. While socialism remained the LPRP's eventual goal, as it does today, the party acknowledged that the transition period would be longer than expected. Even though the party did not abandon socialism, it was unsure how long the transition would be and when socialist construction would be complete. In other words, socialism became ideal. In its place, post-war reconstruction and establishing the necessary foundations for state-building became the realistic goal of the state.

The implications of the 1979 changes did not dawn on the party leadership before the mid-1980s. In the beginning, the market reforms were promoted under the umbrella of the Socialist Economic Management Mechanism, and by 1984 the New Economic Management Mechanism. Both these terms stressed the importance of state management of the economy. The LPRP still deemed "that the state economy, collective economy and state capitalism were based on the principle of a planned economy, whereas the private and individual sectors were based on the principle of commodity-money relations." At the 8th Plenary Session of the 2nd Central Committee, Kaysone Phomvihane told the plenum that the two-line struggle between socialism and capitalism had entered a new and complex stage. At the 3rd National Congress Kaysone Phomvihane further clarified his statement, claiming that the two-line struggle was between those who supported and those who opposed economic reforms. In reaction to opposition from party officials, especially those centred around Nouhak Phoumsavanh, Kaysone Phomvihane introduced the term New Thinking into ideological discourse at the 4th National Congress. The term was defined in opposition to what Kayasone Phomvihane termed "old thinking":

"Previously, we defined the basic struggle in our socialist country as a two-line struggle between socialism and capitalism and argued that with the transition to socialism, we had to resolve this struggle and a struggle between collective ownership and private ownership. This shows a misunderstanding. Although we must distinguish between our enemy and us, as we transition to socialism, based on social conditions in our country, addressing that struggle is not the top priority.

Considering the current socio-economic situation in our country, the most fundamental struggle that the revolution must resolve is the one between old-fashioned forces of production and increasing production to supply the demand in society that is increasing daily."

— Member of the 4th Central Committee Mounkeo Oraboun in his article "The Path from People's Democracy to Socialism, Step by Step", published in the party's theoretical journal Alun Mai (1989).

"Sometimes in the past, they [leaders] did not have the courage to speak frankly about the facts, difficulties and shortcomings of their work with the people, but they were trying to speak about only achievements and victories. That is not a scientific way of thinking, and it is wrong ... Speaking in accordance with facts is new thinking ... Trusting the people, speaking frankly, and talking with people according to facts is the new way of thinking and the new work style. The other way around, not trusting the people, distorting the facts, not revealing the difficulties and shortcomings, are the outdated way of thinking and the old way. Old thinking is subjective and impatient. ... One example of old thinking is to see only negative aspects of a non-socialist economic sector but not to see any of its advantages in economic development and the improvement of people's lives. Therefore, we think that changing the ownership of the means of production is the key to developing a production force, which will automatically lead to the improvement of people's lives."

While economic reforms increased economic growth and raised the standard of living, the reforms also produced what the LPRP termed "negative phenomena" such as corruption, fraud, economic disparity, and income inequality. LPRP Chairman Khamtai Siphandon therefore initiated a campaign to strengthen socialist values, and told a party gathering that "to control the grassroots and people is a serious struggle of 'who will win over whom?' between our enemies and us." Shortly afterwards, Secretariat member Chueang Sombounkhan published in Alun Mai an article that clarified the party's position on socialism: "to prepare for the transition phase it is necessary to reserve a certain period of time, which means 'transition for transition' or 'indirect transition', for reaching socialism. Generally, such a transition path is the longest, a complex and difficult route." In the words of Yamada:

"[the LPRP] claimed that Laos was in transition for transition, or in an ultra-long transition and that the negative aspects of economic growth were caused by this process. The party used this argument to legitimate their line as well as to trivialise the problems. However, even if such a theory could legitimate the long transition to socialism and its concomitant problems, it did not necessarily resolve the gap between socialism and the market economy. In other words, the party did not have a theoretical measure to deal with the problems, except for socialism. Therefore, the party trivialised problems arising from economic development as an ideological struggle."

In 2006, at the 8th National Congress the LPRP sought yet again to clarify its Marxist–Leninist position. It decided that as long as the party's policies were "(i) developing economic power; (ii) strengthening the state and ensuring political stability; and (iii) improving living standards and creating benefits for the people" it was socialist. The Political Report of the 7th Central Committee to the 8th National Congress further stated that "to achieve the long-term goal defined by the party, we must consider industrialisation and modernisation as the priority in development because the socialist transformation has the same target and goal as industrialisation and modernisation." Thus, the party tried to clarify why it was both logical and legitimate to use markets to construct socialism. It claimed that successful nation-state building was a prerequisite for creating socialist conditions. However, by the 9th National Congress, LPRP General Secretary Choummaly Sayasone stressed the importance of strengthening ideological work and understanding:

"[We must] continue to adhere firmly to Marxism–Leninism and socialist ideals, pay attention to research and grasp some [of the] basic principles of Marxism–Leninism, then apply them creatively and appropriately to the real situation of our state by adjusting the [party] line to the requirement of national development. In order to provide direction for the party's actual leadership and to solve problems appropriately, we always learn lessons from practice and stick to the renovation line by opposing dogmatism, primordialism, subjectivism, radicalism and thought not grasping the real situation and principle of renovation."

By 2016, the party had modernised its ideological framework. The 10th National Congress amended the party statute, and Kaysone Phomvihane Thought was added. By adopting Kaysone Phomvihane Thought, the party sought to legitimise party rule and its economic policies further. Its adoption was a breach of party tradition, for the LPRP had never named a theory after an individual before. While the party failed to expound on the term's meaning at the 10th National Congress, the term itself had been used occasionally earlier. To celebrate Kaysone Phomvihane's 85th anniversary in 2006, the LPRP organised the seminar "Kaysone Phomvihane Thought in the Construction and Development of the People's Democratic Regime along the Road of Socialism". The seminar extolled him "as the key thinker and theorist of the party, the initiator of the 1979 reforms, and as an heir to Marx and Vladimir Lenin who creatively applied Marxism-Leninism to Laos." Kaysone Phomvihane Thought was in turn defined as a fundamental theory for the renovation of the party and as a guide for the party and the country.

== International outreach ==
The LPRP maintains party-to-party relations with communist and non-communist parties, alike. It is a regular attendee of the International Meeting of Communist and Workers Parties, an international forum of communist parties. It also maintains close party-to-party relations with the Chinese Communist Party (CCP), the Communist Party of Cuba, the Communist Party of Vietnam (CPV), the Workers' Party of Korea, and the Cambodian People's Party.

The CPV and the CCP usually compete for influence in Laos, but the LPRP remains closest to the CPV. While the CCP often gives aid to Laos and the LPRP, the relationship lacks the rituals that characterise the LPRP–CPV relationship. To exemplify, during a routine visit to Laos in December 2015, the Vietnamese Deputy Prime Minister and Minister of Foreign Affairs Phạm Bình Minh awarded the Order of Independence (Class 2 and 3), Order of Labour (Class 3), and Order of Friendship to his Laotian counterparts for their "outstanding performance" in enhancing ties between Laos and Vietnam. The priority given to ties with the CPV is seen in other areas as well. For instance, upon his election as LPRP General Secretary, Bounnhang Vorachith reached out to his Vietnamese counterpart first and to the CCP at a later date.

== See also ==
- Cambodian People's Party, ruling party since 1979
- Chinese Communist Party, ruling party since 1949
- Communist Party of Cuba, ruling party since 1965
- Communist Party of Vietnam, ruling party of North Vietnam since 1954, ruling party of unified Vietnam since 1975
- Workers' Party of Korea, ruling party (of North Korea) since 1946
