= 6th National Assembly of Laos =

6th National Assembly
- State emblem of the Lao People's Democratic Republic

8 June 2006 – 15 June 2011 (5 years, 3 days) Overview
- Type: Session of the National Assembly of Laos
- Election: 20 March 2016

Leadership
- President: Pany Yathotou
- Vice President: Sengnouan Xayalath; Somphanh Phengkhammy; Bounpone Bouttanavong; Sisay Leudetmounsone

Members
- Total: 115

The 6th National Assembly of Laos was elected by a popular vote on 30 April 2006 and was replaced by the 7th National Assembly on 15 June 2011. Thongsing Thammavong was elected president of the assembly and held that post until 23 December 2010, when he became prime minister, getting replaced by the then vice president, Pany Yathotou.

== Meetings ==
Meeting	Start–end	Length	Session agenda
1st Ordinary Session	TBD	? days	10 items
2nd Ordinary Session	TBD	? days	7 items
3rd Ordinary Session	TBD	? days	? items
4th Ordinary Session	TBD	? days	? items
5th Ordinary Session	TBD	? days	5 items
6th Ordinary Session	TBD	? days	5 items
7th Ordinary Session	TBD	? days	7 items
8th Ordinary Session	TBD	? days	? items
9th Ordinary Session	TBD	? days	? items
10th Ordinary Session	TBD	? days	? items

== Officers ==
=== Presidency ===
Name	Akson Lao	Took office	Left office	Duration
Thongsing Thammavong	ທອງສິງ ທຳມະວົງ	8 June 2006	23 December 2010	4 years and 198 days
Pany Yathotou	ປານີ ຢາທໍຕູ	23 December 2010	15 June 2011	174 days

=== Vice Presidency ===
Rank	Name	Akson Lao	Took office	Left office	Duration
1	Pany Yathotou	ປານີ ຢາທໍຕູ	8 June 2006	23 December 2010	4 years and 198 days
2	Saysomphone Phomvihane	ໄຊສົມພອນ ພົມວິຫານ	8 June 2006	15 June 2011	5 years and 7 days

== Members ==
№	Constituency	Name	Akson Lao	5th NA	7th NA	Gender	National Assembly							LPRP
№	Constituency	Name	Akson Lao	5th NA	7th NA	Gender	STC	LAW	EPF	EAC	SCA	NDC	FOR	8th CC
1	Vientiane C.	Bouasone Bouphavanh	ບົວສອນ ບຸບຜາວັນ	New	Not	Male	—	—	Member	—	—	—	—	Member
2	Vientiane C.	Bountiem Phissamay	ບຸນຕຽມ ພິດສະໄໝ	Old	Not	Male	—	—	—	—	—	—	Member	—
3	Vientiane C.	Kikeo Khaykhamphithoun	ກິແກ້ວ ໄຂຄຳພິທູນ	New	Reelected	Male	—	—	Member	—	—	—	—	Member
4	Vientiane C.	Bounyong Boupha	ບຸນຍົງ ບຸບຜາ	Old	Reelected	Female	—	—	—	—	—	—	Member	—
5	Vientiane C.	Souvanpheng Bouphanouvong	ສຸວັນເພັງ ບຸບຜານຸວົງ	Old	Reelected	Female	—	—	Member	—	—	—	—	—
6	Vientiane C.	Khamphat Pheubobouda	ຄຳພັດ ເພີບໍບຸດາ	New	Not	Male	—	—	—	—	—	Member	—	—
7	Vientiane C.	Bang-on Xayalath	ບັງອອນ ໄຊຍະລາດ	Old	Not	Female	—	—	—	—	—	—	Member	—
8	Vientiane C.	Somphien Xayadeth	ສົົມພຽນ ໄຊຍະເດດ	New	Not	Male	—	—	Member	—	—	—	—	—
9	Vientiane C.	Ounheuane Phothirath	ອຸ່ນເຮືອນ ໂພທິລາດ	Old	Not	Male	—	—	—	Member	—	—	—	—
10	Vientiane C.	Somvandy Nathavongsa	ສົມວັນດີ ນະຖາວົງສາ	New	Not	Male	—	—	—	—	Member	—	—	—
11	Vientiane C.	Khamphuang Choummaly	ຄຳພວງ ຈູມມະລີ	New	Not	Male	—	—	—	—	Member	—	—	—
12	Vientiane C.	Latsanivong Ummarathithada	ລາດສະນີວົງ ອັມມາຣະທິທະດາ	New	Not	Male	—	—	Member	—	—	—	—	—
13	Vientiane C.	Thongvankham Sitthilath	ທອງວັນຄຳ ສິດທິລາດ	Old	Not	Female	—	Member	—	—	—	—	—	—
14	Vientiane C.	Vanpheng Keonakhone	ວັນເພັງ ແກ້ວນະຄອນ	New	Reelected	Female	—	—	—	—	Member	—	—	—
15	Vientiane C.	Bounpone Sisoulath	ບຸນປອນ ສີສຸລາດ	New	Reelected	Male	—	—	Member	—	—	—	—	—
16	Phongsaly	Phaeng Lylavong	ແພງ ລີລາວົງ	New	Not	Male	—	—	Member	—	—	—	—	—
17	Phongsaly	Ousavanh Thiengthetvonga	ອູ່ສະຫວັນ ທ່ຽງເທດວົງສາ	New	Not	Male	—	Member	—	—	—	—	—	—
18	Phongsaly	Khamchanh Sakountava	ຄຳຈັນ ສະກຸນຕະວະ	New	Not	Male	—	—	—	—	Member	—	—	—
19	Luang Namtha	Latsamy Mingboupha	ລັດສະໝີ ມິ່ງບຸບຜາ	Old	Reelected	Female	—	—	—	Member	—	—	—	—
20	Luang Namtha	Vonekham Phetthavong	ວອນຄຳ ເພັດທະວົງ	New	Reelected	Male	—	—	Member	—	—	—	—	—
21	Luang Namtha	Ounkeo Vouthilath	ອຸ່ນແກ້ວ ວຸດທິລາດ	New	Not	Male	—	Member	—	—	—	—	—	—
22	Oudomxay	Phandouangchit Vongsa	ພັນດວງຈິດ ວົງສາ	New	Reelected	Male	—	—	—	—	Member	—	—	Member
23	Oudomxay	Chanhthuem Latmany	ຈັນທຶມ ລັດມານີ	New	Not	Female	—	—	—	—	Member	—	—	—
24	Oudomxay	Khamphaeng Chitavong	ຄຳແພງ ຈິດທະວົງ	New	Not	Male	—	—	Member	—	—	—	—	—
25	Oudomxay	Somchanh Chitvongdeuan	ສົມຈັນ ຈິດວົງເດືອນ	Old	Reelected	Female	—	—	—	Member	—	—	—	—
26	Oudomxay	Siphone Intala	ສີພອນ ອິນທະລາ	New	Not	Male	—	Member	—	—	—	—	—	—
27	Bokeo	Chanhsouk Bounpachit	ຈັນສຸກ ບຸນປະຈິດ	New	Not	Male	—	Member	—	—	—	—	—	—
28	Bokeo	Vixaykone Vannachomchanh	ວິໄຊກອນ ວັນນະຈອມຈັນ	New	Reelected	Male	—	—	Member	—	—	—	—	—
29	Bokeo	Thatsadaphone Nosing	ທັດສະດາພອນ ໜ່ໍສິງ	New	Not	Female	—	—	—	—	Member	—	—	—
30	Luang Prabang	Thongsing Thammavong	ທອງສິງ ທຳມະວົງ	New	Not	Male	Member	—	—	—	—	Member	—	Member
31	Luang Prabang	Khamkeut Phommavongsy	ຄຳເກີດ ພົມມະວົງສີ	New	Not	Male	—	—	—	—	—	Member	—	—
32	Luang Prabang	Vongchanh Phomsavath	ວົງຈັນ ພົງສະຫວັນ	Old	Reelected	Male	—	—	—	Member	—	—	—	—
33	Luang Prabang	Singtan Xayleuxong	ສິງຕັນ ໄຊລືຊົງ	New	Reelected	Male	—	Member	—	—	—	—	—	—
34	Luang Prabang	Somok Kingsada	ສົມອົກ ກິ່ງສະດາ	Old	Reelected	Male	—	—	—	—	—	—	Member	—
35	Luang Prabang	Saysmone Khomthavong	ສາຍສະໝອນ ຄົມທະວົງ	New	Not	Male	—	—	Member	—	—	—	—	—
36	Luang Prabang	Bosaykham Vongdala	ບໍສາຍຄຳ ວົງດາລາ	New	Not	Male	—	—	Member	—	—	—	—	—
37	Luang Prabang	Singkham Phommalath	ສິງຄຳ ພົມມະລາດ	New	Not	Male	—	—	—	—	Member	—	—	—
38	Xayaboury	Duangsavath Souphanouvong	ດວງສະຫວັດ ສຸພານຸວົງ	Old	Reelected	Male	—	Member	—	—	—	—	—	—
39	Xayaboury	Onchanh Phetsalath	ອ່ອນຈັນ ເພັດສະລາດ	New	Not	Male	—	—	—	—	—	Member	—	—
40	Xayaboury	Mek Phanlack	ເມກ ພັນລັກ	Old	Not	Male	—	—	—	—	—	—	Member	—
41	Xayaboury	Bounphak Inthapanya	ບຸນພັກ ອິນທະປັນຍາ	Old	Not	Female	—	—	—	—	Member	—	—	—
42	Xayaboury	Yanyong Sipaseut	ຢັງຢົງ ສີປະເສີດ	New	Not	Male	—	—	Member	—	—	—	—	—
43	Xayaboury	Thongleuan Inpanya	ທອງເລື່ອນ ອິນປັນຍາ	New	Not	Male	—	—	—	—	—	Member	—	—
44	Xayaboury	Amexiong Yialeng	ອາເມ ຊົງເຢຍເລັງ	Old	Not	Male	—	—	—	Member	—	—	—	—
45	Houaphanh	Khamdy Singkhmphat	ຄຳດີ ສິງຄຳພັດ	New	Not	Male	—	—	—	—	—	—	Member	—
46	Houaphanh	Tong Yeutho	ຕົງ ເຢີທໍ	Old	Not	Male	—	—	—	Member	—	—	—	Member
47	Houaphanh	Khamlek Keosomphanh	ຄຳເຫລັກ ແກ້ວສົມພັນ	Old	Not	Male	—	—	—	Member	—	—	—	—
48	Houaphanh	Bouasone Thammaly	ບົວສອນ ທຳມະລີ	New	Not	Male	—	—	Member	—	—	—	—	—
49	Houaphanh	Mysone Thongsaysy	ມີສອນ ທອງໄຊສີ	New	Not	Female	—	Member	—	—	—	—	—	—
50	Houaphanh	Chanhsy Vannavongxay	ຈັນສີ ວັນນະວົງໄຊ	New	Not	Female	—	—	—	—	Member	—	—	—
51	Xiangkhouang	Khamsing Sayakone	ຄຳສິງ ໄຊຍະກອນ	Old	Not	Male	Member	—	Member	—	—	—	—	—
52	Xiangkhouang	Outhen Masisonxay	ອຸເທນ ມາສີຊົນໄຊ	Old	Not	Female	—	—	—	—	—	—	Member	—
53	Xiangkhouang	Khamsing Daxaophouan	ຄຳສິງ ດາຊາວພວນ	New	Not	Male	—	—	—	—	Member	—	—	—
54	Xiangkhouang	Somdy Sitthilath	ສົມດີ ສິດທິລາດ	New	Not	Male	—	Member	—	—	—	—	—	—
55	Xiangkhouang	Bouaphan Likaya	ບົວພັນ ລິໄກຢາ	New	Not	Female	—	—	—	Member	—	—	—	—
56	Vientiane P.	Thongloun Sisoulith	ທອງລຸນ ສີສຸລິດ	Old	Not	Male	—	—	—	—	—	—	Member	Member
57	Vientiane P.	Khammeung Phongthady	ຄຳເມິງ ພົງທະດີ	Old	Not	Male	—	—	Member	—	—	—	—	—
58	Vientiane P.	Duangdy Outthachak	ດວງດີ ອຸດທະຈັກ	Old	Reelected	Male	Member	—	—	—	Member	—	—	—
59	Vientiane P.	Khammany Inthirath	ຄຳມະນີ ອິນທິລາດ	Old	Reelected	Male	—	—	Member	—	—	—	—	—
60	Vientiane P.	Singkham Khongsavan	ສິງຄຳ ຄົງສະຫວັນ	New	Not	Female	—	—	—	—	—	—	Member	—
61	Vientiane P.	Somdy Keodalavin	ສົມດີ ແກ້ວດາລາວິນ	New	Reelected	Male	—	—	—	Member	—	—	—	—
62	Vientiane P.	Thonkeo Phanthavong	ທ່ອນແກ້ວ ພັນທະວົງ	New	Not	Female	—	—	—	—	Member	—	—	—
63	Vientiane P.	Inkham Phandara	ອິນຄຳ ພັນດາລາ	Old	Not	Female	—	Member	—	—	—	—	—	—
64	Bolikhamxay	Khamphanh Sithidampha	ຄຳພັນ ສິດທິດຳພາ	New	Not	Male	—	—	—	—	Member	—	—	—
65	Bolikhamxay	Pany Yathotou	ປານີ ຢາທໍຕູ	Old	Reelected	Female	Member	Member	—	—	—	—	—	Member
66	Bolikhamxay	Inta Saymounkham	ອິນຕາ ໄຊມູນຄຳ	Old	Not	Female	—	—	Member	—	—	—	—	—
67	Bolikhamxay	Chuangchanh Lassavong	ຈວງຈັນ ລາດສະວົງ	New	Not	Male	—	—	—	—	—	Member	—	—
68	Bolikhamxay	Phaithoun Kitilath	ໄພທູນ ກິດຕິລາດ	New	Not	Male	—	Member	—	—	—	—	—	—
69	Khammouane	Khamveo Sikhotchounlamaly	ຄຳແວວ ສີໂຄດຈຸນລະມາລີ	New	Not	Male	Member	—	—	—	—	Member	—	—
70	Khammouane	Somnuek Sosmchanh	ສົມນຶກ ໂສມຈັນ	New	Not	Male	—	Member	—	—	—	—	—	—
71	Khammouane	Phaithoun Xayakoummane	ໄພບູນ ໄຊຍະກຸມມານ	New	Not	Female	—	—	—	—	Member	—	—	—
72	Khammouane	Inthava Moundala	ອິນທະຫວາ ມູນດາລາ	New	Not	Male	—	Member	—	—	—	—	—	—
73	Khammouane	Onma Lasavong	ອ່ອນມາ ລາຊາວົງ	New	Not	Male	—	—	Member	—	—	—	—	—
74	Khammouane	Bounnhong Khinsamone	ບຸນຍົງ ຄິນສະໝອນ	New	Reelected	Male	—	—	—	Member	—	—	—	—
75	Khammouane	Phongsanhe Youtitham	ພົງສະເນ່ ຍຸຕິທຳ	New	Not	Male	—	—	—	Member	—	—	—	—
76	Savannakhet	Saysomphone Phomvihane	ໄຊສົມພອນ ພົມວິຫານ	Old	Reelected	Male	Member	—	—	—	—	—	Member	Member
77	Savannakhet	Khamphuei Panthachon	ຄຳຜຸຍ ເຜີນທະຈອນ	New	Not	Male	—	—	Member	—	—	—	—	—
78	Savannakhet	Keyoun Nhotsayviboun	ເກຍຸນ ຍົດໄຊວິບູນ	Old	Not	Male	Member	Member	—	—	—	—	—	—
79	Savannakhet	Koukeo Akkhamonti	ກຸແກ້ວ ອັກຄະມົນຕີ	Old	Reelected	Male	—	—	—	—	—	—	Member	—
80	Savannakhet	Vankham Inthachak	ຫວັນຄຳ ອິນທະຈັກ	New	Not	Male	—	—	—	Member	—	—	—	—
81	Savannakhet	Nam Viyaketh	ນາມ ວິຍະເກດ	Old	Not	Male	—	—	Member	—	—	—	—	Member
82	Savannakhet	Thongteun Sayasen	ທອງເຕີນ ໄຊຍະເສນ	Old	Not	Male	Member	—	—	—	Member	—	—	—
83	Savannakhet	Ti Phommasak	ຕີ ພົມະສັກ	New	Not	Male	—	—	—	—	—	—	Member	—
84	Savannakhet	Somphet Inthathilath	ສົມເພັດ ອິນທິລາດ	Old	Not	Male	—	Member	—	—	—	—	—	—
85	Savannakhet	Lamgneun Paseutxaya	ລຳເງິນ ປະເສີດໄຊຍາ	New	Not	Male	—	—	—	—	—	Member	—	—
86	Savannakhet	Somboun Sonthikoummane	ສົມບູນ ສົນທິກຸມມານ	Old	Not	Male	—	Member	—	—	—	—	—	—
87	Savannakhet	Bounyeuan Thitphouthavong	ບຸນເຍື້ອນ ທິດພຸດທະວົງ	New	Not	Female	—	—	—	—	Member	—	—	—
88	Savannakhet	Phimmaha Sengkhamyong	ພິມມະຫາ ແສງຄຳຢອງ	Old	Not	Male	—	—	—	—	—	Member	—	—
89	Savannakhet	Bounnhong Xaypanya	ບຸນຍົງ ໄຊປັນຍາ	New	Reelected	Male	—	—	—	—	Member	—	—	—
90	Savannakhet	Bountem Xouangsayavong	ບຸນເຕັມ ຊວ່ງສາຍະວົງ	New	Reelected	Male	—	—	—	Member	—	—	—	—
91	Savannakhet	Bounmy Khadtivong	ບຸນມີ ຂັນຕິວົງ	Old	Not	Male	—	—	Member	—	—	—	—	—
92	Saravan	Somxay Pholakhamphi	ສົມໄຊ ພູລະຄຳມະນີ	Old	Not	Male	—	—	—	—	—	Member	—	—
93	Saravan	Phouvieng Saithammavong	ພູວຽງ ສາຍທຳມະວົງ	Old	Not	Male	—	—	Member	—	—	—	—	—
94	Saravan	Thavone Tandavong	ຖາວອນ ຕັນດາວົງ	New	Not	Male	—	—	—	—	—	Member	—	—
95	Saravan	Davone Vangvichit	ດາວອນ ຫວ່າງວິຈິດ	New	Reelected	Male	—	Member	—	—	—	—	—	—
96	Saravan	Vaenphet Phadavong	ແຫວນເພັດ ວົງດາລາ	New	Not	Male	—	Member	—	—	—	—	—	—
97	Saravan	Manyxong Luesisamout	ມະນີຊົງ ລືສີສະໝຸດ	New	Not	Female	—	—	—	—	Member	—	—	—
98	Champasak	Somphone Kagnong-Ek	ສົມພອນ ຂະຫຍອງເອກ	New	Not	Male	—	—	—	Member	—	—	—	—
99	Champasak	Somphou Duangsavan	ສົມພູ ດວງສະຫວັນ	New	Not	Male	—	—	—	—	Member	—	—	—
100	Champasak	Phonethep Pholsena	ພອນເທບ ພົນເສນາ	Old	Reelected	Male	—	—	—	—	Member	—	—	—
101	Champasak	Sithong Thongkeo	ສີທອງ ທອງແກ້ວ	Old	Not	Male	—	—	Member	—	—	—	—	—
102	Champasak	Meksavanh Phomphithak	ເມກສະຫວັນ ພົມພິທັກ	Old	Reelected	Male	—	Member	—	—	—	—	—	—
103	Champasak	Bouangeun Xaphouvong	ບົວເງິນ ຊາພູວົງ	Old	Not	Male	—	—	—	—	Member	—	—	—
104	Champasak	Nickkham Bouasisouk	ນາງ ນິກຄຳ ບົວສີສຸກ	New	Not	Male	—	—	Member	—	—	—	—	—
105	Champasak	Sikhamtak Mitalay	ສີຄຳຕາກ ມິຕາໄລ	New	Not	Male	—	—	—	—	—	—	Member	—
106	Champasak	Sifong Boudta	ສີຟອງ ບູຕາ	Old	Not	Male	—	—	—	—	—	Member	—	—
107	Champasak	Kisin Siphangnam	ກິສິນ ສີປັນຍາ	New	Not	Male	—	Member	—	—	—	—	—	—
108	Champasak	Saphaothong Vanthavisone	ສະເພົາທອງ ວານທະວີວອນ	New	Not	Male	—	—	—	Member	—	—	—	—
109	Champasak	Bounmak Thipphasone	ບຸນມາ ທິບພະໄຊ	New	Not	Male	—	—	—	—	Member	—	—	—
110	Sekong	Thongphan Chanthalanonh	ທອງພັນ ຈັນທະລານົນ	Old	Not	Female	Member	—	—	Member	—	—	—	—
111	Sekong	Phonephet Khewlavong	ພອນເພັດ ຄິວລະວົງ	New	Not	Male	—	—	Member	—	—	—	—	—
112	Sekong	Chanhom Mahaxay	ຈັນຫອມ ມະຫາໄຊ	New	Not	Female	—	—	—	—	Member	—	—	—
113	Attapeu	Vassady Khotyotha	ຫວັດສະດີ ໂຄດໂຍທາ	New	Not	Female	—	Member	—	—	—	—	—	—
114	Attapeu	Somvang Thammasith	ສົມຫວັງ ທຳມະສິດ	New	Reelected	Male	—	—	—	—	—	Member	—	—
115	Attapeu	Bounnan Bounyaseng	ບຸນນານ ບຸນຍະແສງ	New	Not	Female	—	—	—	Member	—	—	—	—
