= 5th National Assembly of Laos =

5th National Assembly
- State emblem of the Lao People's Democratic Republic

30 September 2002 – 8 June 2006 (13 years, 252 days) Overview
- Type: Session of the National Assembly of Laos
- Election: 24 February 2002

Leadership
- President: Pany Yathotou
- Vice President: Sengnouan Xayalath; Somphanh Phengkhammy; Bounpone Bouttanavong; Sisay Leudetmounsone

Members
- Total: 109

The 5th National Assembly of Laos was elected by a popular vote on 24 February 2002 and was replaced by the 6th National Assembly on 8 June 2006.

== Meetings ==
Meeting	Start–end	Length	Session agenda
1st Ordinary Session	TBD	26 days	10 items
2nd Ordinary Session	TBD	20 days	7 items
3rd Ordinary Session	TBD	26 days	? items
4th Ordinary Session	TBD	25 days	? items
5th Ordinary Session	TBD	14 days	5 items
6th Ordinary Session	TBD	23 days	5 items
7th Ordinary Session	TBD	14 days	7 items
8th Ordinary Session	TBD	22 days	? items
9th Ordinary Session	TBD	7 days	? items
10th Ordinary Session	TBD	16 days	? items

== Members ==
№	Constituency	Name	Akson Lao	4th NA	6th NA	Gender	National Assembly							LPRP
№	Constituency	Name	Akson Lao	4th NA	6th NA	Gender	STC	LAW	EPF	EAC	SCA	NDC	FOR	7th CC
1	Vientiane C.	Thongloun Sisoulith		New	Not	Male	—	—	—	—	—	—	—	—
2	Vientiane C.	Bountiem Phissamay		New	Not	Male	—	—	—	—	—	—	—	—
3	Vientiane C.	Kham-ouane Boupha		New	Not	Male	—	—	—	—	—	—	—	—
4	Vientiane C.	Somok Kingsada		New	Not	Male	—	—	—	—	—	—	—	—
5	Vientiane C.	Saythong Keodouangdy		New	Not	Male	—	—	—	—	—	—	—	—
6	Vientiane C.	Bang-on Xayalath		New	Not	Male	—	—	—	—	—	—	—	—
7	Vientiane C.	Souvanpheng Bouphanouvong		New	Not	Female	—	—	—	—	—	—	—	—
8	Vientiane C.	Thongmy Phomvixay		New	Not	Male	—	—	—	—	—	—	—	—
9	Vientiane C.	Thongdam Xaiyakassa		New	Not	Male	—	—	—	—	—	—	—	—
10	Vientiane C.	Thongvankham Sitthilath		New	Not	Female	—	—	—	—	—	—	—	—
11	Vientiane C.	Viseth Savengsuksa		New	Not	Male	—	—	—	—	—	—	—	—
12	Vientiane C.	Ounheuane Phothirath		New	Not	Male	—	—	—	—	—	—	—	—
13	Phongsaly	Khamsane Souvong		New	Not	Male	—	—	—	—	—	—	—	—
14	Phongsaly	Chansouk Silavong		New	Not	Female	—	—	—	—	—	—	—	—
15	Phongsaly	Afu Laoly		New	Not	Male	—	—	—	—	—	—	—	—
16	Luang Namtha	Latsamy Mingboupha		New	Not	Female	—	—	—	—	—	—	—	—
17	Luang Namtha	Aloun Lokhamlouy		New	Not	Male	—	—	—	—	—	—	—	—
18	Luang Namtha	Channong Sontaath		New	Not	Male	—	—	—	—	—	—	—	—
19	Oudomxay	Thongphan Chanthalanonh		New	Not	Female	—	—	—	—	—	—	—	—
20	Oudomxay	Bounlom Xaiyavong		New	Not	Male	—	—	—	—	—	—	—	—
21	Oudomxay	Khamlong Soulivong		New	Not	Male	—	—	—	—	—	—	—	—
22	Oudomxay	Yaleu Tongeng		New	Not	Male	—	—	—	—	—	—	—	—
23	Oudomxay	Somchanh Chitvongdeuan		New	Not	Female	—	—	—	—	—	—	—	—
24	Bokeo	Bounlam Viengsavanh		New	Not	Male	—	—	—	—	—	—	—	—
25	Bokeo	Bouasing Silipanya		New	Not	Female	—	—	—	—	—	—	—	—
26	Bokeo	Thongsy Viengvankham		New	Not	Male	—	—	—	—	—	—	—	—
27	Luang Prabang	Vongchanh Phomsavath		New	Not	Male	—	—	—	—	—	—	—	—
28	Luang Prabang	Vongpheth Saikeuyachongtoua		New	Not	Male	—	—	—	—	—	—	—	—
29	Luang Prabang	Douangsavath Souphanouvong		New	Not	Male	—	—	—	—	—	—	—	—
30	Luang Prabang	Bounxou Heuangthonexay		New	Not	Male	—	—	—	—	—	—	—	—
31	Luang Prabang	Khamphay Latsamy		New	Not	Male	—	—	—	—	—	—	—	—
32	Luang Prabang	Khampheng Heuangviseth		New	Not	Male	—	—	—	—	—	—	—	—
33	Luang Prabang	Amone Sirivong		New	Not	Female	—	—	—	—	—	—	—	—
34	Luang Prabang	Vanthong Phommaly		New	Not	Female	—	—	—	—	—	—	—	—
35	Xayaboury	Onechanh Thammavong		Old	Not	Female	—	—	—	—	—	—	—	—
36	Xayaboury	Mek Phanlack		New	Not	Male	—	—	—	—	—	—	—	—
37	Xayaboury	Bounphak Inthapanya		New	Not	Female	—	—	—	—	—	—	—	—
38	Xayaboury	Bounthone Chitvilaphonh		New	Not	Male	—	—	—	—	—	—	—	—
39	Xayaboury	Somlith Peuakkeo		New	Not	Male	—	—	—	—	—	—	—	—
40	Xayaboury	Tong Yeutho		New	Not	Male	—	—	—	—	—	—	—	—
41	Xayaboury	Amexiong Yialeng		New	Not	Male	—	—	—	—	—	—	—	—
42	Houaphanh	Chaleun Yiapaoher		New	Not	Male	—	—	—	—	—	—	—	—
43	Houaphanh	Khamphanh Phimmavong		New	Not	Male	—	—	—	—	—	—	—	—
44	Houaphanh	Duangdy Outthachak		New	Not	Male	—	—	—	—	—	—	—	—
45	Houaphanh	Bounmy Singthonphanh		New	Not	Male	—	—	—	—	—	—	—	—
46	Houaphanh	Bounthanh Boungkhoun		New	Not	Male	—	—	—	—	—	—	—	—
47	Xiangkhouang	Outhen Masisonxay		New	Not	Female	—	—	—	—	—	—	—	—
48	Xiangkhouang	Phimmaha Sengkhamyong		New	Not	Male	—	—	—	—	—	—	—	—
49	Xiangkhouang	Pany Yathotou		Old	Not	Female	—	—	—	—	—	—	—	—
50	Xiangkhouang	Khamdy Onlavong		New	Not	Male	—	—	—	—	—	—	—	—
51	Vientiane P.	Venthong Louangvilay		New	Not	Male	—	—	—	—	—	—	—	—
52	Vientiane P.	Khammeung Phongthady		New	Not	Male	—	—	—	—	—	—	—	—
53	Vientiane P.	Khammay Anousone		New	Not	Male	—	—	—	—	—	—	—	—
54	Vientiane P.	Khamsing Sayakone		New	Not	Male	—	—	—	—	—	—	—	—
55	Vientiane P.	Sanith Sangkham		New	Not	Male	—	—	—	—	—	—	—	—
56	Vientiane P.	Inkham Phandara		New	Not	Female	—	—	—	—	—	—	—	—
57	Bolikhamxay	Bouasy Lovansay		New	Not	Male	—	—	—	—	—	—	—	—
58	Bolikhamxay	Khamphanh Sitthidampha		New	Not	Male	—	—	—	—	—	—	—	—
59	Bolikhamxay	Inta Saymounkham		New	Not	Female	—	—	—	—	—	—	—	—
60	Bolikhamxay	Somchai Xonglavang		New	Not	Male	—	—	—	—	—	—	—	—
61	Khammouane	Thaiyaphone Singthong		New	Not	Male	—	—	—	—	—	—	—	—
62	Khammouane	Khamlek Keosomphanh		New	Not	Male	—	—	—	—	—	—	—	—
63	Khammouane	Bounpone Boudtanavong		New	Not	Male	—	—	—	—	—	—	—	—
64	Khammouane	Phamy Soumaly		New	Not	Female	—	—	—	—	—	—	—	—
65	Khammouane	Khammany Inthirath		New	Not	Male	—	—	—	—	—	—	—	—
66	Khammouane	Samane Souvannasao		New	Not	Male	—	—	—	—	—	—	—	—
67	Savannakhet	Saysomphone Phomvihane		New	Not	Male	—	—	—	—	—	—	—	—
68	Savannakhet	Thongteun Sayasen		New	Not	Male	—	—	—	—	—	—	—	—
69	Savannakhet	Keyoun Nhotsayviboun		New	Not	Male	—	—	—	—	—	—	—	—
70	Savannakhet	Khampheuy Phanthachone		New	Not	Male	—	—	—	—	—	—	—	—
71	Savannakhet	Akhom Tounalom		New	Not	Male	—	—	—	—	—	—	—	—
72	Savannakhet	Nam Viyaketh		New	Not	Male	—	—	—	—	—	—	—	—
73	Savannakhet	Koukeo Akkhamonti		New	Not	Male	—	—	—	—	—	—	—	—
74	Savannakhet	Somboun Sonthikoummane		New	Not	Male	—	—	—	—	—	—	—	—
75	Savannakhet	Somchanh Chouangbaykham		New	Not	Male	—	—	—	—	—	—	—	—
76	Savannakhet	Lamngeun Khampaseutsaya		New	Not	Male	—	—	—	—	—	—	—	—
77	Savannakhet	Bounyong Boupha		New	Not	Female	—	—	—	—	—	—	—	—
78	Savannakhet	Bouangeun Xaphouvong		New	Not	Male	—	—	—	—	—	—	—	—
79	Savannakhet	Nidthana Phothisane		New	Not	Female	—	—	—	—	—	—	—	—
80	Savannakhet	Bounkeut Bounphaacksone		New	Not	Male	—	—	—	—	—	—	—	—
81	Savannakhet	Somphet Inthathilath		New	Not	Male	—	—	—	—	—	—	—	—
82	Savannakhet	Bounmy Khadtivong		New	Not	Female	—	—	—	—	—	—	—	—
83	Saravan	Nouing Hengsombath		New	Not	Male	—	—	—	—	—	—	—	—
84	Saravan	Phouvieng Saithammavong		New	Not	Male	—	—	—	—	—	—	—	—
85	Saravan	Thongsa Panyasith		New	Not	Male	—	—	—	—	—	—	—	—
86	Saravan	Mongkhon Vilay		New	Not	Male	—	—	—	—	—	—	—	—
87	Saravan	Somxay Pholakhamphi		New	Not	Male	—	—	—	—	—	—	—	—
88	Saravan	Venphet Latdavong		New	Not	Male	—	—	—	—	—	—	—	—
89	Champasak	Samane Vignaket		Old	Not	Male	—	—	—	—	—	—	—	—
90	Champasak	Sengkham Phomkhe		New	Not	Male	—	—	—	—	—	—	—	—
91	Champasak	Sompone Khagnong-ek		New	Not	Male	—	—	—	—	—	—	—	—
92	Champasak	Phetsamone Vongphouthone		New	Not	Male	—	—	—	—	—	—	—	—
93	Champasak	Sanyahack Phomvihane		New	Not	Male	—	—	—	—	—	—	—	—
94	Champasak	Meksavanh Phomphithak		New	Not	Male	—	—	—	—	—	—	—	—
95	Champasak	Sithong Thongkeo		New	Not	Male	—	—	—	—	—	—	—	—
96	Champasak	Phonethep Pholsena		New	Not	Male	—	—	—	—	—	—	—	—
97	Champasak	Bounkeuth Sangsomsack		New	Not	Male	—	—	—	—	—	—	—	—
98	Champasak	Sisay Leudethmounsone		New	Not	Female	—	—	—	—	—	—	—	—
99	Champasak	Sipaseuth Sensavath		New	Not	Male	—	—	—	—	—	—	—	—
100	Champasak	Sifong Boudta		New	Not	Male	—	—	—	—	—	—	—	—
101	Sekong	Chanthaboun Keosanga		New	Not	Male	—	—	—	—	—	—	—	—
102	Sekong	Bounhieng Bounchith		New	Not	Female	—	—	—	—	—	—	—	—
103	Sekong	Sida Souvannasay		New	Not	Male	—	—	—	—	—	—	—	—
104	Attapeu	Vanthong Viengphachanh		New	Not	Male	—	—	—	—	—	—	—	—
105	Attapeu	Let Xayaphone		New	Not	Male	—	—	—	—	—	—	—	—
106	Attapeu	Olay Kongbouakham		New	Not	Female	—	—	—	—	—	—	—	—
107	Xaysomboun	Vanna Tho Yiatu		New	Not	Male	—	—	—	—	—	—	—	—
108	Xaysomboun	Singxay Vanthongthib		New	Not	Male	—	—	—	—	—	—	—	—
109	Xaysomboun	Bounsouk Soundara		New	Not	Male	—	—	—	—	—	—	—	—
