= 7th National Assembly of Laos =

Legislature of Laos, 2011–2016

7th National Assembly
- State emblem of the Lao People's Democratic Republic

15 June 2011 – 20 April 2016 (4 years, 310 days) Overview
- Type: Session of the National Assembly of Laos
- Election: 20 March 2016

Leadership
- President: Pany Yathotou
- Vice President: Sengnouan Xayalath; Somphanh Phengkhammy; Bounpone Bouttanavong; Sisay Leudetmounsone

Members
- Total: 132

The 7th National Assembly of Laos was elected by a popular vote on 30 April 2011 and was replaced by the 8th National Assembly on 20 April 2016. Pany Yathotou was reelected as president, and the assembly passed the second amendment to the Constitution of Laos in its 10th Ordinary Session.

== Meetings ==
Meeting	Start–end	Length	Session agenda
1st Ordinary Session	TBD	26 days	10 items
2nd Ordinary Session	TBD	20 days	7 items
3rd Ordinary Session	TBD	26 days	? items
4th Ordinary Session	TBD	25 days	? items
5th Ordinary Session	TBD	14 days	5 items
6th Ordinary Session	TBD	23 days	5 items
7th Ordinary Session	TBD	14 days	7 items
8th Ordinary Session	TBD	22 days	? items
9th Ordinary Session	TBD	7 days	? items
10th Ordinary Session	TBD	16 days	? items

== Presidency ==
Rank	Title	Name	Akson Lao	Took office	Left office	Duration
1	President of the National Assembly of Laos	Pany Yathotou	ປານີ ຢາທໍ່ຕູ້	15 June 2011	20 April 2016	4 years and 310 days
2	Vice President of the National Assembly of Laos	Saysomphone Phomvihane	ໄຊສົມພອນ ພົມວິຫານ	15 June 2011	20 April 2016	4 years and 310 days
3	Vice President of the National Assembly of Laos	Somphanh Phengkhammy	ສົມພັນ ແພງຄຳມີ	15 June 2011	20 April 2016	4 years and 310 days

== Members ==
№	Constituency	Name	Akson Lao	6th NA	8th NA	Gender	National Assembly							LPRP
№	Constituency	Name	Akson Lao	6th NA	8th NA	Gender	STC	LAW	EPF	EAC	SCA	NDC	FOR	9th CC
1	Vientiane C.	Khampheuy Panmalaythong	ຄຳເຜີຍ ປານມະໄລທອງ	New	Not	Male	—	—	—	—	—	—	—	—
2	Vientiane C.	Kikeo Khaykhamphithoune	ກິແກ້ວ ໄຂຄຳພິທູນ	Old	Not	Male	—	—	Member	—	—	—	—	—
3	Vientiane C.	Duangsavath Souphanouvong	ດວງສະຫວັດ ສຸພານຸວົງ	Old	Not	Male	—	Member	—	—	—	—	—	—
4	Vientiane C.	Souvanpheng Bouphanouvong	ສຸວັນເພັງ ບຸບຜານຸວົງ	Old	Reelected	Female	Member	—	Member	—	—	—	—	—
5	Vientiane C.	Bua-Ngeun Xaphouvong	ບົວເງິນ ຊາວພູວົງ	New	Not	Male	—	—	—	—	—	—	—	—
6	Vientiane C.	Vanpheng Keonakhone	ວັນເພັງ ແກ້ວນະຄອນ	Old	Reelected	Female	—	—	—	—	—	—	—	—
7	Vientiane C.	Koukeo Akkhamonti	ກຸແກ້ວ ອັກຄະມົນຕີ	Old	Not	Male	Member	—	—	—	—	—	Member	—
8	Vientiane C.	Bounyong Boupha	ບຸນຍົງ ບຸບຜາ	Old	Not	Female	—	—	—	—	—	—	Member	—
9	Vientiane C.	Somvang Thammasith	ສົມຫວັງ ທຳມະສິດ	Old	Not	Male	—	—	—	—	—	—	—	—
10	Vientiane C.	Buakham Thipphavong	ບົວຄຳ ທິບພະວົງ	New	Reelected	Female	—	—	—	—	—	—	—	—
11	Vientiane C.	Khamfong Phoumvongxay	ຄຳຟອງ ພູມວົງໄຊ	New	Reelected	Female	—	—	—	Member	—	—	—	—
12	Vientiane C.	Lasanivong Amarathithada	ລາດຊະນີວົງ ອະມາຣາທິທາດາ	New	Not	Male	—	—	—	—	—	—	—	—
13	Vientiane C.	Bounpheng Sitthisak	ບຸນເພັງ ສິດທິສັກ	New	Not	Male	—	—	—	—	—	—	—	—
14	Vientiane C.	Sisaliew Savengsuksa	ສີສະຫຼຽວ ສະແຫວງສຶກສາ	New	Not	Male	—	—	—	—	—	—	—	—
15	Vientiane C.	Ketkeo Sihalath	ເກດແກ້ວ ສີຫາລາດ	New	Reelected	Male	—	—	—	—	—	—	—	—
16	Phongsaly	Khamchan Khamvongchay	ຄຳຈັນ ຄຳວົງໃຈ	New	Not	Male	—	—	—	—	—	—	—	—
17	Phongsaly	Khamping Saengtannalath	ຄຳປິງ ແສງຕານະລາດ	New	Not	Male	—	—	—	—	—	—	—	—
18	Phongsaly	Chansy Saengsomphou	ຈັນສີ ແສງສົມພູ	New	Reelected	Male	—	—	—	—	—	—	—	—
19	Phongsaly	Sikeo Sipachack	ສີແກ້ວ ສີປະຈັກ	New	Not	Male	—	—	—	—	—	—	—	—
20	Phongsaly	Chanmany Namvong	ຈັນມະນີ ນາມວົງ	New	Not	Female	—	—	—	Member	—	—	—	—
21	Luang Namtha	Vonekham Phetthavong	ວອນຄຳ ເພັດທະວົງ	Old	Not	Male	—	—	—	Member	—	—	—	—
22	Luang Namtha	Bandit Pathoumvanh	ບັນດິດ ປະທຸມວັນ	New	Not	Female	—	—	—	—	—	—	—	—
23	Luang Namtha	Khamlek Saydara	ຄຳເຫຼັກ ໄຊດາລາ	New	Not	Male	—	—	—	—	—	—	—	—
24	Luang Namtha	Latsamy Mingboupha	ລັດສະໝີ ມິ່ງບຸບຜາ	Old	Not	Female	—	—	—	—	—	—	—	—
25	Luang Namtha	Kongphet Keobouapha	ກົງເພັດ ແກ້ວບົວພາ	New	Not	Male	—	—	—	—	—	—	—	—
26	Oudomxay	Bounlort Onphachanh	ບຸນລອດ ອ່ອນພະຈັນ	New	Not	Male	—	—	—	—	—	—	—	—
27	Oudomxay	Khamxao Kayxong	ຄຳຊາວ ໄກຊົງ	New	Not	Male	—	—	—	Member	—	—	—	—
28	Oudomxay	Houmphaeng Sitthivong	ຫຸມແພງ ສຸດທິວົງ	New	Not	Male	—	—	—	—	—	—	—	—
29	Oudomxay	Somchanh Chitvongdeuan	ສົມຈັນ ຈິດວົງເດືອນ	Old	Reelected	Female	—	—	—	Member	—	—	—	—
30	Oudomxay	Khamphone Phimmachanh	ຄຳພອນ ພິມມະຈັນ	New	Reelected	Female	—	—	—	—	—	—	—	—
31	Oudomxay	Bounnhong Norkeo	ບຸນຍົງ ໜໍ່ແກ້ວ	New	Not	Male	—	—	—	—	—	—	—	—
32	Bokeo	Vixaykone Vannachomchanh	ວິໄຊກອນ ວັນນະຈອມຈັນ	Old	Not	Male	—	—	Member	Member	—	—	—	—
33	Bokeo	Ounkeo Vouthirath	ອຸ່ນແກ້ວ ວຸທິລາດ	New	Not	Male	Member	—	—	—	—	—	—	—
34	Bokeo	Oulavanh Bounthachak	ອູລາວັນ ບຸນທະຈັກ	New	Not	Male	—	—	—	—	—	—	—	—
35	Bokeo	Khamchomphou Silitham	ຄຳຈອມພູ ສິລິທຳ	New	Reelected	Female	—	—	—	—	—	—	—	—
36	Bokeo	Channuan Ouankhanachak	ຈັນນວນ ອວນຄະນະຈັກ	New	Not	Male	—	—	—	—	—	—	—	—
37	Luang Prabang	Bouathong Phaengsavanh	ບົວທອງ ແພງສະຫວັນ	New	Not	Female	—	—	—	Member	—	—	—	—
38	Luang Prabang	Bounthavy Sisouphanthong	ບຸນທະວີ ສີສຸພັນທອງ	New	Not	Male	—	—	—	—	—	—	—	—
39	Luang Prabang	Singtan Xayleuxong	ສິງຕັນ ໄຊລືຊົງ	Old	Not	Male	—	Member	—	—	—	—	—	—
40	Luang Prabang	Vilay Duangmany	ວິໄລ ດວງມະນີ	New	Not	Male	Member	—	—	—	—	—	—	—
41	Luang Prabang	Houmphanh Thammoungkhoun	ຫຸມພັນ ທຳມຸງຄຸນ	New	Not	Male	—	—	—	—	—	—	—	—
42	Luang Prabang	Bounthone Sitsouvong	ບຸນທອນ ສິດສຸວົງ	New	Not	Male	—	—	—	Member	—	—	—	—
43	Luang Prabang	Amphone Sivilaysak	ອຳພອນ ສີວິໄລສັກ	New	Not	Female	—	—	—	—	—	—	—	—
44	Luang Prabang	Bountham Senphansiri	ບຸນທຳ ແສນພັນສິລິ	New	Not	Male	—	—	—	—	—	—	—	—
45	Luang Prabang	Khamphoui Vannachit	ຄຳຜຸຍ ວັນນະຈິດ	New	Not	Male	—	—	—	—	—	—	—	—
46	Xayaboury	Pany Yathotou	ປານີ ຢາທໍຕູ	Old	Reelected	Female	Member	Member	—	—	—	—	—	—
47	Xayaboury	Khamsouk Thor	ຄຳສຸກ ທໍ່	New	Not	Male	—	—	—	—	—	—	—	—
48	Xayaboury	Vongchanh Phomsavath	ວົງຈັນ ພົມສະຫວັດ	Old	Not	Male	—	—	—	—	—	—	—	—
49	Xayaboury	Thongdy Phabboua-on	ທອງດີ ພັບບົວອອນ	New	Not	Female	—	—	—	Member	—	—	—	—
50	Xayaboury	Khamsouk Vi-inthavong	ຄຳສຸກ ວີອິນທະວົງ	New	Reelected	Male	—	—	—	—	—	—	—	—
51	Xayaboury	Idmany Chanthakhoun	ອິດມະນີ ຈັນທະຄູນ	New	Reelected	Male	—	—	—	—	—	—	—	—
52	Xayaboury	Chanthanom Vongsomchith	ຈັນທະໜອມ ວົງສົມຈິດ	New	Not	Male	—	—	—	—	—	—	—	—
53	Houaphanh	Somphanh Phengkhammy	ສົມພັນ ແພງຄຳມີ	New	Reelected	Male	Member	—	—	Member	—	—	—	—
54	Houaphanh	Khamvone Bounthavong	ຄຳວອນ ບຸນທະວົງ	New	Reelected	Male	—	—	—	Member	—	—	—	—
55	Houaphanh	Phonsouk Thongsombath	ພອນສຸກ ທອງສົມບັດ	New	Not	Male	—	—	—	—	—	—	—	—
56	Houaphanh	Amphaivone Lombounphaeng	ອຳໄພວອນ ລ້ອມບຸນແພງ	New	Reelected	Female	—	—	—	—	—	—	—	—
57	Houaphanh	Vongsack Xaoxuayang	ວົງສັກ ຊາວຊົວຢາງ	New	Not	Male	—	—	—	—	—	—	—	—
58	Houaphanh	Misone Thongxaysy	ມີສອນ ທອງໄຊສີ	New	Not	Female	—	Chair	—	—	—	—	—	—
59	Xiangkhouang	Bounpheng Mounphoxay	ບຸນເພັງ ມູນໂພໄຊ	New	Not	Female	—	—	—	—	—	—	—	—
60	Xiangkhouang	Bounton Chanthaphone	ບຸນຕົ້ນ ຈັນທະພອນ	New	Reelected	Male	—	—	—	Member	—	—	—	—
61	Xiangkhouang	Bouasy Nathavong	ບົວສີ ນາຖາວົງ	New	Not	Female	—	—	—	—	—	—	—	—
62	Xiangkhouang	Somvandy Sisouphanh	ສົມວັນດີ ສີສຸພັນ	New	Not	Male	—	—	—	—	—	—	—	—
63	Xiangkhouang	Khamla Chandala	ຄຳຫລ້າ ຈັນດາລ	New	Not	Male	—	—	—	—	—	—	—	—
64	Xiangkhouang	Vilaysouk Phimmasone	ວິໄລສຸກ ພິມມະສອນ	New	Reelected	Male	—	—	—	—	—	—	—	—
65	Vientiane P.	Duangdy Outthachak	ດວງດີ ອຸດທະຈັກ	Old	Not	Male	Member	—	—	Member	Member	—	—	—
66	Vientiane P.	Bounpheng Sainorlady	ບຸນເພັງ ສາຍນໍລະດີ	New	Reelected	Female	—	—	—	—	—	—	—	—
67	Vientiane P.	Somok Kingsada	ສົມອົກ ກິ່ງສະດາ	Old	Not	Male	—	—	—	—	—	—	—	—
68	Vientiane P.	Somdy Keodalavin	ສົມດີ ແກ້ວດາລາວິນ	Old	Reelected	Male	—	—	—	—	—	—	—	—
69	Vientiane P.	Onsy Saensouk	ອ່ອນສີ ແສນສຸກ	New	Not	Male	—	—	—	—	—	—	—	—
70	Vientiane P.	Chanthaboun Phosalath	ຈັນທະບູນ ໂພສະລາດ	New	Not	Female	—	—	—	—	—	—	—	—
71	Vientiane P.	Khamdeng Silavong	ຄຳແດງ ສີລາວົງ	New	Reelected	Male	—	—	—	—	—	—	—	—
72	Vientiane P.	Bouavanh Thammavong	ບົວວັນ ທຳມະວົງ	New	Reelected	Female	—	—	—	Member	—	—	—	—
73	Vientiane P.	Khamkhen Oudtama	ຄຳເຄນ ອຸດຕະມາ	New	Reelected	Male	—	—	—	—	—	—	—	—
74	Bolikhamxay	Bounma Bouchaleun	ບຸນມາ ບຸຈະເລີນ	New	Not	Male	—	—	—	—	—	—	—	—
75	Bolikhamxay	Buaphan Leekaiya	ບົວພັນ ລີໄກຢາ	New	Reelected	Female	—	—	—	—	—	—	—	—
76	Bolikhamxay	Bounseng Pathammavong	ບຸນເສັງ ປະທຳມະວົງ	New	Not	Male	—	—	—	—	—	—	—	—
77	Bolikhamxay	Chouangchanh Latsavong	ຈວງຈັນ ລາດຊະວົງ	New	Not	Male	—	—	—	—	—	—	—	—
78	Bolikhamxay	Malisa Aphaylath	ມາລີສາ ອາໄພລາດ	New	Not	Female	—	—	—	Member	—	—	—	—
79	Bolikhamxay	Sikhay Sipaseuth	ສີໄຄ ສີປະເສີດ	New	Reelected	Female	—	—	—	—	—	—	—	—
80	Khammouane	Bounnhong Khinsamone	ບຸນຍົງ ຄິນສະໝອນ	Old	Not	Male	—	—	—	—	—	—	—	—
81	Khammouane	Saengthong Phakhounthong	ແສງທອງ ພະຄຸນທອງ	New	Not	Male	—	—	—	—	—	—	—	—
82	Khammouane	Inthava Moundala	ອິນທະຫວາ ມູນດາລາ	New	Not	Male	—	—	—	Member	—	—	—	—
83	Khammouane	Viengmany Chanthanasin	ວຽງມະນີ ຈັນທະນະສິນ	New	Reelected	Female	—	—	—	Member	—	—	—	—
84	Khammouane	Bounpan Douanglaty	ບຸນປັນ ດວງລາຕີ	New	Reelected	Male	—	—	—	—	—	—	—	—
85	Khammouane	Ketsana Latxachack	ເກດສະໜາ ລັດຊະຈັກ	New	Not	Male	—	—	—	—	—	—	—	—
86	Khammouane	Thipphachan Phoxay	ເທິບພະຈັນ ໂພໄຊ	New	Reelected	Male	—	—	—	—	—	—	—	—
87	Savannakhet	Saysomphone Phomvihane	ໄຊສົມພອນ ພົມວິຫານ	Old	Reelected	Male	Member	—	—	—	—	—	Member	—
88	Savannakhet	Vankham Inthichack	ຫວັນຄຳ ອິນທິຈັກ	New	Reelected	Male	—	—	—	—	—	—	—	—
89	Savannakhet	Somphou Douangsavanh	ສົມພູ ດວງສະຫວັນ	New	Reelected	Male	—	—	—	—	Member	—	—	—
90	Savannakhet	Simoun Ounlasy	ສີມູນ ອຸ່ນລາສີ	New	Not	Male	—	—	—	—	—	—	—	—
91	Savannakhet	Somphet Inthathilath	ສົມເພັດ ອິນທະທິລາດ	New	Reelected	Male	—	—	—	Member	—	—	—	—
92	Savannakhet	Bounchanh Sinthavong	ບຸນຈັນ ສິນທະວົງ	New	Not	Male	—	—	—	—	—	—	—	—
93	Savannakhet	Bounnheuane Thidphoutthavong	ບຸນເຍື້ອນ ທິດພຸດທະວົງ	New	Not	Female	—	—	—	—	—	—	—	—
94	Savannakhet	Sonthanou Thammavong	ສອນທະນູ ທຳມະວົງ	New	Not	Male	—	—	—	—	—	—	—	—
95	Savannakhet	Bountem Xouangsayavong	ບຸນເຕັມ ຊວງສາຍະວົງ	Old	Reelected	Male	—	—	—	—	—	—	—	—
96	Savannakhet	Khamphan Khounsacksy	ຄຳພັນ ຄູນສັກສີ	New	Not	Male	—	—	—	Member	—	—	—	—
97	Savannakhet	Bounpone Sisoulath	ບຸນປອນ ສີສຸລາດ	Old	Reelected	Male	—	—	Member	—	—	—	—	—
98	Savannakhet	Bounnhong Xaypanya	ບຸນຍົງ ໄຊປັນຍາ	Old	Not	Male	—	—	—	—	—	—	—	—
99	Savannakhet	Khammany Inthirath	ຄຳມະນີ ອິນທິລາດ	Old	Not	Male	—	—	—	—	—	—	—	—
100	Savannakhet	Thatsadaphone Saengsouliya	ທັດສະດາພອນ ແສງສຸລິຍາ	New	Reelected	Female	—	—	—	Member	—	—	—	—
101	Savannakhet	Somphone Soutthisombath	ສົມພອນ ສຸດທິສົມບັດ	New	Not	Male	—	—	—	—	—	—	—	—
102	Savannakhet	Bounpong Keorodom	ບຸນປົງ ແກ້ວໂຣດົມ	New	Not	Male	—	—	—	—	—	—	—	—
103	Savannakhet	Somchit Kittiyalath	ສົມຈິດ ກິດຕິຍະລາດ	New	Not	Male	—	—	—	—	—	—	—	—
104	Saravan	Davone Vangvichit	ດາວອນ ຫວ່າງວິຈິດ	Old	Not	Male	Member	Chair	—	—	—	—	—	—
105	Saravan	Bounthiem Phommasathith	ບຸນທຽມ ພົມມະສະຖິດ	New	Reelected	Male	—	—	—	—	—	—	—	—
106	Saravan	Suanesavanh Vignaket	ສວນສະຫວັນ ວິຍະເກດ	New	Reelected	Female	—	—	—	—	—	—	—	—
107	Saravan	Manixong Leusisamouth	ມະນີຊົງ ລືສີສະໝຸດ	New	Not	Female	—	—	—	Member	—	—	—	—
108	Saravan	Vaenphet Latdavong	ແຫວນເພັດ ລັດດາວົງ	New	Not	Male	—	—	—	—	—	—	—	—
109	Saravan	Somchay Ounchit	ສົມໃຈ ອຸ່ນຈິດ	New	Not	Male	—	—	—	—	—	—	—	—
110	Saravan	Khanxay Latthahao	ຂັນໄຊ ລັດຖະເຮົ້າ	New	Not	Male	—	—	—	—	—	—	—	—
111	Champasak	Phandouangchit Vongsa	ພັນດວງຈິດ ວົງສາ	Old	Not	Male	—	—	—	Member	—	—	—	—
112	Champasak	Meksavanh Phomphithak	ເມກສະຫວັນ ພົມພິທັກ	Old	Reelected	Male	—	—	—	—	—	—	—	—
113	Champasak	Phonethep Pholsena	ພອນເທບ ພົນເສນາ	Old	Not	Male	Member	—	—	—	—	—	—	—
114	Champasak	Bualin Vongphachanh	ບົວລິນ ວົງພະຈັນ	New	Not	Male	—	—	—	—	—	—	—	—
115	Champasak	Kisinh Sinphanngam	ກິສິນ ສິນພັນງາມ	New	Not	Male	—	—	—	—	—	—	—	—
116	Champasak	Bounthien Thongkeo	ບຸນທຽນ ທອງແກ້ວ	New	Not	Male	—	—	—	—	—	—	—	—
117	Champasak	Singphet Bounsavatthiphanh	ສິງເພັດ ບຸນສະຫວັດທິພັນ	New	Not	Male	—	—	—	—	—	—	—	—
118	Champasak	Pingkham Lasasimma	ປິ່ງຄຳ ລາຊະສີມມາ	New	Not	Female	—	—	—	—	—	—	—	—
119	Champasak	Vannala Soutthichak	ວັນນະລາ ສຸດທິຈັກ	New	Not	Male	—	—	—	Member	—	—	—	—
120	Champasak	Sivanh Outthachak	ສີວັນ ອຸດທະຈັກ	New	Not	Male	—	—	—	—	—	—	—	—
121	Champasak	Vatsana Silima	ວາດສະໜາ ສິລິມາ	New	Not	Female	—	—	—	—	—	—	—	—
122	Champasak	Oudone Singsouvong	ອຸດອນ ສິງສຸວົງ	New	Not	Male	—	—	—	—	—	—	—	—
123	Sekong	Khamdaeng Kommadam	ຄຳແດງ ກົມມະດຳ	New	Not	Male	—	—	—	Member	—	—	—	—
124	Sekong	Bounkham Ngaophasiri	ບຸນຂຳ ເຫງົ້າພະສິຣິ	New	Not	Female	—	—	—	—	—	—	—	—
125	Sekong	Somsanouk Keonimith	ສົມສະໜຸກ ແກ້ວນິມິດ	New	Not	Male	—	—	—	—	—	—	—	—
126	Sekong	Phetsamone Khonpasith	ເພັດສະໝອນ ຄອນປະສິດ	New	Not	Male	—	—	—	—	—	—	—	—
127	Sekong	Haymany Vongnorkeo	ໄຮມະນີ ວົງໜໍ່ແກ້ວ	New	Reelected	Female	—	—	—	—	—	—	—	—
128	Attapeu	Onkeo Phommakone	ອ່ອນແກ້ວ ພົມມະກອນ	New	Not	Male	—	—	—	—	—	—	—	—
129	Attapeu	Bounxay Khammanivong	ບຸນໄຊ ຄຳມະນີວົງ	New	Not	Male	—	—	—	Member	—	—	—	—
130	Attapeu	Phetkeo Heuangpanya	ເພັດແກ້ວ ເຮືອງປັນຍາ	New	Reelected	Male	—	—	—	—	—	—	—	—
131	Attapeu	Xokxay Phimmala	ໂຊກໄຊ ພິມມະລາ	New	Not	Male	—	—	—	—	—	—	—	—
132	Attapeu	Phonmany Khienxayavong	ພອນມະນີ ຂຽນໄຊຍະວົງ	New	Reelected	Female	—	—	—	—	—	—	—	—
