= 8th National Assembly of Laos =

8th National Assembly

20 April 2016 – 22 March 2021 (4 years, 336 days) Overview
- Type: Session of the National Assembly of Laos
- Election: 20 March 2016

Leadership
- President: Pany Yathotou
- Vice President: Sengnouan Xayalath; Somphanh Phengkhammy; Bounpone Bouttanavong; Sisay Leudetmounsone

Members
- Total: 148

The 8th National Assembly of Laos was elected by a popular vote on 20 March 2016 and was replaced by the 9th National Assembly on 22 March 2021. Pany Yathotou was reelected as president.

== Meetings ==
Meeting	Start–end	Length	Session agenda
1st Ordinary Session	20–22 April 2016	26 days	10 items: 1. Work report by Choummaly Sayasone, the President of Laos; 1. approved.; 2. Work report by Thongsing Thammavong, the Prime Minister of Laos, on behalf of the 7th Government of Laos; 1. approved.; 3. Work report by Pany Yathotou, the President of the National Assembly of Laos, on behalf of the 7th National Assembly of Laos and its 7th Standing Committee; 1. approved.; 4. Thongsing Thammavong proposes draft Vision 2030 and Ten-Year Socio-Economic Development Strategy (2016–2025); 1. approved.; 5. Thongsing Thammavong proposes draft Ten-Year Socio-Economic Development Strategy (2016–2025); 1. approved.; 6. Thongsing Thammavong proposes draft 8th Five-Year National Socio-Economic Development Plan (2016–2020); 1. approved.; 7. Thongsing Thammavong proposes draft Five-Year State Budget Plan (2016–2020); 1. approved.; 8. Pany Yathotou proposes on behalf of the 7th Standing Committee the Five-Year Plan on Law-making and Amendments (2016–2020); 1. approved.; 9. Elections; 1. Election of the President of the National Assembly of Laos; 1. Pany Yathotou is elected for a second term.; 2. Election of the Vice President of the National Assembly of Laos; 1. Sengnouan Xayalath, Somphanh Phengkhammy, Bounpone Bouttanavong and Sisay Leudethmounsone were elected; 3. Election of the 8th Presidency of the Lao PDR.; 1. Election of the President of Laos; 1. Bounnhang Vorachith is elected.; 2. Election of the Vice President of Laos; 1. Phankham Viphavanh is elected.; 4. Election of the 8th Government of Laos; 1. Election of the Prime Minister of Laos; 1. Thongloun Sisoulith is elected.; 2. Election of officials as Deputy Prime Minister of Laos; 1. Bounthong Chitmany, Sonexay Siphandone and Somdy Duangdy were elected.; 3. Election of remaining ministers of the 8th Government; 1. elected.; 5. Election of the 8th judiciary of Laos; 1. Election of the President and Head of Office of the Supreme People's Prosecutor; 1. Khamsane Souvong is elected.; 2. Election of the President of the People's Supreme Court; 1. Khamphanh Sitthidampha is elected.; 10. Closing remarks by President Bounnhang Vorachith.
2nd Ordinary Session	24 October – 18 November 2016	3 days	7 items: 1. Report by the 8th Government on the 8th Five-Year National Socio-Economic Development Plan; 1. approved.; 2. Report by the 8th Government on the state budget; 1. approved.; 3. Report by the 8th Government on monetary policy; 1. approved.; 4. Report by the 8th State Audit Organisation on audit work; 1. approved.; 5. Report by the 8th Supreme Public Prosecutor's Office; 1. approved.; 6. Report by the 8th People's Supreme Court; 1. approved.; 7. Debate on law amendments.; 1. Law on Media; 1. passed.; 2. Law on Handing of Petitions and Defence Lawyers; 1. passed.
3rd Ordinary Session	25 April – 18 May 2017	26 days	? items
4th Ordinary Session	16 October – 17 November 2017	25 days	? items
5th Ordinary Session	5–28 June 2018	24 days	5 items: 1. Report by the 8th Government on the implementation of the 8th Five-Year National Socio-Economic Development Plan; 1. approved.; 2. Report by the 8th Government on the implementation of the state budget since the 4th Ordinary Session; 1. approved.; 3. Appointment of judges to the 8th People's Supreme Court; 1. appointed—results not made public.; 4. Debate on draft laws.; 1. Law on Business Conflict Settlement; 1. passed.; 2. Law on Value Added Tax; 1. passed.; 3. Law on the Bank of the Lao PDR; 1. passed.; 4. Law on Social Security; 1. passed.; 5. Law on Family Registration; 1. passed.; 6. Law on Civil Aviation; 1. passed.; 7. Law on Military Officers of the Lao People's Army; 1. passed.; 8. Law on Lao Front For National Construction; 1. passed.; 5. Five new laws proposed.; 1. Laws on Vaccination; 1. passed.; 2. Laws on Residential and Occupational Allocation; 1. passed.; 3. Laws on Signs; 1. passed.; 4. Laws on Public Debt Management; 1. passed.; 5. Laws on War Veterans; 1. passed.
6th Ordinary Session	20 November – 22 December 2018	33 days	5 items: 1. Report by the 8th Government on the implementation of the 8th Five-Year National Socio-Economic Development Plan; 1. approved.; 2. Report by the 8th Government on the implementation of the state budget since the 4th Ordinary Session; 1. approved.; 3. Lawmakers reviewed the implementation of National Assembly resolutions by the 8th Government.; 1. On rural development and poverty reduction; 1. approved.; 2. On healthcare services and their quality; 1. approved.; 3. On loan agreement disputes; 1. approved.; 4. Passing of laws.; 1. Civil Code; 1. passed.; 2. Law on Commercial Banks; 1. passed.; 3. Law on Radiation Safety; 1. passed.; 4. Electronic Signature Law; 1. passed.; 5. Law on Railways; 1. passed.; 6. Law on Health Insurance; 1. passed.; 7. Law on People with Disabilities; 1. passed.; 8. Law on Overseas Representative Offices of the Lao PDR; 1. passed.; 5. Vote on giving official status as ethnic group to Brou people; 1. approved.
7th Ordinary Session	6–25 July 2019	20 days	7 items: 1. Report by the 8th Government on the implementation of the 8th Five-Year National Socio-Economic Development Plan; 1. approved.; 2. Report by the 8th Government on the implementation of the state budget since the 4th Ordinary Session; 1. approved.; 3. Report by the 8th Government on the Implementation of Court Rulings; 1. considered.; 4. Report by the Supreme People's Prosecutor on control of law enforcement by investigate organs; 1. approved.; 5. Lawmakers reviewed the implementation of National Assembly resolutions by the 8th Government.; 1. On repeated issuance of land deeds; 1. approved.; 2. On reforestation and tree plantation; 1. approved.; 3. On human resource development in agriculture, pedagogy, and nursing; 1. approved.; 6. Election; 1. Election of the President of the People's Supreme Court; 1. Khampha Sengdala elected.; 2. Election of Minister to Prime Minister's Office; 1. Vidong Xayasone elected.; 7. Amendment of laws.; 1. Law on Taxation Management; 1. amended.; 2. Law on Income Taxes; 1. amended.; 3. Law on Concise Taxes; 1. amended.; 4. Law on Land; 1. amended.; 5. Law on Forestry; 1. amended.; 6. Law on Vocational Education; 1. amended.; 7. Law on Disaster Management; 1. amended.; 8. Passing of laws.; 1. Three new laws were passed.
8th Ordinary Session	7 November – 6 December 2019	30 days	? items
9th Ordinary Session	24 June – 2 July 2020	9 days	? items
10th Ordinary Session	27 October – 17 November 2020	21 days	? items

== Officers ==
=== Presidency ===
Rank	Title	Name	Akson Lao	Took office	Left office	Duration
1	President of the National Assembly of Laos	Pany Yathotou	ປານີ ຢາທໍ່ຕູ້	20 April 2016	22 March 2021	4 years and 336 days
2	Vice President of the National Assembly of Laos	Sengnouan Xayalath	ແສງນວນ ໄຊຍະລາດ	20 April 2016	22 March 2021	4 years and 336 days
3	Vice President of the National Assembly of Laos	Somphanh Phengkhammy	ສົມພັນ ແພງຄຳມີ	20 April 2016	22 March 2021	4 years and 336 days
4	Vice President of the National Assembly of Laos	Bounpone Bouttanavong	ບຸນປອນ ບຸດຕະນະວົງ	20 April 2016	22 March 2021	4 years and 336 days
5	Vice President of the National Assembly of Laos	Sisay Leudetmounsone	ສີໃສ ລືເດດມູນສອນ	20 April 2016	22 March 2021	4 years and 336 days

=== Secretariat ===
Rank	Title	Name	Akson Lao	Took office	Left office	Duration
1	Secretary-General of the National Assembly of Laos	Suanesavanh Vignaket	ສວນສະຫວັນ ວິຍະເກດ	20 April 2016	22 March 2021	4 years and 336 days
2	Deputy Secretary-General of the National Assembly of Laos	Suban Savabud	ສຸບັນ ສະວະບຸດ	20 April 2016	22 March 2021	4 years and 336 days
3	Deputy Secretary-General of the National Assembly of Laos	Singkham Vongphachan	ສິງຄຳ ວົງພະຈັນ	20 April 2016	22 March 2021	4 years and 336 days

=== Women Caucus ===
Rank	Title	Name	Akson Lao	Took office	Left office	Duration
1	Chairperson of the Lao Women Parliamentarians	Thatsadaphone Saengsouliya	ທັດສະດາພອນ ແສງສຸລິຍາ	20 April 2016	22 March 2021	4 years and 336 days
2	Deputy Chairperson of the Lao Women Parliamentarians	Thavisai Phasathan	ທະວີໄສ ພະສະຖານ	20 April 2016	22 March 2021	4 years and 336 days

== Members ==
№	Constituency	Name	Akson Lao	7th NA	9th NA	Gender	National Assembly									LPRP
№	Constituency	Name	Akson Lao	7th NA	9th NA	Gender	STC	LAW	ETE	PFA	CSA	EAC	NDC	JUS	FOR	10th CC
1	Vientiane C.	Saysomphone Phomvihane	ໄຊສົມພອນ ພົມວິຫານ	Old	Reelected	Male	—	—	—	—	—	Member	—	—	—	Member
2	Vientiane C.	Thongsalith Mangnomek	ທອງສະລິດ ມັງໜໍ່ເມກ	New	Not	Male	—	Member	—	—	—	—	—	—	—	Member
3	Vientiane C.	Anouphab Tounalom	ອານຸພາບ ຕຸນາລົມ	New	Reelected	Male	—	—	—	Member	—	—	—	—	Member	Member
4	Vientiane C.	Khamfong Phoumvongxay	ຄຳຟອງ ພູມວົງໄຊ	Old	Not	Female	—	—	—	—	Member	—	—	—	—	—
5	Vientiane C.	Saithong Keoduangdy	ສາຍທອງ ແກ້ວດວງດີ	New	Not	Male	Member	Chair	—	—	—	—	—	—	—	—
6	Vientiane C.	Buakham Thipphavong	ນາງ ບົວຄຳ ທິບພະວົງ	New	Not	Female	Member	—	—	—	—	—	—	Chair.	—	—
7	Vientiane C.	Phonephet Boubpha	ພອນເພັດ ບຸບຜາ	New	Not	Female	—	—	—	—	D. Chair.	—	—	—	—	—
8	Vientiane C.	Phout Simmalavong	ພຸດ ສິມມາລາວົງ	New	Not	Male	—	—	—	—	—	Member	—	—	—	—
9	Vientiane C.	Linkham Duangsavanh	ລິນຄຳ ດວງສະຫວັນ	New	Reelected	Male	—	—	Member	—	—	—	—	—	—	—
10	Vientiane C.	Bounthong Phommachan	ບຸນທອງ ພົມມະຈັນ	New	Not	Male	—	—	—	—	—	Member	—	—	—	—
11	Vientiane C.	Buangen Hongkhaikham	ບົວເງິນ ຫົງໄຂຄຳ	New	Not	Male	—	—	—	—	—	—	Member	—	—	—
12	Vientiane C.	Ketmany Bandasack	ເກດມະນີ ບັນດາສັກ	New	Reelected	Female	—	—	—	—	Member	—	—	—	—	—
13	Vientiane C.	Buaket Phommachan	ບົວເກດ ພົມມະຈັນ	New	Not	Male	—	—	—	—	—	—	—	Member	—	—
14	Vientiane C.	Somchan Singthabouth	ສົມຈັນ ສິງທະບຸດ	New	Not	Female	—	—	—	—	—	—	—	—	—	—
15	Vientiane C.	Khampheuy Vongsakhamphoui	ຄຳເຜີຍ ວົງສາຄຳຜຸຍ	New	Not	Male	—	—	Member	—	—	—	—	—	—	—
16	Vientiane C.	Prachit Xayavong	ປຣະຈິດ ໄຊຍະວົງ	New	Not	Male	—	—	—	Member	—	—	—	—	—	—
17	Vientiane C.	Valy Vetsaphong	ວາລີ ເວດສະພົງ	New	Reelected	Female	—	—	—	Member	—	—	—	—	—	—
18	Phongsaly	Buathong Ousengkham	ບົວທອງ ອຸແສງຄຳ	New	Not	Male	—	—	Member	—	Member	—	—	—	—	—
19	Phongsaly	Chansy Saengsomphou	ຈັນສີ ແສງສົມພູ	Old	Not	Male	—	Member	—	—	—	—	—	—	Member	—
20	Phongsaly	Kongchi Yangchue	ກົງຈີ ຢາງຈື	New	Not	Male	—	Member	—	—	—	—	—	D. Chair.	—	—
21	Phongsaly	Khamsouk Bounyavong	ຄຳສຸກ ບຸນຍະວົງ	New	Not	Male	—	—	—	Member	—	—	—	—	—	—
22	Phongsaly	Chanpao Sulavong	ຈັນເປົ່າ ສຸລະວົງ	New	Not	Male	—	—	—	—	—	Member	Member	—	—	—
23	Luang Namtha	Somphanh Phengkhammy	ສົມພັນ ແພງຄຳມີ	Old	Not	Male	V. Pres.	Member	—	—	—	—	—	—	—	Member
24	Luang Namtha	Xayphon Khounsiliheuang	ໄຊພອນ ຄູນສີລິເຮືອງ	New	Not	Male	—	—	Member	Member	—	—	—	—	—	—
25	Luang Namtha	Kongphet Keobuapha	ກົງເພັດ ແກ້ວບົວພາ	Old	Reelected	Male	—	—	—	—	—	—	Member	Member	—	—
26	Luang Namtha	Khamlar Philatom	ຄຳຫລ້າ ພິລາຕອມ	New	Not	Male	—	—	—	—	Member	—	—	—	Member	—
27	Luang Namtha	Kesone Sengyavong	ນາງ ເກສອນ ແສງຍະວົງ	New	Reelected	Female	—	—	—	—	—	Member	—	—	—	—
28	Oudomxay	Pan Noymany	ປ້ານ ນ້ອຍມະນີ	New	Not	Male	—	—	—	—	—	—	—	—	Member	Member
29	Oudomxay	Bounlort Onphachan	ບຸນລອດ ອ່ອນພະຈັນ	Old	Not	Male	—	—	—	—	—	—	—	Member	—	—
30	Oudomxay	Somchanh Chitvongdeuan	ສົມຈັນ ຈິດວົງເດືອນ	Old	Not	Female	—	—	Member	—	Member	—	—	—	—	—
31	Oudomxay	Vongsavanh Xayavong	ວົງສະຫວັນ ໄຊຍະວົງ	New	Not	Male	—	Member	—	Member	—	—	—	—	—	—
32	Oudomxay	Khamphong Vichitchan	ຄຳຜອງ ວິຈິດ	New	Not	Male	—	—	—	—	—	—	Member	Member	—	—
33	Oudomxay	Khamphone Phimmachanh	ຄຳພອນ ພິມມະຈັນ	Old	Reelected	Female	—	—	—	—	—	Member	—	—	—	—
34	Oudomxay	Khamsaphone Xayavong	ຄຳສະພອນ ໄຊຍະວົງ	New	Not	Male	—	—	Member	—	—	—	—	—	—	—
35	Bokeo	Somlith Siphavanh	ສົມລິດ ສີຜາວັນ	New	Not	Male	—	—	—	—	Member	Member	—	—	—	—
36	Bokeo	Khamchomphou Silitham	ຄຳຈອມພູ ສິລິທຳ	Old	Not	Female	—	—	Member	Member	—	—	—	—	—	—
37	Bokeo	Bounphone Heuangmany	ບຸນພອນ ເຮືອງມະນີ	New	Not	Female	—	D. Chair	—	—	—	—	—	—	—	—
38	Bokeo	Khenthong Nuanthasing	ເຄນທອງ ນວນທະສິງ	New	Not	Male	—	—	—	—	—	—	—	—	D. Chair.	—
39	Bokeo	Houmpheng Inthachak	ຫຸມແພງ ອິນທະຈັກ	New	Reelected	Male	—	—	—	—	—	—	Member	Member	—	—
40	Luang Prabang	Pany Yathotou	ປານີ ຢາທໍ່ຕູ້	Old	Not	Female	Pres.	—	—	Member	—	—	—	—	—	Member
41	Luang Prabang	Saisamone Khomthavong	ສາຍສະໜອນ ຄົມທະວົງ	New	Not	Male	—	Member	—	—	—	—	Member	—	—	—
42	Luang Prabang	Bounsom Koummany	ບຸນສົມ ຄຸນມະນີ	New	Not	Male	—	—	—	—	Member	—	—	—	Member	—
43	Luang Prabang	Sinava Souphanouvong	ສີນາວາ ສຸພານຸວົງ	New	Reelected	Male	—	—	Member	—	—	—	—	—	—	—
44	Luang Prabang	Thongchan Manixay	ທອງຈັນ ມະນີໄຊ	New	Not	Male	—	—	—	—	—	Member	—	—	—	—
45	Luang Prabang	Khamphaeng Vilaphanh	ຄຳແພງ ວິລະພັນ	New	Reelected	Male	—	—	—	—	—	—	—	D. Chair.	—	—
46	Luang Prabang	Khamlar Lienpadith	ຄຳຫລ້າ ລຽນປະດິດ	New	Not	Male	—	—	—	—	—	Member	—	—	—	—
47	Luang Prabang	Paenkham Bouchanpheng	ແປ້ນຄຳ ບຸດຈັນເພັງ	New	Not	Male	—	—	—	—	—	—	Member	—	—	—
48	Luang Prabang	Vienvilay Dilaphanh	ວຽນວິໄລ ດີລະພັນ	Old	Reelected	Female	—	—	—	—	—	—	—	Member	—	—
49	Luang Prabang	Siriphone Souphanthong	ສິລິພອນ ສຸພັນທອງ	New	Not	Female	—	—	Member	Member	—	—	—	—	—	—
50	Xayaboury	Somlith Pueakkeo	ສົມລິດ ເປືອກແກ້ວ	New	Not	Male	—	Member	—	—	—	—	—	—	Member	—
51	Xayaboury	Idmany Chanthakhoun	ອິດມະນີ ຈັນທະຄູນ	Old	Not	Female	—	—	—	—	Member	Member	—	—	—	—
52	Xayaboury	Buaphan Leekaiya	ບົວພັນ ລີໄກຢາ	Old	Not	Female	Member	—	—	—	—	Chair.	—	—	—	—
53	Xayaboury	Khamsouk Vi-inthavong	ຄຳສຸກ ວີອິນທະວົງ	Old	Not	Male	Member	—	—	—	—	—	Chair.	—	—	—
54	Xayaboury	Chattava Keokhamphet	ຈັດຕະວາ ແກ້ວຄຳເພັດ	New	Reelected	Male	—	—	—	Member	—	—	—	—	—	—
55	Xayaboury	Phek Ondavong	ເພັກ ອ່ອນດາວົງ	New	Not	Male	—	—	—	—	—	—	—	Member	—	—
56	Xayaboury	Bounthai Sithep	ບຸນໄທ ສີເທບ	New	Not	Male	—	—	Member	—	—	—	—	—	—	—
57	Houaphanh	Alounxay Sounnalath	ອາລຸນໄຊ ສູນນະລາດ	New	Not	Male	—	Member	—	—	—	—	—	—	—	Substitute
58	Houaphanh	Khamvone Bounthavong	ຄຳວອນ ບຸນທະວົງ	Old	Not	Male	—	—	Member	—	—	Member	—	—	—	—
59	Houaphanh	Amphayvone Lombounphaeng	ອຳໄພວອນ ລ້ອມບຸນແພງ	Old	Reelected	Female	—	Member	—	—	—	—	—	Member	—	—
60	Houaphanh	Thanta Kongphaly	ທັນຕາ ກອງຜາລີ	New	Reelected	Male	—	—	—	D. Chair.	—	—	—	—	—	—
61	Houaphanh	Manivanh Yiapaoher	ມະນີວັນ ເຢຍປາວເຮີ	New	Reelected	Female	—	—	—	—	D. Chair.	—	—	—	—	—
62	Houaphanh	Suayphet Thongsombath	ສວຍເພັດ ທອງສົມບັດ	New	Reelected	Female	—	—	—	Member	Member	—	—	—	—	—
63	Houaphanh	Aen Oun-anongnud	ແອນ ອຸ່ນອານົງນຸດ	New	Not	Male	—	—	—	—	—	—	Member	—	Member	—
64	Xiangkhouang	Bounton Chanthaphone	ບຸນຕົ້ນ ຈັນທະພອນ	Old	Not	Male	—	Member	—	—	—	—	—	—	Member	—
65	Xiangkhouang	Sengkham Songsana	ແສງຄຳ ຊົ່ງຊະນະ	New	Not	Female	—	—	—	Member	Member	—	—	—	—	—
66	Xiangkhouang	Vanpheng Keonakhone	ວັນເພັງ ແກ້ວນະຄອນ	Old	Not	Female	—	—	—	—	—	D. Chair.	—	—	—	—
67	Xiangkhouang	Vanhthone Sonthavong	ວັນທອນ ສອນທະວົງ	New	Not	Male	—	—	—	—	—	—	Member	Member	—	—
68	Xiangkhouang	Vilaysouk Phimmasone	ວິໄລສຸກ ພິມມະສອນ	Old	Not	Male	—	—	Member	—	—	—	—	—	—	—
69	Xiangkhouang	Maysy Viengvilay	ໄມສີ ວຽງວິໄລ	New	Reelected	Male	—	—	Member	—	—	Member	—	—	—	—
70	Vientiane P.	Bounpheng Sainorlady	ບຸນເພັງ ສາຍນໍລະດີ	Old	Not	Male	—	—	—	—	—	—	—	Member	Member	—
71	Vientiane P.	Somdy Keodalavin	ສົມດີ ແກ້ວດາລາວິນ	Old	Not	Male	—	Member	Member	—	—	—	—	—	—	—
72	Vientiane P.	Somphou Douangsavanh	ສົມພູ ດວງສະຫວັນ	Old	Not	Male	Member	—	—	—	Chair.	—	—	—	—	—
73	Vientiane P.	Khamphang Kongchanseng	ຄຳຜາງ ກອງຈັນສີ	New	Not	Male	—	—	—	—	—	—	Member	—	—	—
74	Vientiane P.	Bouavanh Thammavong	ບົວວັນ ທຳມະວົງ	Old	Not	Female	—	—	—	—	Member	Member	—	—	—	—
75	Vientiane P.	Khambong Khonesavanh	ຄຳບົງ ຄອນສະຫວັນ	New	Not	Male	—	—	Member	—	—	—	—	—	—	—
76	Vientiane P.	Khamkhen Oudtama	ຄຳເຄນ ອຸດຕະມາ	Old	Not	Male	—	—	—	—	—	—	Member	—	—	—
77	Vientiane P.	Theongen Samonty	ແຖວເງິນ ຊາມົນຕີ	New	Not	Female	—	—	—	Member	—	—	—	—	—	—
78	Vientiane P.	Hongkham Souvannavong	ຫົງຄຳ ສຸວັນນະວົງ	New	Reelected	Male	—	—	—	Member	—	—	—	—	—	—
79	Bolikhamxay	Sisay Leudetmounsone	ສີໃສ ລືເດດມູນສອນ	New	Not	Female	V. Pres.	—	—	—	—	—	—	Member	—	Member
80	Bolikhamxay	Souvanhni Xaysana	ສຸວັນນີ ໄຊຊະນະ	New	Not	Male	—	—	—	Member	—	—	—	—	Member	—
81	Bolikhamxay	Sikhay Sipaseuth	ສີໄຄ ສີປະເສີດ	Old	Not	Female	—	—	Member	—	—	Member	—	—	—	—
82	Bolikhamxay	Lom Phengsouk	ລົມ ແພງສຸກ	New	Not	Male	—	—	—	—	Member	—	—	—	—	—
83	Bolikhamxay	Leeber Leebouapao	ລີເບີ ລີບົວປາວ	New	Reelected	Male	Member	Member	Member	Chair.	—	—	—	—	—	—
84	Bolikhamxay	Khamsai Phandanouvong	ສາຍຄຳ ພັນດານຸວົງ	New	Reelected	Male	—	—	—	—	—	—	Member	Member	—	—
85	Khammouane	Bounpone Bouttanavong	ບຸນປອນ ບຸດຕະນະວົງ	New	Not	Male	V. Pres.	—	Member	—	—	—	—	—	—	Member
86	Khammouane	Somchai Phetsinoun	ສົມໃຈ ເພັດສີນວນ	New	Not	Male	—	—	—	—	—	—	Member	—	—	—
87	Khammouane	Viengmany Chanthanasin	ວຽງມະນີ ຈັນທະນະສິນ	Old	Not	Female	—	—	—	—	Member	—	—	—	—	—
88	Khammouane	Bundith Phathoumvanh	ບັນດິດ ປະທຸມວັນ	New	Not	Female	—	—	—	—	—	—	—	—	Member	—
89	Khammouane	Thipphachan Phoxay	ທິບພະຈັນ ໂພໄຊ	Old	Not	Male	—	Member	—	—	—	—	—	Member	—	—
90	Khammouane	Aly Buachoum	ອາລີ ບົວຈູມ	New	Reelected	Female	—	—	—	—	—	Member	—	—	—	—
91	Khammouane	Khamphet Manivong	ຄຳເພັດ ມະນີວົງ	New	Not	Male	—	—	—	—	Member	—	—	—	—	—
92	Khammouane	Bounpan Douanglaty	ບຸນປັນ ດວງລາຕີ	Old	Not	Male	—	—	Member	Member	—	—	—	—	—	—
93	Savannakhet	Sengnouan Xayalath	ແສງນວນ ໄຊຍະລາດ	New	Not	Male	V. Pres.	—	—	—	—	Member	Member	—	—	Member
94	Savannakhet	Aeksavang Vongvichit	ເອກສະຫວ່າງ ວົງວິຈິດ	New	Not	Male	Member	—	—	—	—	—	—	—	Chair.	—
95	Savannakhet	Khampheuy Phanthachone	ຄຳເຜີຍ ຜັນນທະຈອນ	New	Not	Male	—	—	Member	—	—	—	—	—	Member	—
96	Savannakhet	Khamphanh Khounsavanh	ຄໍາຜັນ ຄູນສະຫວັນ	New	Reelected	Male	—	—	—	Member	—	—	—	—	—	—
97	Savannakhet	Souvanpheng Bouphanouvong	ສຸວັນເພັງ ບຸບຜານຸວົງ	Old	Not	Female	—	—	Member	—	—	—	—	—	—	—
98	Savannakhet	Bounkhouang Khambounheuang	ບຸນຂວາງ ຄຳບຸນເຮືອງ	New	Not	Male	—	Member	—	—	—	—	—	—	—	—
99	Savannakhet	Chansone Saenboudtalath	ຈັນສອນ ແສນບຸດຕະລາດ	New	Not	Male	—	—	—	Member	—	—	—	—	—	—
100	Savannakhet	Ketkeo Sihalath	ເກດແກ້ວ ສີຫາລາດ	Old	Reelected	Male	—	—	—	D. Chair.	—	—	—	—	—	—
101	Savannakhet	Sanya Praseuth	ສັນຍາ ປະເສີດ	New	Reelected	Male	—	—	D. Chair.	—	—	—	—	—	—	—
102	Savannakhet	Viengthavisone Thepphachan	ວຽງທະວີສອນ ເທບພະຈັັັັັນ	New	Not	Male	—	—	—	—	—	—	—	—	Member	—
103	Savannakhet	Somphet Inthathilath	ສົມເພັດ ອິນທະທິລາດ	Old	Not	Male	—	Member	—	—	—	—	—	—	—	—
104	Savannakhet	Bountem Xouangsayavong	ບຸນເຕັມ ຊ່ວງສາຍະວົງ	Old	Not	Male	—	—	—	—	Member	Member	—	—	—	—
105	Savannakhet	Vankham Inthichack	ຫວັນຄຳ ອິນທິຈັກ	Old	Not	Male	—	—	—	—	—	—	—	Member	—	—
106	Savannakhet	Somphone Sitthisombath	ສົມພອນ ສິດທິສົມບັດ	New	Not	Male	—	—	—	—	—	—	Member	—	—	—
107	Savannakhet	Khampheng Vilaythong	ຄຳເພັງ ວິໄລທອງ	New	Not	Female	—	—	—	—	—	—	—	Member	—	—
108	Savannakhet	Ainhom Chansyna	ອິນໂຮມ ຈັນສີນາ	New	Not	Male	—	—	—	—	—	—	Member	—	—	—
109	Savannakhet	Phavanh Bualuanglath	ພາວັນ ບົວຫລວງລາດ	New	Not	Female	—	—	—	Member	—	—	—	—	—	—
110	Savannakhet	Saysomseun Phothisan	ໃສຊົມຊື່ນ ໂພທິສານ	New	Reelected	Female	—	—	—	—	—	Member	—	—	—	—
111	Savannakhet	Souksavanh Xaysombath	ສຸກສະຫວັນ ໄຊສົມບັດ	New	Reelected	Male	—	—	—	—	Member	—	—	—	—	—
112	Saravan	Suanesavanh Vignaket	ສວນສະຫວັນ ວິຍະເກດ	Old	Not	Female	Member	—	—	—	—	—	—	—	Member	Substitute
113	Saravan	Somlet Chounlamany	ສົມເລັດ ຈຸນລະມະນີ	New	Not	Male	—	Member	—	—	—	Member	—	—	—	—
114	Saravan	Thongdi Chanthavong	ທອງດີ ຈັນທະວົງ	New	Not	Male	—	—	Member	Member	—	—	—	—	—	—
115	Saravan	Bounpone Sisoulath	ບຸນປອນ ສີສຸລາດ	Old	Not	Male	Member	—	Chair.	—	—	—	—	—	—	—
116	Saravan	Savanhkhone Lasamonti	ສະຫວັນຄອນ ລາຊະມົນຕີ	New	Not	Male	—	—	—	—	Member	—	—	—	—	—
117	Saravan	Bounthiem Phommasathith	ບຸນທຽມ ພົມມະສະຖິດ	Old	Not	Male	—	Member	—	—	—	—	—	—	—	—
118	Saravan	Sounthai Xayaseng	ສູນໄຖ ໄຊຍະແສງ	New	Not	Female	—	—	—	—	Member	—	—	Member	—	—
119	Saravan	Saysamone Inthisene	ສາຍສະໜອນ ອິນທິເສນ	New	Reelected	Male	—	—	—	—	—	—	Member	—	—	—
120	Champasak	Baykham Khattiya	ໃບຄຳ ຂັດຕິຍະ	New	Not	Female	—	—	—	—	—	Member	—	—	—	Substitute
121	Champasak	Meksavanh Phomphithak	ເມກສະຫວັນ ພົມພິທັກ	Old	Not	Male	—	—	—	—	—	—	Member	—	—	—
122	Champasak	Khamsi Piengvorlavong	ຄຳສີ ປ່ຽງວໍລະວົງ	New	Not	Male	—	—	Member	—	—	—	—	—	Member	—
123	Champasak	Phongsane Nyutitham	ພົງສະເໜ່ ຍຸຕິທຳ	New	Not	Male	—	—	—	—	—	Member	—	—	—	—
124	Champasak	Soubanh Savabouth	ສຸບັນ ສະວະບຸດ	New	Reelected	Male	—	Member	—	—	—	—	—	—	—	—
125	Champasak	Pingkham Lasasimma	ປິ່ງຄຳ ລາຊະສິມມາ	Old	Reelected	Female	—	—	D. Chair.	—	—	—	—	—	—	—
126	Champasak	Thatsadaphone Saengsouliya	ທັດສະດາພອນ ແສງສຸລິຍາ	Old	Not	Female	—	—	—	—	Member	—	—	—	—	—
127	Champasak	Thavisai Phasathan	ທະວີໄສ ພະສະຖານ	New	Not	Female	—	—	—	—	—	—	—	—	Member	—
128	Champasak	Somxay Sihachak	ສົມໄຊ ສີຫາຈັກ	New	Reelected	Male	—	Member	—	—	—	—	—	Member	—	—
129	Champasak	Souksavanh Vilayvong	ສຸກສະຫວັນ ວິໄລວົງ	New	Not	Male	—	—	Member	Member	—	—	—	—	—	—
130	Champasak	Saithong Xayavong	ສາຍທອງ ໄຊຍະວົງ	New	Reelected	Male	—	—	—	Member	—	—	—	—	—	—
131	Champasak	Sengsuvan Suyphasith	ແສງສຸວັນ ຊຸຍພະສິດ	New	Not	Female	—	—	—	—	Member	—	—	—	—	—
132	Champasak	Manivong Saenlath	ມະນີວົງ ແສນລາດ	New	Reelected	Male	—	—	—	—	—	Member	—	—	—	—
133	Champasak	Khamtay Keoduangdy	ຄຳໄຕ ແກ້ວດວງດີ	New	Reelected	Male	—	—	—	Member	—	—	—	—	—	—
134	Sekong	Vilaivong Boutdakham	ວິໄລວົງ ບຸດດາຄຳ	New	Not	Male	—	—	—	—	—	—	—	—	—	—
135	Sekong	Phonephet Khiewlavong	ພອນເພັດ ຄິວລາວົງ	New	Not	Male	—	—	—	Member	—	—	Member	—	—	—
136	Sekong	Dongphet Phayon	ດົງເພັດ ພະຍົນ	New	Reelected	Male	—	—	Member	—	—	—	—	Member	—	—
137	Sekong	Amphay Chitmanon	ອຳໄພ ຈິດມານົນ	New	Reelected	Male	—	D. Chair	—	—	—	—	—	—	Member	—
138	Sekong	Haymany Vongnorkeo	ໄຮມະນີ ວົງໜໍ່ແກ້ວ	Old	Reelected	Female	—	—	—	—	Member	Member	—	—	—	—
139	Attapeu	Let Xayaphone	ເລັດ ໄຊຍະພອນ	New	Not	Male	—	Member	—	Member	—	—	—	—	—	—
140	Attapeu	Phetkeo Heuangpanya	ເພັດແກ້ວ ເຮືອງປັນຍາ	Old	Not	Male	—	—	—	—	—	—	Member	—	Member	—
141	Attapeu	Phonmany Khienxayavong	ພອນມະນີ ຂຽນໄຊຍະວົງ	Old	Not	Female	—	—	—	—	Member	Member	—	—	—	—
142	Attapeu	Maniso Xamounty	ມະນີໂສ ຊາມຸນຕີ	New	Reelected	Male	—	—	D. Chair.	—	—	—	—	—	—	—
143	Attapeu	Bualaphan Vongsalasith	ບົວລະພັນ ວົງຊາລະຊິດ	New	Not	Male	—	Member	—	—	—	—	—	Member	—	—
144	Xaysomboun	Bounsouk Chomvisan	ບຸນສຸກ ຈອມວິສານ	New	Not	Male	—	—	—	—	Member	Member	—	—	—	—
145	Xaysomboun	Khamdeng Silavong	ຄຳແດງ ສີລາວົງ	Old	Not	Male	—	—	Member	Member	—	—	—	—	—	—
146	Xaysomboun	Khamchanh Sotapaseuth	ຄຳຈັນ ໂສຕາປະເສີດ	New	Reelected	Male	—	—	—	—	—	D. Chair.	—	—	Member	—
147	Xaysomboun	Poumi Vandixay	ພົຈວ ພູມມີ ວັນດີໄຊ	New	Not	Male	—	Member	—	—	—	—	D. Chair.	—	—	—
148	Xaysomboun	Vixaythor Phialuangchongser	ວິໄຊທໍ່ ເພຍຫຼວງຈົ່ງເສີ	New	Reelected	Male	—	—	—	—	—	—	D. Chair.	Member	—	—
