= 9th National Assembly of Laos =

Assembly elected on 21 February 2021

9th National Assembly

22 March 2021 – (4 years, 226 days) Overview
- Type: Session of the National Assembly of Laos
- Election: 21 February 2021

Leadership
- President: Saysomphone Phomvihane
- Vice President: Sounthone Xayachack; Chaleun Yiapaoher; Khambay Damlath; Sommad Pholsena; Souvone Leuangbounmy

Members
- Total: 164

The 9th National Assembly of Laos was elected by a popular vote on 21 February 2021 to replace the 8th National Assembly. It convened its 1st Ordinary Session on 22 March 2021. Saysomphone Phomvihane was elected, replacing Pany Yathotou.

== Meetings ==
Meeting	Start–end	Length	Session agenda
1st Ordinary Session	22–26 March 2021	5 days	10 items: 1. Work report by Bounnhang Vorachit, the President of Laos; 1. approved.; 2. Work report by Prime Minister of Laos Thongloun Sisoulith, known as "Implementation of the 8th Five-Year National Socio-Economic Development Plan"; 1. approved.; 3. Sisoulith on behalf of the 8th Government of Laos proposed the 9th Five-Year National Socio-Economic Development Plan; 1. approved.; 4. Work report by Pany Yathotou, the President of the National Assembly of Laos, on behalf of the 8th National Assembly of Laos and its 8th Standing Committee; 1. approved.; 5. Pany Yathotou proposes on behalf of the 8th Standing Committee the Five-Year Plan on Law-making and Amendments (2021–2025); 1. approved.; 6. Work Report by the 8th State Audit Organisation and five-year plan proposal for the 9th tern; 1. approved.; 7. Work Report by the 8th State Inspection Authority and five-year plan proposal for the 9th tern; 1. approved.; 8. Work Report by the 8th People's Supreme Court and five-year plan proposal for the 9th tern; 1. approved.; 9. Work Report by the Supreme People's Prosecutor and five-year plan proposal for the 9th tern; 1. approved.; 10. Elections and government reorganisation.; 1. Election of the President of the National Assembly of Laos; 1. Saysomphone Phomvihane is elected for a second term.; 2. Election of officers as Vice President of the National Assembly of Laos; 1. Sounthone Xayachack, Chaleun Yiapaoher, Khambay Damlath, Sommad Pholsena and Souvone Leuangbounmy were elected; 3. Election of the 9th Presidency of the Lao PDR.; 1. Election of the President of Laos; 1. Thongloun Sisoulith is elected.; 2. Election of the Vice President of Laos; 1. Pany Yathotou and Bounthong Chitmany were elected.; 4. Election of the 9th Government of Laos; 1. Thongloun Sisoulith recommends that Phankham Viphavanh should be elected as Prime Minister of Laos; 1. recommendation approved.; 2. Election of officials as Deputy Prime Minister of Laos; 1. Chansamone Chanyalath, Sonexay Siphandone and Kikeo Khaykhamphithoune were elected.; 5. Abolishing of the Ministry of Science and Technology and transferring of responsibilities to the Ministry of Education and Sports, Ministry of Post and Telecommunications, Ministry of Industry and Commerce, Ministry of Agriculture and Forestry and the Ministry of Energy and Mines; 6. On the Government Inspection Authority.; 1. To make the Government Inspection Authority independent of the government; 1. approved.; 2. To change its name to "State Inspection Authority"; 3. Approved.; 4. Election of remaining ministers of the 9th Government; 1. elected.; 7. Election of the 9th control and judiciary organs of Laos; 1. Election of the President of the State Audit Organisation; 1. Malaythong Kommasith is elected.; 2. Election of the President of the State Inspection Authority; 1. Khamphan Phommathat is elected.; 3. Election of the President and Head of Office of the Supreme People's Prosecutor; 1. Xaysana Khotphouthone is elected.; 4. Election of the President of the People's Supreme Court; 1. Viengthong Siphandone is elected.

== Officers ==
=== Presidency ===
Rank	Title	Name	Akson Lao	Took office	Left office	Duration
1	President of the National Assembly of Laos	Saysomphone Phomvihane	ໄຊສົມພອນ ພົມວິຫານ	22 March 2021	Incumbent	4 years and 226 days
2	Vice President of the National Assembly of Laos	Sounthone Xayachack	ສູນທອນ ໄຊຍະຈັກ	22 March 2021	Incumbent	4 years and 226 days
3	Vice President of the National Assembly of Laos	Chaleun Yiapaoher	ຈະເລີນ ເຢຍປາວເຮີ	22 March 2021	Incumbent	4 years and 226 days
4	Vice President of the National Assembly of Laos	Khambay Damlath	ຄໍາໃບ ດໍາລັດ	22 March 2021	Incumbent	4 years and 226 days
5	Vice President of the National Assembly of Laos	Sommad Pholsena	ສົມມາດ ພົນເສນາ	22 March 2021	Incumbent	4 years and 226 days
6	Vice President of the National Assembly of Laos	Souvone Leuangbounmy	ສຸວອນ ເລືອງບຸນມີ	22 March 2021	Incumbent	4 years and 226 days

=== Secretariat ===
Rank	Title	Name	Akson Lao	Took office	Left office	Duration
1	Secretary-General of the National Assembly of Laos	Pingkham Lasasimma	ປິ່ງຄຳ ລາຊະສິມມາ	22 March 2021	Incumbent	4 years and 226 days
2	Deputy Secretary-General of the National Assembly of Laos	TBD	TBD	22 March 2021	Incumbent	4 years and 226 days
3	Deputy Secretary-General of the National Assembly of Laos	TBD	TBD	22 March 2021	Incumbent	4 years and 226 days

=== Women Caucus ===
Rank	Title	Name	Akson Lao	Took office	Left office	Duration
1	Chairperson of the Lao Women Parliamentarians	TBD	TBD	22 March 2021	Incumbent	4 years and 226 days
2	Deputy Chairperson of the Lao Women Parliamentarians	TBD	TBD	22 March 2021	Incumbent	4 years and 226 days

== Members ==
№	Constituency	Name	Akson Lao	8th NA	Gender	National Assembly									LPRP
№	Constituency	Name	Akson Lao	8th NA	Gender	STC	CSA	EAC	ETE	FOR	JUS	LAW	NDC	PFA	11th CC
1	Vientiane C.	Saysomphone Phomvihane	ໄຊສົມພອນ ພົມວິຫານ	Old	Male	—	—	—	—	—	—	—	—	—	Member
2	Vientiane C.	Anouphab Tounalom	ອານຸພາບ ຕຸນາລົມ	Old	Male	—	—	—	—	—	—	—	—	—	Member
3	Vientiane C.	Linkham Duangsavanh	ລິນຄຳ ດວງສະຫວັນ	Old	Male	—	—	—	—	—	—	—	—	—	Substitute
4	Vientiane C.	Bounta Thepphavong	ບຸນຕາ ເທບພະວົງ	New	Male	—	—	—	—	—	—	—	—	—	Substitute
5	Vientiane C.	Ketkeo Sihalath	ເກດແກ້ວ ສີຫາລາດ	Old	Male	—	—	—	—	—	—	—	—	—	—
6	Vientiane C.	Xaykham Ounmixay	ໄຊຄໍາ ອຸ່ນມີໄຊ	New	Male	—	—	—	—	—	—	—	—	—	—
7	Vientiane C.	Viengvilay Thiengchanxay	ວຽງວິໄລ ທ່ຽງຈັນໄຊ	New	Male	—	—	—	—	—	—	—	—	—	—
8	Vientiane C.	Bountham Phoutthavongsa	ບຸນທາມ ພຸດທະວົງສາ	New	Male	—	—	—	—	—	—	—	—	—	—
9	Vientiane C.	Ketmany Bandasack	ເກດມະນີ ບັນດາສັກ	Old	Female	—	—	—	—	—	—	—	—	—	—
10	Vientiane C.	Valy Vetsaphong	ວາລີ ເວດສະພົງ	Old	Female	—	—	—	—	—	—	—	—	—	—
11	Vientiane C.	Somphien Vongxay	ສົມພຽນ ວົງໄຊ	New	Female	—	—	—	—	—	—	—	—	—	—
12	Vientiane C.	Vixay Srithirath	ວົງໄຊ ສຣິດທິຣາດ	New	Female	—	—	—	—	—	—	—	—	—	—
13	Vientiane C.	Chanthala Oudomsouk	ຈັນທະລາ ອຸດົມສຸກ	New	Male	—	—	—	—	—	—	—	—	—	—
14	Vientiane C.	Thongsavanh Miboun	ທອງສະ ຫວັນ ມີບຸນ	New	Male	—	—	—	—	—	—	—	—	—	—
15	Vientiane C.	Khamphong Sengsavang	ຄໍາຜ່ອງ ແສງສະຫວ່າງ	New	Male	—	—	—	—	—	—	—	—	—	—
16	Vientiane C.	Aengphone Phaengsouvanh	ແອງພອນ ແພງສຸວັນ	New	Male	—	—	—	—	—	—	—	—	—	—
17	Vientiane C.	Sompaseuth Sihalath	ນາງສົມປະເສີດ ສີຫາລາດ	New	Female	—	—	—	—	—	—	—	—	—	—
18	Vientiane C.	Thanongsith Meuangchanh	ທະນົງສິດ ເມືອງຈັນ	New	Male	—	—	—	—	—	—	—	—	—	—
19	Phongsaly	Thongsy Saosouliphom	ທອງສີ ເສົາສຸລິພົມ	New	Male	—	—	—	—	—	—	—	—	—	—
20	Phongsaly	Khammuan Xomsihapanya	ຄໍາມ່ວນ ຊົມສີຫາປັນຍາ	New	Male	—	—	—	—	—	—	—	—	—	—
21	Phongsaly	Somchit Hablakone	ສົມຈິດ ຫັບລາກອນ	New	Male	—	—	—	—	—	—	—	—	—	—
22	Phongsaly	Sisounthone Sorphabmixay	ສີສູນທອນ ຜາບມີໄຊ	New	Male	—	—	—	—	—	—	—	—	—	—
23	Phongsaly	Chanmany Duangphasouk	ນາງຈັນມະນີ ດວງຜາສຸກ	New	Female	—	—	—	—	—	—	—	—	—	—
24	Phongsaly	Oukham Toulaphanh	ອູ່ຄໍາ ຕຸລາພັນ	New	Male	—	—	—	—	—	—	—	—	—	—
25	Luang Namtha	Khamfong Inmany	ຄໍາຟອງ ອິນມານີ	New	Male	—	—	—	—	—	—	—	—	—	—
26	Luang Namtha	Vongsack Phanthavong	ວົງສັກ ພັນທະວົງ	New	Male	—	—	—	—	—	—	—	—	—	—
27	Luang Namtha	Vanthone Soulisack	ວັນທອນ ສຸລິສັກ	New	Male	—	—	—	—	—	—	—	—	—	—
28	Luang Namtha	Kongphet Keobuapha	ກົງເພັດ ແກ້ວບົວພາ	Old	Male	—	—	—	—	—	—	—	—	—	—
29	Luang Namtha	Kesone Sengyavong	ເກສອນ ແສງຍະວົງ	Old	Female	—	—	—	—	—	—	—	—	—	—
30	Luang Namtha	Chanthasoulin Manpadith	ຈັນທະສຸລິນ ໝັ້ນປະດິດ	New	Male	—	—	—	—	—	—	—	—	—	—
31	Oudomxay	Khamdy Vonglorm	ຄໍາດີ ວົງລ້ອມ	New	Male	—	—	—	—	—	—	—	—	—	—
32	Oudomxay	Khamchanh Sotapaseuth	ຄຳຈັນ ໂສຕາປະເສີດ	Old	Male	—	—	—	—	—	—	—	—	—	—
33	Oudomxay	Khamphone Phimmachanh	ຄຳພອນ ພິມມະຈັນ	Old	Female	—	—	—	—	—	—	—	—	—	—
34	Oudomxay	Leuam Somsivilay	ເລື່ອນ ສົມສີວິໄລ	New	Male	—	—	—	—	—	—	—	—	—	—
35	Oudomxay	Nisith Keopanya	ນິສິດ ແກ້ວປັນຍາ	New	Male	—	—	—	—	—	—	—	—	—	—
36	Oudomxay	Sonvilay Toulathong	ສອນວິໄລ ຕຸລາທອງ	New	Male	—	—	—	—	—	—	—	—	—	—
37	Oudomxay	Khammany Xayduangta	ຄໍາມະນີ ໄຊດວງຕາ	New	Male	—	—	—	—	—	—	—	—	—	—
38	Bokeo	Chomsy Lattanapan	ຈອມສີ ລັດຕະນະປັນ	New	Male	—	—	—	—	—	—	—	—	—	—
39	Bokeo	Thoummaly Vongphachanh	ທຸມມາລີ ວົງພະຈັນ	New	Female	—	—	—	—	—	—	—	—	—	—
40	Bokeo	Houmphaeng Inthachak	ຫຸມແພງ ອິນທະຈັກ	Old	Male	—	—	—	—	—	—	—	—	—	—
41	Bokeo	Vilaphanh Silitham	ວິລະພັນ ສີລິທໍາ	New	Male	—	—	—	—	—	—	—	—	—	—
42	Bokeo	Buakhom Khansouvong	ບົວຄົມ ຂານສຸວົງ	New	Female	—	—	—	—	—	—	—	—	—	—
43	Bokeo	Nengsida Bialeumua	ເນັ່ງສີດາ ເບຼຍລືມົວ	New	Male	—	—	—	—	—	—	—	—	—	—
44	Luang Prabang	Vongsavanh Thepphachanh	ວົງສະຫວັນ ເທບພະຈັນ	New	Male	—	—	—	—	—	—	—	—	—	—
45	Luang Prabang	Sinava Souphanouvong	ສີນາວາ ສຸພານຸວົງ	Old	Male	—	—	—	—	—	—	—	—	—	—
46	Luang Prabang	Manivanh Yiapaoher	ມະນີວັນ ເຢຍປາວເຮີ	Old	Female	—	—	—	—	—	—	—	—	—	—
47	Luang Prabang	Vienvilay Dilaphanh	ວຽນວິໄລ ດີລະພັນ	Old	Female	—	—	—	—	—	—	—	—	—	—
48	Luang Prabang	Vandy Boutthasavong	ວັນດີ ບຸດທະສະວົງ	New	Female	—	—	—	—	—	—	—	—	—	—
49	Luang Prabang	Korlakan Phommavong	ກໍລະກັນ ພົມມະວົງ	New	Male	—	—	—	—	—	—	—	—	—	—
50	Luang Prabang	Somphone Sioudomphanh	ສົມພອນ ສີອຸດົມພັນ	New	Male	—	—	—	—	—	—	—	—	—	—
51	Luang Prabang	Sommaly Khamkeng	ສົມມາລີ ຄໍາເກັ່ງ	New	Male	—	—	—	—	—	—	—	—	—	—
52	Luang Prabang	Vongphet Oudomlith	ວົງເພັດ ອຸດົມລິດ	New	Male	—	—	—	—	—	—	—	—	—	—
53	Luang Prabang	Sivixay Phengsantisouk	ສີວິໄຊ ເພັງສັນຕິ	New	Male	—	—	—	—	—	—	—	—	—	—
54	Xayaboury	Souvone Leuangbounmy	ສຸວອນ ເລືອງບຸນມີ	New	Male	—	—	—	—	—	—	—	—	—	Member
55	Xayaboury	Leeber Leebouapao	ລີເບີ ລີບົວປາວ	Old	Male	—	—	—	—	—	—	—	—	—	Member
56	Xayaboury	Phengnilan Khamphanpheng	ເພັງນິລັນ ຄໍາພັນເພັງ	New	Male	—	—	—	—	—	—	—	—	—	—
57	Xayaboury	Bounta Onnavong	ບຸນຕາ ອ່ອນດາວົງ	New	Male	—	—	—	—	—	—	—	—	—	—
58	Xayaboury	Bounlom Keobuahome	ບຸນລ້ອມ ແກ້ວບົວໂຮມ	New	Male	—	—	—	—	—	—	—	—	—	—
59	Xayaboury	Bounluan Xomsihapanya	ບຸນລ້ວນ ຊົມສີຫາປັນຍາ	New	Male	—	—	—	—	—	—	—	—	—	—
60	Xayaboury	Chattava Keokhamphet	ຈັດຕະວາ ແກ້ວຄຳເພັດ	Old	Male	—	—	—	—	—	—	—	—	—	—
61	Xayaboury	Somana Pinthip	ສົມມະນາ ປິ່ນທິບ	New	Male	—	—	—	—	—	—	—	—	—	—
62	Xayaboury	Vanna Phomvisone	ວັນນາ ພົມວິສອນ	New	Female	—	—	—	—	—	—	—	—	—	—
63	Houaphanh	Amphayvone Lombounphaeng	ອຳໄພວອນ ລ້ອມບຸນແພງ	Old	Female	—	—	—	—	—	—	—	—	—	—
64	Houaphanh	Khamphaeng Vilaphanh	ຄຳແພງ ວິລະພັນ	Old	Male	—	—	—	—	—	—	—	—	—	—
65	Houaphanh	Khonpaphanh Leuangsichanthong	ຄອນປະພັນ ເລືອງສີຈັນທອງ	New	Male	—	—	—	—	—	—	—	—	—	—
66	Houaphanh	Keochaleun Xiayingyang	ແກ້ວຈະເລີນ ເຊ່ຍຢິງຢ່າງ	New	Male	—	—	—	—	—	—	—	—	—	—
67	Houaphanh	Sathabandith Insixiengmay	ສະຖາບັນດິດ ອິນສີຊຽງໃໝ່	New	Male	—	—	—	—	—	—	—	—	—	—
68	Houaphanh	Sikham Bounmixay	ສີຄໍາ ບຸນມີໄຊ	New	Male	—	—	—	—	—	—	—	—	—	—
69	Houaphanh	Suayphet Thongsombath	ສວຍເພັດ ທອງສົມບັດ	Old	Female	—	—	—	—	—	—	—	—	—	—
70	Xiangkhouang	Bounhome Thetthany	ບຸນໂຮມ ເທດທານີ	New	Male	—	—	—	—	—	—	—	—	—	—
71	Xiangkhouang	Viengxay Sivilay	ວຽງໄຊ ສີວິໄລ	New	Male	—	—	—	—	—	—	—	—	—	—
72	Xiangkhouang	Viengkeo Vannachak	ວຽງແກ້ວ ວັນນະຈັກ	New	Male	—	—	—	—	—	—	—	—	—	—
73	Xiangkhouang	Maysy Viengvilay	ໄມສີ ວຽງວິໄລ	Old	Male	—	—	—	—	—	—	—	—	—	—
74	Xiangkhouang	Khamphaeng Thammavone	ຄໍາແພງ ທໍາມະວອນ	New	Male	—	—	—	—	—	—	—	—	—	—
75	Xiangkhouang	Khamsene Sisavong	ຄໍາແສນ ສິສະວົງ	New	Male	—	—	—	—	—	—	—	—	—	—
76	Xiangkhouang	Sotthida Thipmountaly	ສົດທິດາ ທິບມຸນຕາລີ	New	Female	—	—	—	—	—	—	—	—	—	—
77	Vientiane P.	Chaleun Yiapaoher	ຈະເລີນ ເຢຍປາວເຮີ	New	Male	—	—	—	—	—	—	—	—	—	Member
78	Vientiane P.	Bounsone Phetlavanh	ບຸນສອນ ເພັດລາວັນ	New	Male	—	—	—	—	—	—	—	—	—	—
79	Vientiane P.	Lammay Koutlavong	ລໍາໄມ ກຸດລາວົງ	New	Male	—	—	—	—	—	—	—	—	—	—
80	Vientiane P.	Phouthone Vorlaphet	ພູທອນ ວິລະເພັດ	New	Male	—	—	—	—	—	—	—	—	—	—
81	Vientiane P.	Buakham Luang-aphay	ບົວຄໍາ ຫຼວງອາໄພ	New	Male	—	—	—	—	—	—	—	—	—	—
82	Vientiane P.	Khanphet Bountam	ຂັນເຮັດ ບຸນຕໍ່າ	New	Male	—	—	—	—	—	—	—	—	—	—
83	Vientiane P.	Hongkham Souvannavong	ຫົງຄຳ ສຸວັນນະວົງ	Old	Male	—	—	—	—	—	—	—	—	—	—
84	Vientiane P.	Malaysy Thammakhot	ມະໄລສີ ທໍາມະໂຄດ	New	Female	—	—	—	—	—	—	—	—	—	—
85	Vientiane P.	Bounnam Chanthongsy	ບຸນນໍາ ຈັນທອງສີ	New	Male	—	—	—	—	—	—	—	—	—	—
86	Vientiane P.	Inpone Maniseng	ອິນປອນ ມະນີແສງ	New	Male	—	—	—	—	—	—	—	—	—	—
87	Bolikhamxay	Pingkham Lasasimma	ປິ່ງຄຳ ລາຊະສິມມາ	Old	Female	—	—	—	—	—	—	—	—	—	Member
88	Bolikhamxay	Souvanny Xayxana	ສຸວັນນີ ໄຊຊະນະ	New	Male	—	—	—	—	—	—	—	—	—	—
89	Bolikhamxay	Leuanvilay Chanthalaphanh	ລື່ອນວິໄລ ຈັນທະລາພັນ	New	Male	—	—	—	—	—	—	—	—	—	—
90	Bolikhamxay	Khamsai Phandanouvong	ຄໍາສາຍ ພັນດານຸວົງ	Old	Male	—	—	—	—	—	—	—	—	—	—
91	Bolikhamxay	Nouphanh Oudsa	ໜູພັນ ອຸດສາ	New	Male	—	—	—	—	—	—	—	—	—	—
92	Bolikhamxay	Khanthong Phanthachak	ຂັນທອງ ພັນທະຈັກ	New	Female	—	—	—	—	—	—	—	—	—	—
93	Bolikhamxay	Oudom Vongkaysone	ວົງໄກສອນ ຮັກສາການ	New	Male	—	—	—	—	—	—	—	—	—	—
94	Khammouane	Khambay Damlath	ຄໍາໃບ ດໍາລັດ	New	Male	—	—	—	—	—	—	—	—	—	Member
95	Khammouane	Bounmy Phimmasone	ບຸນມີ ພິມມະສອນ	New	Male	—	—	—	—	—	—	—	—	—	—
96	Khammouane	Xaynakhone Inthavong	ໄຊນະຄອນ ອິນທະວົງ	New	Male	—	—	—	—	—	—	—	—	—	—
97	Khammouane	Bang-on Xayasith	ບັງອອນ ໄຊຍະສິດ	New	Female	—	—	—	—	—	—	—	—	—	—
98	Khammouane	Maifong Maixai	ມາຍຟອງ ມາຍຊາຍ	New	Male	—	—	—	—	—	—	—	—	—	—
99	Khammouane	Tosern Outthatsy	ໂຕເຊີນ ອຸດທັດສີ	New	Male	—	—	—	—	—	—	—	—	—	—
100	Khammouane	Thanongsinh Kanlaya	ທະນົງສິນ ກັນລະຍາ	New	Male	—	—	—	—	—	—	—	—	—	—
101	Khammouane	Aly Buachoum	ອາລີ ບົວຈູມ	Old	Female	—	—	—	—	—	—	—	—	—	—
102	Khammouane	Saleumsack Keochanthala	ສະເຫຼີມສັກ ແກ້ວຈັນທະລາ	New	Male	—	—	—	—	—	—	—	—	—	—
103	Savannakhet	Sounthone Xayachack	ສູນທອນ ໄຊຍະຈັກ	New	Female	—	—	—	—	—	—	—	—	—	Member
104	Savannakhet	Kongkeo Mivorachak	ກົງແກ້ວ ມີວໍລະຈັກ	New	Male	—	—	—	—	—	—	—	—	—	—
105	Savannakhet	Khamphanh Khounsavanh	ຄໍາຜັນ ຄູນສະຫວັນ	Old	Male	—	—	—	—	—	—	—	—	—	—
106	Savannakhet	Chanthavong Saen-amatmounty	ຈັນທະວົງ ແສນອາມາດມົນຕີ	New	Male	—	—	—	—	—	—	—	—	—	—
107	Savannakhet	Phonsane Vilaymeng	ພອນສານ ວິໄລເມັ້ງ	New	Male	—	—	—	—	—	—	—	—	—	—
108	Savannakhet	Sanya Praseuth	ສັນຍາ ປະເສີດ	Old	Male	—	—	—	—	—	—	—	—	—	—
109	Savannakhet	Mala Vilachit	ມາລາ ວິລະຈິດ	New	Male	—	—	—	—	—	—	—	—	—	—
110	Savannakhet	Savaeng Nanthavong	ສະແຫວງ ນັນທະວົງ	New	Male	—	—	—	—	—	—	—	—	—	—
111	Savannakhet	Thongsay Inthisaeng	ທອງໄສ ອິນທິແສງ	New	Male	—	—	—	—	—	—	—	—	—	—
112	Savannakhet	Buakhay Phengphachanh	ບົວໄຂ ເພັງພະຈັນ	New	Female	—	—	—	—	—	—	—	—	—	—
113	Savannakhet	Khounsamay Linsanya	ຄູນສະໄໝ ລິນສັນຍາ	New	Male	—	—	—	—	—	—	—	—	—	—
114	Savannakhet	Xayadeth Phouiyavong	ໄຊຍະເດດ ຜຸຍຍະວົງ	New	Male	—	—	—	—	—	—	—	—	—	—
115	Savannakhet	Soulaphone Inthavong	ສຸລາພອນ ອິນທະວົງ	New	Male	—	—	—	—	—	—	—	—	—	—
116	Savannakhet	Khamparn Khenvongsack	ຄໍາປານ ເຄນວົງສາ	New	Male	—	—	—	—	—	—	—	—	—	—
117	Savannakhet	Souksavanh Xaysombath	ສຸກສະຫວັນ ໄຊສົມບັດ	Old	Male	—	—	—	—	—	—	—	—	—	—
118	Savannakhet	Saysomseun Phothisan	ໄຊຊົມຊື່ນ ໂພທິສານ	Old	Female	—	—	—	—	—	—	—	—	—	—
119	Savannakhet	Vorasith Sivongdao	ວິລະສິດ ສີວົງດາວ	New	Male	—	—	—	—	—	—	—	—	—	—
120	Savannakhet	Hongkham Xayakhom	ຫົງຄໍາ ໄຊຍະຄົມ	New	Female	—	—	—	—	—	—	—	—	—	—
121	Savannakhet	Saengka Souvannakhong	ແສງກາ ສຸວັນນະຄົງ	New	Male	—	—	—	—	—	—	—	—	—	—
122	Savannakhet	Phoukhong Chithoublork	ພູຂົງ ຈິດຮູບໂລກ	New	Male	—	—	—	—	—	—	—	—	—	—
123	Saravan	Siheng Homsombath	ສີເຮັງ ຫອມສົມບັດ	New	Male	—	—	—	—	—	—	—	—	—	—
124	Saravan	Soubanh Savabouth	ສຸບັນ ສະວະບຸດ	Old	Male	—	—	—	—	—	—	—	—	—	—
125	Saravan	Khamsing Saysompheng	ຄໍາສິງ ໄຊສົມແພງ	New	Male	—	—	—	—	—	—	—	—	—	—
126	Saravan	Padeumphone Sonthany	ປະເດີມພອນ ສົນທະນີ	New	Male	—	—	—	—	—	—	—	—	—	—
127	Saravan	Khanxay Latthahao	ຂັນໄຊ ລັດຖະເຮົ້າ	New	Male	—	—	—	—	—	—	—	—	—	—
128	Saravan	Phonphet Ounkeo	ພອນເພັດ ອຸ່ນແກ້ວ	New	Female	—	—	—	—	—	—	—	—	—	—
129	Saravan	Saysamone Inthisene	ສາຍສະໜອນ ອິນທິເສນ	Old	Male	—	—	—	—	—	—	—	—	—	—
130	Saravan	Thongbay Xayasane	ທອງໃບ ໄຊຍະສານ	New	Female	—	—	—	—	—	—	—	—	—	—
131	Saravan	Souksavanh Chanthisouk	ສຸກສະຫວັນ ຈັນທິສຸກ	New	Male	—	—	—	—	—	—	—	—	—	—
132	Champasak	Sommad Pholsena	ສົມມາດ ພົນເສນາ	New	Male	—	—	—	—	—	—	—	—	—	Member
133	Champasak	Saithong Xayavong	ສາຍທອງ ໄຊຍະວົງ	Old	Male	—	—	—	—	—	—	—	—	—	—
134	Champasak	Saichay Kommasith	ສາຍໃຈ ກົມມະສິດ	New	Male	—	—	—	—	—	—	—	—	—	—
135	Champasak	Amphay Chitmanon	ອຳໄພ ຈິດມານົນ	Old	Male	—	—	—	—	—	—	—	—	—	—
136	Champasak	Chanthaboun Souk-aloun	ຈັນທະບູນ ສຸກອາລຸນ	New	Male	—	—	—	—	—	—	—	—	—	—
137	Champasak	Bounmy Chounlachak	ບຸນມີ ຈຸນລະຈັກ	New	Female	—	—	—	—	—	—	—	—	—	—
138	Champasak	Keolattana Sihavong	ແກ້ວລັດຕະນະ ສີຫາວົງ	New	Male	—	—	—	—	—	—	—	—	—	—
139	Champasak	Chansoda Phonthip	ຈັນໂສດາ ພອນທິບ	New	Female	—	—	—	—	—	—	—	—	—	—
140	Champasak	Somxay Sihachak	ສົມໄຊ ສີຫາຈັກ	Old	Male	—	—	—	—	—	—	—	—	—	—
141	Champasak	Manivong Saenlath	ມະນີວົງ ແສນລາດ	Old	Male	—	—	—	—	—	—	—	—	—	—
142	Champasak	Khamtay Keoduangdy	ຄໍາໄຕ ແກ້ວດວງດີ	Old	Male	—	—	—	—	—	—	—	—	—	—
143	Champasak	Sivilay Keopaseuth	ສິວິໄລ ແກ້ວປະເສີດ	New	Male	—	—	—	—	—	—	—	—	—	—
144	Champasak	Xaybandith Rasphone	ໄຊບັນດິດ ຣາຊະພົນ	New	Male	—	—	—	—	—	—	—	—	—	—
145	Champasak	Somsack Saengsakda	ສົມສັກ ແສງສັກດາ	New	Male	—	—	—	—	—	—	—	—	—	—
146	Champasak	Bounsouvanh Phoxayxanasack	ບຸນສຸວັນ ໂພໄຊຊະນະສັກ	New	Female	—	—	—	—	—	—	—	—	—	—
147	Sekong	Dongphet Phayon	ດົງເພັດ ພະຍົນ	Old	Male	—	—	—	—	—	—	—	—	—	—
148	Sekong	Thadsadaphone Chanthamath	ທັດສະດາພອນ ຈັນທະມາດ	New	Female	—	—	—	—	—	—	—	—	—	—
149	Sekong	Phaengsy Silavy	ແພງສີ ສີລາວີ	New	Male	—	—	—	—	—	—	—	—	—	—
150	Sekong	Haymany Vongnorkeo	ໄຮມະນີ ວົງໜໍ່ແກ້ວ	Old	Female	—	—	—	—	—	—	—	—	—	—
151	Sekong	Khampasith Thepvongsa	ຄໍາປະສິດ ເທບວົງສາ	New	Male	—	—	—	—	—	—	—	—	—	—
152	Sekong	Sidavong Duangpany	ສີດາວົງ ດວງປານີ	New	Male	—	—	—	—	—	—	—	—	—	—
153	Attapeu	Minaphone Xaysomphou	ມີນາພອນ ໄຊສົມພູ	New	Female	—	—	—	—	—	—	—	—	—	—
154	Attapeu	Maniso Xamounty	ມະນີໂສ ຊາມຸນຕີ	Old	Male	—	—	—	—	—	—	—	—	—	—
155	Attapeu	Phonmany Khienxayavong	ພອນມະນີ ຂຽນໄຊຍະວົງ	New	Female	—	—	—	—	—	—	—	—	—	—
156	Attapeu	Khampasong Latsachak	ຄໍາປະສົງ ລາດຊະຈັກ	New	Male	—	—	—	—	—	—	—	—	—	—
157	Attapeu	Souksamlane Xayasaeng	ສຸກສໍາລານ ໄຊຍະແສງ	New	Male	—	—	—	—	—	—	—	—	—	—
158	Attapeu	Bounxou Soulinanthong	ບຸນຊູ ສຸລິນັນທອງ	New	Male	—	—	—	—	—	—	—	—	—	—
159	Xaysomboun	Daeng Pathoumthong	ແດງ ປະທຸມທອງ	New	Male	—	—	—	—	—	—	—	—	—	—
160	Xaysomboun	Thanta Kongphaly	ທັນຕາ ກອງຜາລີ	Old	Male	—	—	—	—	—	—	—	—	—	—
161	Xaysomboun	Vixaythor Phialuangchongser	ວິໄຊທໍ່ ເພຍຫຼວງຈົ່ງເສີ	Old	Male	—	—	—	—	—	—	—	—	—	—
162	Xaysomboun	Somvanh Thammaxay	ສົມວັນ ທໍາມາໄຊ	New	Male	—	—	—	—	—	—	—	—	—	—
163	Xaysomboun	Khankab Xayakoummane	ຂັນກາບ ໄຊຍະກຸມມານ	New	Female	—	—	—	—	—	—	—	—	—	—
164	Xaysomboun	Khamdone Chanthavong	ຄໍາດອນ ຈັນທະວົງ	New	Male	—	—	—	—	—	—	—	—	—	—
