= Boupha =

Boupha is a surname. Notable people with the surname include:

- Bounyong Boupha, Laotian politician
- Kham Ouane Boupha (born 1932), Laotian soldier and politician
- Khampheng Boupha (1923–2011), Laotian politician
