= 7th Standing Committee of the National Assembly of Laos =

7th Standing Committee
- Emblem of Laos

15 June 2011 – 20 April 2016 (3 years, 309 days) Overview
- Type: Session of the Standing Committee of the National Assembly of Laos
- Election: 1st Session of the 7th National Assembly

Leadership
- President: Pany Yathotu
- Vice President: Saysomphone Phomvihane; Somphanh Phengkhammy

Members
- Total: 10

The 7th Standing Committee of the National Assembly of Laos was elected by the 1st Session of the 7th National Assembly on 15 June 2011 and was replaced by the 8th Standing Committee on 20 April 2016.

== Government ==
Rank	Office	Name	Akson Lao	6th STC	8th STC
1	President of the Standing Committee	Pany Yathotu		Old	Reelected
2	Vice President of the Standing Committee	Saysomphone Phomvihane		Old	Not
3	Vice President of the Standing Committee	Somphanh Phengkhammy		Old	Reelected
4	President of the Law Committee	Davone Vangvichit		New	Not
5	President of the Economics, Planning and Finance Committee	Souvanpheng Boupphanouvong		New	Not
6	President of the Cultural and Social Affairs Committee	Phonethep Pholsena		New	Not
7	President of the Ethnic Affairs Committee	Douangdy Outhachak		New	Not
8	President of the National Defence and Security Committee	Vilay Douangmany		New	Not
9	President of the Foreign Affairs Committee	Koukeo Akkhamounty		New	Not
10	Head of the Secretariat	Ounkeo Vouthirath		New	Not
