= 8th Standing Committee of the National Assembly of Laos =

8th Standing Committee

20 April 2016 – 22 March 2021 (4 years, 336 days) Overview
- Type: Session of the Standing Committee of the National Assembly of Laos
- Election: 1st Session of the 8th National Assembly

Leadership
- President: Pany Yathotu
- Vice President: Saysomphone Phomvihane; Somphanh Phengkhammy

Members
- Total: 10

The 8th Standing Committee of the National Assembly of Laos was elected by the 1st Session of the 8th National Assembly on 20 April 2016 and was replaced by the 9th Standing Committee on 22 March 2021.

== Government ==
Rank	Office	Name	Akson Lao	7th STC	9th STC
1	President of the Standing Committee	Pany Yathotu		Old	Not
2	Vice President of the Standing Committee	Sengnouan Xayalath		New	Not
3	Vice President of the Standing Committee	Somphanh Phengkhammy		Old	Not
4	Vice President of the Standing Committee	Bounpone Bouttanavong		New	Not
5	Vice President of the Standing Committee	Sisay Leudetmounsone		New	Not
6	President of the Law Committee	Saithong Keoduangdy		New	Not
7	President of the Economics, Planning and Finance Committee	Bounpone Sisoulath		New	Not
8	President of the Planning, Finance and Auditing Committee	Vilayvong Bouddakham		New	Not
9	President of the Cultural and Social Affairs Committee	Somphou Duongsuvanh		New	Not
10	President of the Ethnic Affairs Committee	Buaphanh Likaiya		New	Not
11	President of the National Defence and Security Committee	Khamsouk Viinthavong		New	Not
12	President of the Justice Committee	Buakham Thipphavong		New	Not
13	President of the Foreign Affairs Committee	Eksavang Vongvichit		New	Not
14	Head of the Secretariat	Suansavanh Vignaket		New	Not
