= Phommalath =

Phommalath is a Laotian surname. Notable people with the surname include:

- Singkham Phommalath, Laotian politician
- Sivanxai Phommalath, Lotian activist
