= Somvang Thammasith =

Laotian politician

Somvang Thammasith is a Laotian politician and former army colonel. He is a member of the Lao People's Revolutionary Party. He was a member of the 6th and 7th term of the National Assembly of Laos.
