= Chanhsy Vannavongxay =

Laotian politician

Chanhsy Vannavongxay is a Laotian politician. She is a member of the Lao People's Revolutionary Party. She is a representative of the National Assembly of Laos for Houaphanh Province (Constituency 8).
