= Khamchanh Sakountava =

Laotian politician

Khamchanh Sakountava is a Laotian politician. He is a member of the Lao People's Revolutionary Party. He is a representative of the National Assembly of Laos for Phongsaly Province (Constituency 2).
