= Onchanh Phetsalath =

Laotian politician

Onchanh Phetsalath is a Laotian politician and colonel in the Lao Army. He is a member of the Lao People's Revolutionary Party. He is a representative of the National Assembly of Laos for Sainyabuli Province (Constituency 7).
