= Chanhthuem Latmany =

Laotian politician

Chanhthuem Latmany is a Laotian politician. She is a member of the Lao People's Revolutionary Party. She is a representative of the National Assembly of Laos for Oudomxay Province (Constituency 4).
