= Khamkeut Phommavongsy =

Laotian politician

Khamkeut Phommavongsy is a Laotian politician and lieutenant colonel in the Lao Army. He is a member of the Lao People's Revolutionary Party. He is a representative of the National Assembly of Laos for Luang Prabang Province (Constituency 6).
