= Khamphaeng Chitavong =

Laotian politician

Khamphaeng Chitavong is a Laotian politician. He is a member of the Lao People's Revolutionary Party. He is a representative of the National Assembly of Laos for Oudomxay Province (Constituency 4).
