= Khamphat Pheubobouda =

Laotian politician

Khamphat Pheubobouda is a Laotian politician and lieutenant colonel in the Laotian Army. He is a member of the Lao People's Revolutionary Party. He is a representative of the National Assembly of Laos for the city of Vientiane (Constituency 1).
