= Phaeng Lylavong =

Laotian politician

Phaeng Lylavong is a Laotian politician who is a member of the Lao People's Revolutionary Party. Lylavong is a representative of the National Assembly of Laos for Phongsaly Province (constituency 2).
