= Thatsadaphone Nosing =

Laotian politician

Thatsadaphone Nosing is a Laotian politician. She is a member of the Lao People's Revolutionary Party. She is a representative of the National Assembly of Laos for Bokeo Province (Constituency 5).
