= Vassady Khotyotha =

Laotian politician

Vassady Khotyotha is a Laotian politician. She is a member of the Lao People's Revolutionary Party. She is a representative of the National Assembly of Laos for Attapu Province (Constituency 17)
