= Siphone Intala =

Laotian politician

Siphone Intala is a Laotian politician. He is a member of the Lao People's Revolutionary Party. He is a representative of the National Assembly of Laos for Oudomxay province (Constituency 4).
