= Chanhsouk Bounpachit =

Laotian politician

Chanhsouk Bounpachit is a Laotian politician. He is a member of the Lao People's Revolutionary Party. He is a representative of the National Assembly of Laos for Bokeo Province (Constituency 5).
