= Mysone Thongsaysy =

Laotian politician

Mysone Thongsaysy is a Laotian politician. She is a member of the Lao People's Revolutionary Party. She is a representative of the National Assembly of Laos for Houaphanh Province (Constituency 8).
