= Thongleuan Inpanya =

Laotian politician

Thongleuan Inpanya is a Laotian politician and lieutenant colonel in the Lao Army. He is a member of the Lao People's Revolutionary Party. He is a representative of the National Assembly of Laos for Sainyabuli Province (Constituency 7).
