= Khempheng Pholsena =

Laotian politician

Personal details
- Born: 6 June 1948 (age 78) Pakse, Laos
- Education: Moscow Energy Institute

Khempheng Pholsena (born 1948) is a Laotian politician and head of the Water Resources and the Environment Authority.

== Early life ==
Khempheng Pholsena was born on 6 June 1948 in Pakse, Champasak Province. For higher studies she moved to Vietnam and later attended the Moscow Energy Institute in erstwhile Soviet Union.

== Career ==
Pholsena began her career with a job in the Laotian Ministry of Trade and Industry. For a brief period, she worked as a secretary at the Laotian embassy in Moscow before being appointed the first female Vice-Minister in charge for international economic cooperation. Later she served as the Committee for Planning and Cooperation's vice-president and in 1996 was transferred to the Prime Minister's Office.

Pholsena was chosen the first woman vice-president of the Asian Development Bank in 2004. She is also the President of the Lao National Mekong Committee beside being the Minister-in-charge for Water Resources. In 2014, she was appointed the Minister of Industry and Commerce and vice-president of the National Women's Organisation.
