= Bounnan Bounyaseng =

Laotian politician

Bounnan Bounyaseng is a Laotian politician. He is a member of the Lao People's Revolutionary Party. He is a representative of the National Assembly of Laos for Attapu Province (Constituency 17)
