= Bang-on Xayalath =

Laotian politician

Bang-on Xayalath is a Laotian politician. She is a member of the Lao People's Revolutionary Party, and a representative of the National Assembly of Laos for the city of Vientiane (Constituency 1).
