= Tong Yeutho =

Laotian politician

Tong Yeutho (Lao: ຕົງ ເຢີທໍ; born 15 April 1946) is a Laotian politician. He is a member of the Lao People's Revolutionary Party. He is a representative of the National Assembly of Laos for Houaphanh Province (Constituency 8).
