= Bountiem Phissamay =

Laotian scientist

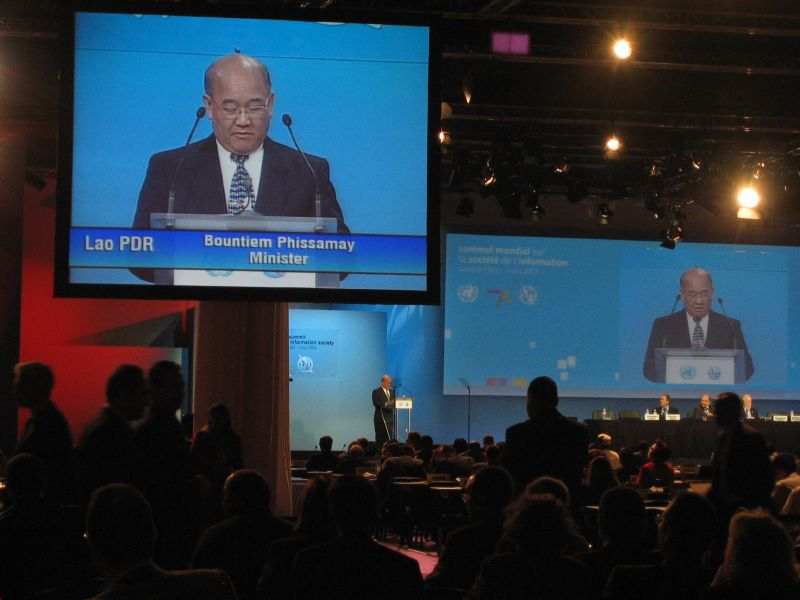

Bountiem Phissamay or Bounteim Phitsamai (born September 15, 1942) is a Laotian politician and scientist. He was born in Luang Prabang. He was educated in France and holds doctorates in physics and mathematics. He is President of the Science, Technology and Environment Agency (STEA) in Laos and served as President of the Lao Football Federation. As of 2010, he was minister, head of the Science, Technology and Environment Organisation of Laos.

He is a member of the National Assembly of Laos. He was awarded a 2000 Outstanding Intellectual of the 21st century. He is a member of IBC, International Biographical of Cambridge University, England. He studied at Toulouse University and Soka University.
