= Singkham Phommalath =

Laotian politician

Singkham Phommalath is a Laotian politician. He is a member of the Lao People's Revolutionary Party. He is a representative of the National Assembly of Laos for Luang Prabang Province (Constituency 6).
