= Thongvankham Sitthilath =

Laotian politician

Thongvankham Sitthilath is a Laotian politician. She is a member of the Lao People's Revolutionary Party. She is a representative of the National Assembly of Laos for the city of Vientiane (Constituency 1).
