= Vonekham Phetthavong =

Laotian politician

Vonekham Phetthavong is a Laotian politician. He is a member of the Lao People's Revolutionary Party. He is a representative of the National Assembly of Laos for Louang Namtha Province (Constituency 3).
