= Amexiong Yialeng =

Laotian politician

Amexiong Yialeng is a Laotian politician. He is a member of the Lao People's Revolutionary Party. He is a representative of the National Assembly of Laos for Sainyabuli Province (Constituency 7).
