= Khamlek Keosomphanh =

Laotian politician

Khamlek Keosomphanh is a Laotian politician. He is a member of the Lao People's Revolutionary Party. He is a representative of the National Assembly of Laos for Houaphanh Province (Constituency 8).
