= Duangsavath Souphanouvong =

Laotian politician

Duangsavath Souphanouvong is a Laotian politician. He is a member of the Lao People's Revolutionary Party. He is a representative of the National Assembly of Laos for Sainyabuli Province (Constituency 7). In 2007, he is Government Apparatus Minister, Adviser to the LPDR Prime Minister (Minister of the Prime Minister's Palace).
