= Latsamy Mingboupha =

Laotian politician

Latsamy Mingboupha is a Laotian politician. She is a member of the Lao People's Revolutionary Party. She is a representative of the National Assembly of Laos for Louang Namtha Province (Constituency 3).
