= Ounkeo Vouthilath =

Laotian politician

Ounkeo Vouthilath is a Laotian politician. He is a member of the Lao People's Revolutionary Party. He is a representative of the National Assembly of Laos for Louang Namtha Province (Constituency 3).
