= Bounpone Sisoulath =

Laotian politician

Bounpone Sisoulath is a Laotian politician. He is a member of the Lao People's Revolutionary Party. He is a representative of the National Assembly of Laos for the city of Vientiane (Constituency 1).
