= Sisay Leudetmounsone =

Laotian politician

Head of the LPRP Central Committee Organisation Commission

11th term
- Incumbent
- Assumed office 2 February 2021
- General Secretary: Thongloun Sisoulith
- Preceded by: Chansy Phosikham

4th-ranked Vice President of the National Assembly of Laos

8th term
- In office 20 April 2016 – 22 March 2021 Serving with Sengnouan Xayalath, Somphanh Phengkhammy and Bounpone Bouttanavong.
- Assembly President: Pany Yathotou
- Preceded by: Post established
- Succeeded by: Khambay Damlath

Personal details
- Born: 8 March 1959 (age 67) Ban Naphai, Saravan province, Kingdom of Laos
- Party: Lao People's Revolutionary Party
- Occupation: Politician

Sisay Leudetmounsone (Lao: ສີໄສ ລືເດດມູນສອນ; born 8 March 1959) is a Laotian politician and member of the Lao People's Revolutionary Party (LPRP). She currently serves as Head of the LPRP Central Committee Organisation Commission, and is a member of the 11th Central Committee, 11th Politburo and the 11th Secretariat.

From 2016 to 2021 she served as 4th-ranked Vice President of the National Assembly of Laos and Vice President of the National Assembly's Standing Committee.

She's been a member of the Central Committee since the 8th term in 2006.

Additionally, she served as President of the Lao Women's Union from 2004 to 2020 when Sisavath Keobounphanh was elected in her place.

== Bibliography ==
Articles:

- Faming, Manynooch (2018). "Big (wo)man politics: gender equality in Laos?". Asian Anthropology. 17 (2). Chinese University of Hong Kong: 116–34. doi:10.1080/1683478X.2018.1463595. S2CID 158508650.

Books:

- Stuart-Fox, Martin (2008). Historical Dictionary of Laos. Scarecrow Press. ISBN 978-0-81086-411-5.
- Vithanyasaat, Sathaaban; Haeng, Sangkhom (2010). ປວັດສາດພັກປະຊາຊົນປະຕິວັດລາວ [History of Lao People’s Revolutionary Party: Brief Summary]. Vientiane, Laos: Lao Academy of Social Sciences. hdl:2344/00009403.
