= Souvanpheng Bouphanouvong =

Laotian politician

Souvanpheng Boupphanouvong
- ສຸວັນເພັງ ບຸບຜານຸວົງ
- Occupation: Minister to the Prime Minister's Office of Laos
- Years active: 2016–present
- Political party: Lao People's Revolutionary Party

Souvanpheng Boupphanouvong is a Laotian politician. She is a member of the Lao People's Revolutionary Party. Dr. Boupphanouvong serves as Minister to the Prime Minister's Office of Laos and is a member of the National Green Growth Steering Committee since 2016.

== Education ==
Dr. Boupphanouvong attended university in Vietnam and holds masters degrees in Political Economics and Political Studies.

== Political Career ==
Dr. Boupphanouvong began her career as the director of the Lao Cotton State Enterprise of the Lao Women's Union in 1996. She later served as a representative in the National Assembly of Laos for 16 years, representing District 13 of Savannakhet Province. From 2011-2016, Boupphanouvong served as a chairperson of the Economics, Planning, and Finance Committee. In 2016, Boupphanouvong began in her role as Minister to the Prime Minister's Office. Also in 2016, she became a member of the National Green Growth Steering Committee, which is an effort by the government of Laos to improve the country's economic status while also minimizing environmental damage. Dr. Bouppanouvong additionally serves as a chairperson on the Citizen Engagement for Good Governance, Accountability, and the Rule of Law (CEGGA) project, which aims to increase citizen-state interaction between the Laotian citizens and government.

=== Environmental Activism ===
In 2018, Dr. Boupphanouvong visited the Nam Er-Phou Louey National Park Office, where she worked with the Wildlife Conservation Association, the Forestry Department of Laos, and other local authorities to discuss the relationship between Laos' environmental stewardship and economic growth.

Dr. Boupphanouvong participated in a 2019 World Bank panel titled, "Invest in Nature: Uncovering the Hidden Value of Biodiversity." She spoke alongside environmental scientist Sir Robert Watson, Dr. Helen Crowley of Kering, Argentinian Vice President of National Parks Emiliano Ezcura, National Development and Planning Minister for Zambia Alexander Chiteme, and Secretary of State for International Development in the UK Alok Sharma. At the panel, Boupphanouvong spoke about the importance of biodiversity in Lao nature-based tourism.
