= National Assembly of Laos =

Parliament of Laos

National Assembly ສະພາແຫ່ງຊາດ Sapha HaengXat

Type
- Type: Unicameral

History
- Preceded by: Supreme People's Assembly

Leadership
- President: Sonexay Siphandone, LPRP since 5 October 2026

Structure
- Seats: 175
- Political groups: Lao Front for National Development (175): LPRP (169); Independents (6)
- Length of term: 5 years

Elections
- Voting system: Bloc voting
- Last election: 22 February 2026

Meeting place
- New National Assembly Building, Vientiane, Laos

Website
- www.na.gov.la

The National Assembly (NA; Lao: ສະພາແຫ່ງຊາດ, romanized: Sapha Haengxat) or formally the National Assembly of the Lao People's Democratic Republic (Lao: ສະພາແຫ່ງຊາດ ແຫ່ງ ສາທາລະນະລັດ ປະຊາທິປະໄຕ ປະຊາຊົນລາວ, romanized: saphahaengxat haeng sathalanalat paxathipatai paxaxon lao) is the supreme state organ of power of Laos. It is the only branch of government in Laos, and per the principle of unified power, all state organs are subservient to it. The National Assembly meets in Vientiane.

Laos is a one-party state, with the Lao People's Revolutionary Party as the sole legal party in the country.

Efforts have been made to increase the capacity of its members, aiming to strengthen their legislative, oversight, and representational capacities.

== History ==
The National Assembly was established by the Lao Constitution of 1991.

Elections were held in 2021. The Lao People's Revolutionary Party (LPRP) took 158 seats in the enlarged 164-member National Assembly while the 6 remaining seats went to independents.

In 2017, construction started on a new National Assembly building, gifted by Vietnam. The construction was completed in 2021.

== Committees ==
Parliamentary committees of the National Assembly include:

- Law Committee
- Economic, Technology and Environment Committee
- Planning, Finance and Audit Committee
- Cultural and Social Committee
- Ethnic Affairs Committee
- National Defence and Security Committee
- Foreign Affairs Committee

== See also ==
- Politics of Laos
- President of the National Assembly of Laos
