= Racial discrimination in Laos =

Racial discrimination in Laos, as well as other human rights violations towards minorities exists, according to international reports, despite Laos being a signatory to the International Convention on the Elimination of All Forms of Racial Discrimination and in violation of the constitution of Laos, which says in part, "Lao citizens, irrespective of their sexes, social statuses, (levels of'] education, faiths and ethnic groups, are equal before the law".

== See also ==
- Insurgency in Laos
- Human rights in Laos
