= Lao People's Army Historical Museum =

War Museum in Laos

The Lao People's Army History Museum (Lao: ຫໍພິພັດພິລະອັດຂອງກອງທັບປະຊາຊົນລາວ) is a military museum located in Vientiane, the capital of Laos. It focuses on the history of the Lao People's Army and its involvement in revolutionary struggles and national defense.

== History ==
The museum was established on 20 January 1976 as the Lao People's Liberation Army Exhibition Hall. It was renamed the Lao People's Army Museum in 1984 and later received its current name, Lao People's Army History Museum, on 30 November 2005.

In 2022–2023, the museum underwent a major renovation, supported by the Vietnamese Ministry of National Defence. The project was completed in December 2023 ahead of the 75th anniversary of the Lao People's Army. It included building repairs, updated facilities, and new visitor amenities.

== Exhibits ==
The museum spans approximately 17,000 square meters and includes both indoor and outdoor displays. Exhibits are arranged chronologically and thematically, covering:

- Laotian military traditions and resistance to colonial powers
- The anti-colonial struggle (1893–1954)
- The U.S. involvement and the Laotian Civil War (1955–1975)
- Post-1975 national defense under the Lao People's Army
- Armored vehicles and artillery
- Dioramas and archival displays

Among the outdoor exhibits are captured American military aircraft including a Bell UH-1 helicopter, F-4 Phantom, and F-105 Thunderchief.

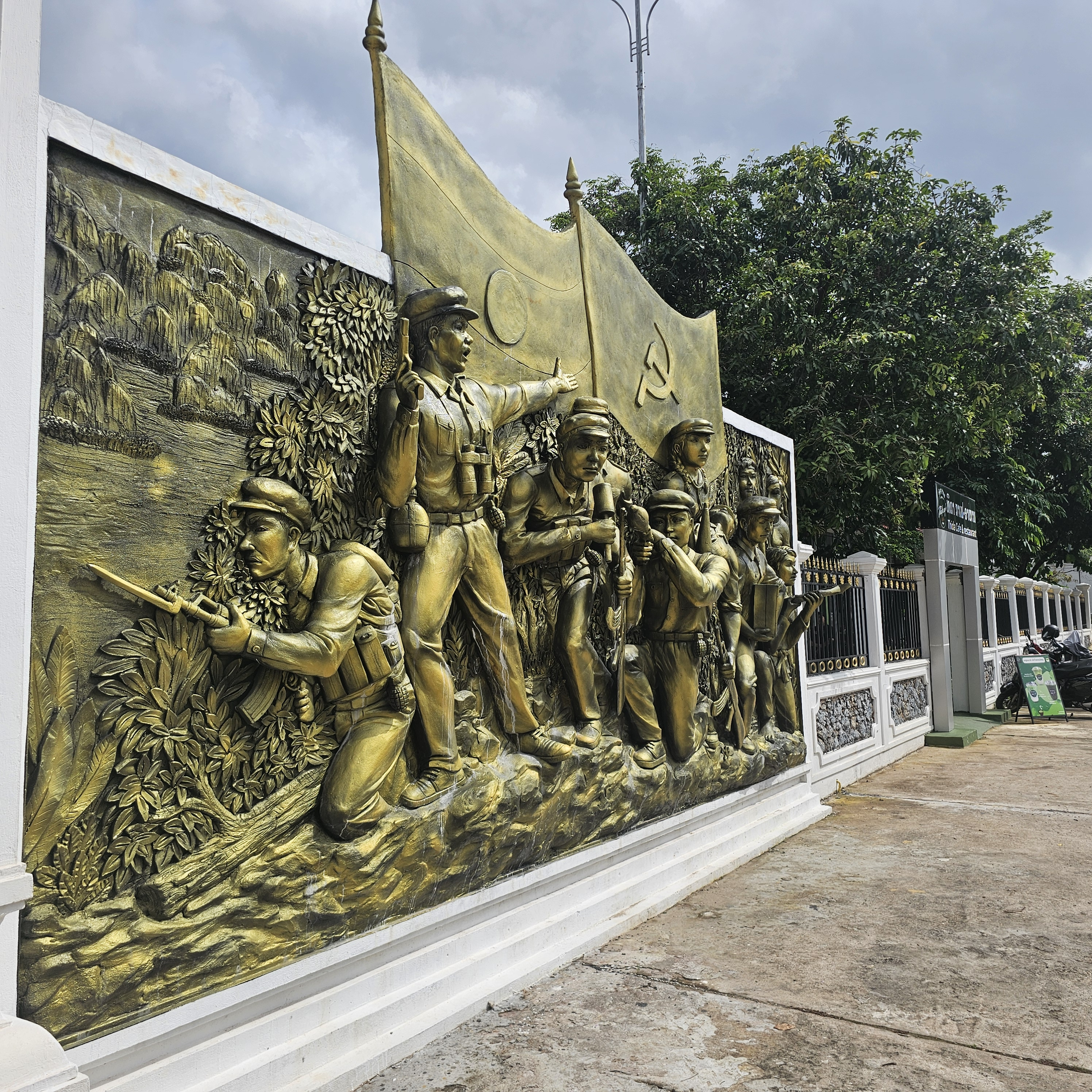
Side View of a Mural at the main entrance to the compound of the Lao People's Army Historical Museum at Vientiane, Laos

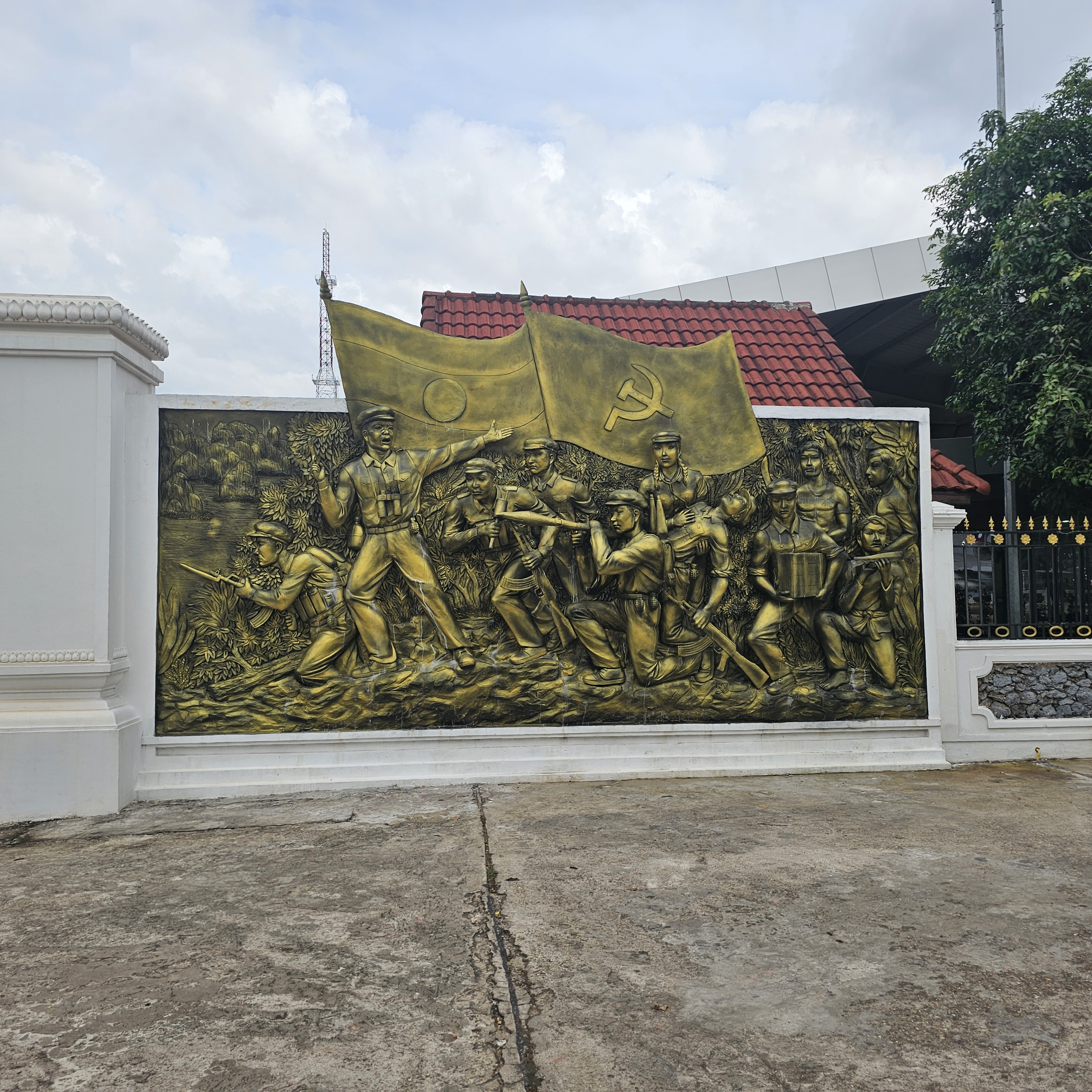
Front View of a Mural at the main entrance to the compound of the Lao People's Army Historical Museum at Vientiane, Laos

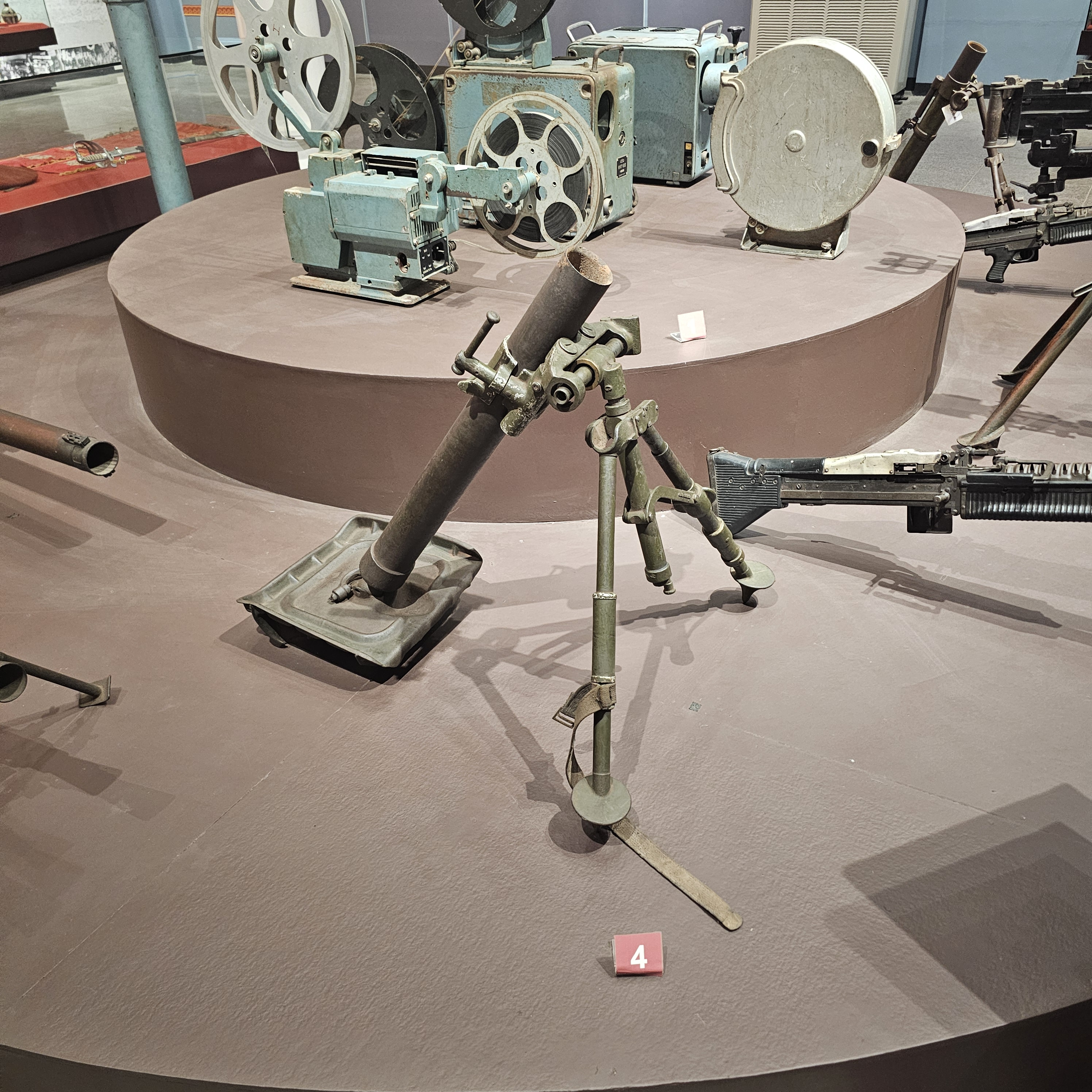
Mortar Weapon at the Lao People's Army Historical Museum at Vientiane, Laos

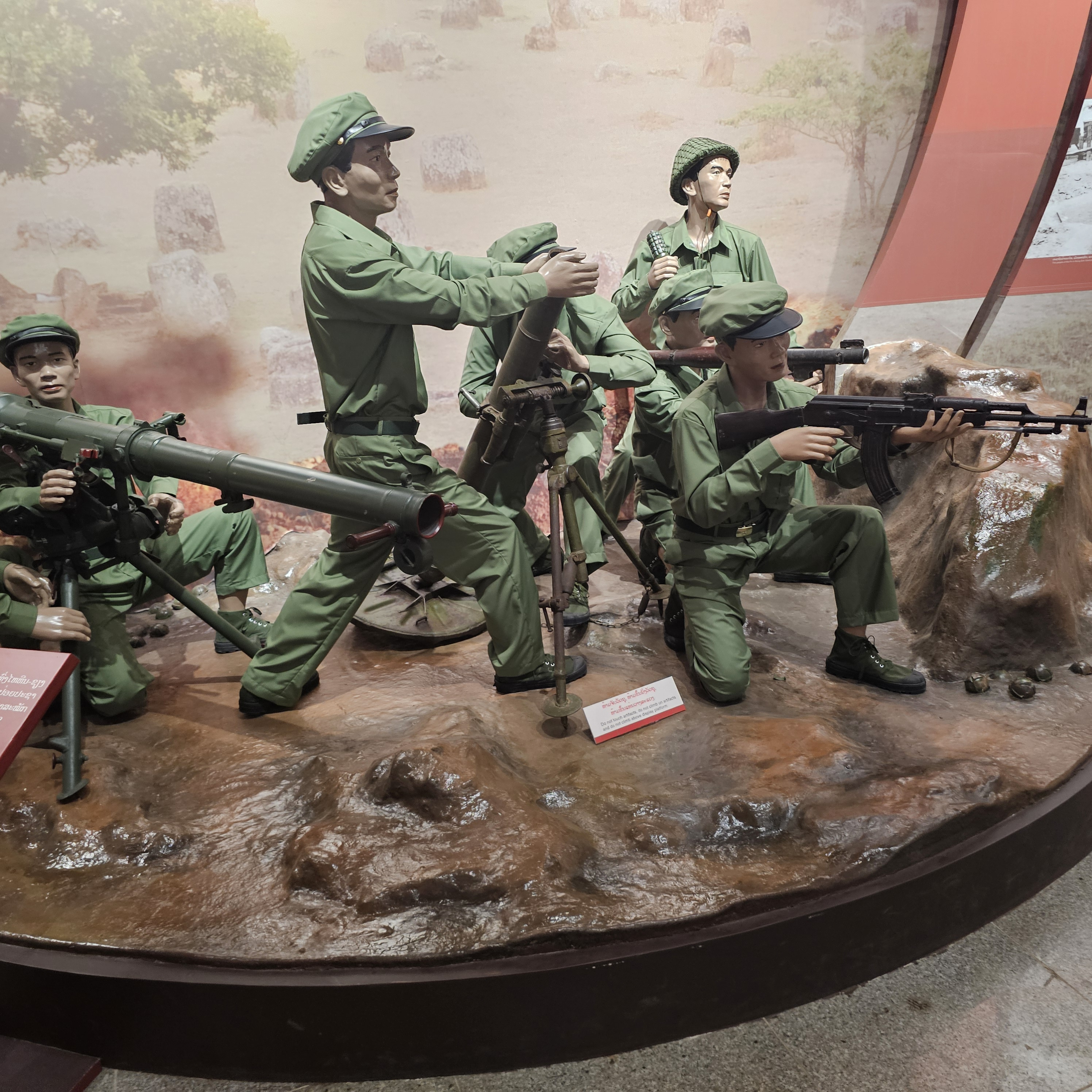
Soldiers in battle depicted at the Lao People's Army Historical Museum at Vientiane, Laos

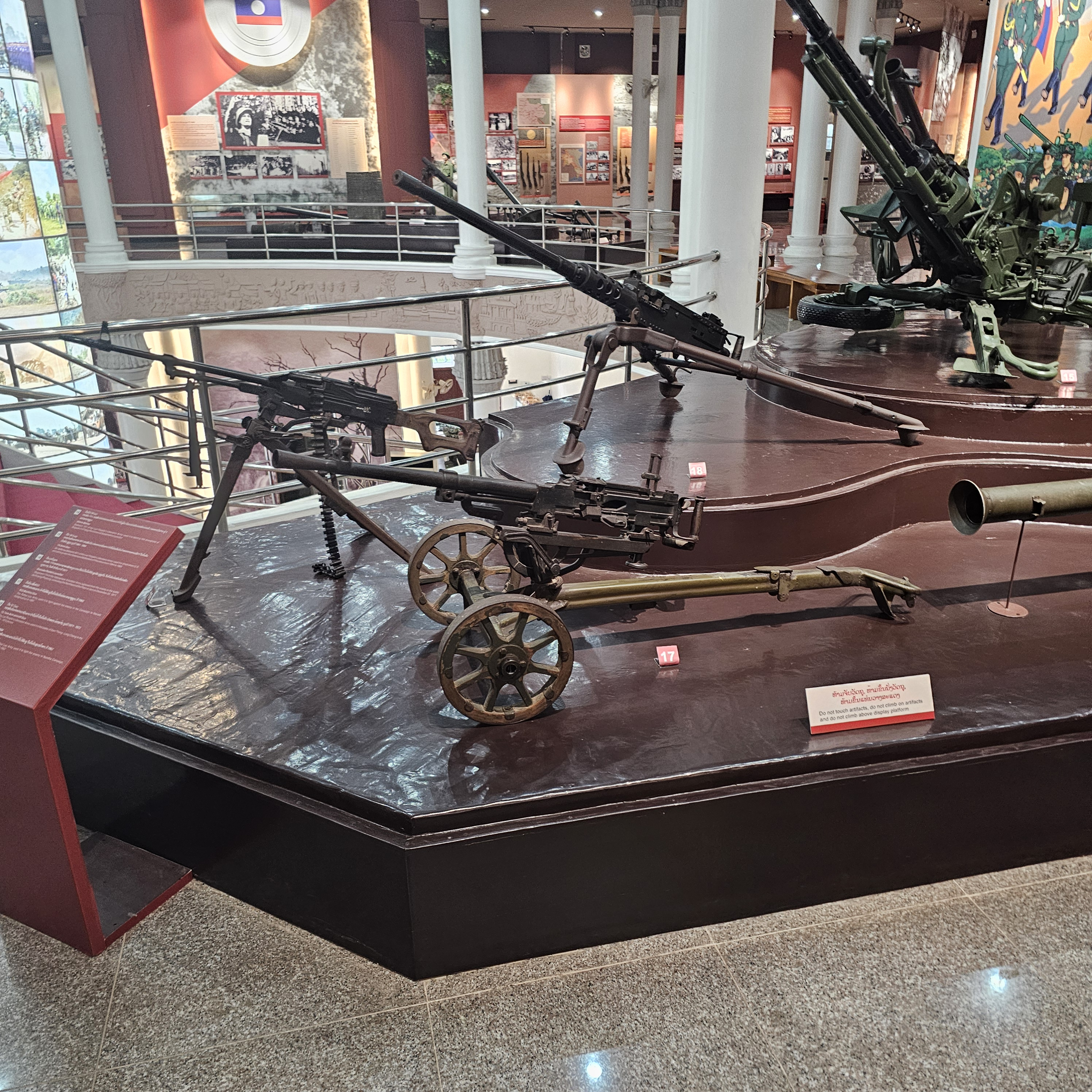
Artillery Weapon at the Lao People's Army Historical Museum at Vientiane, Laos

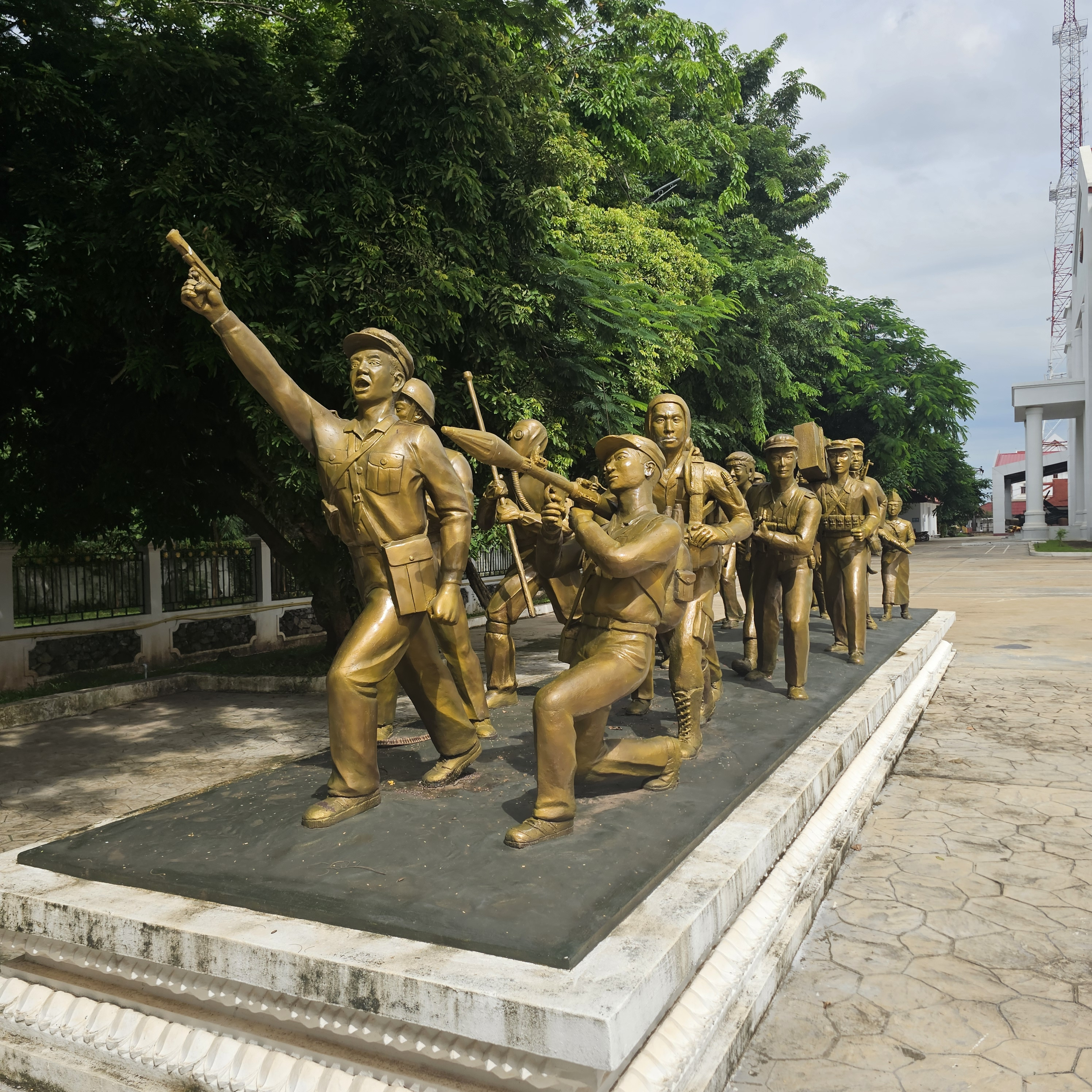
Display of soldiers at the Lao People's Army Historical Museum at Vientiane, Laos

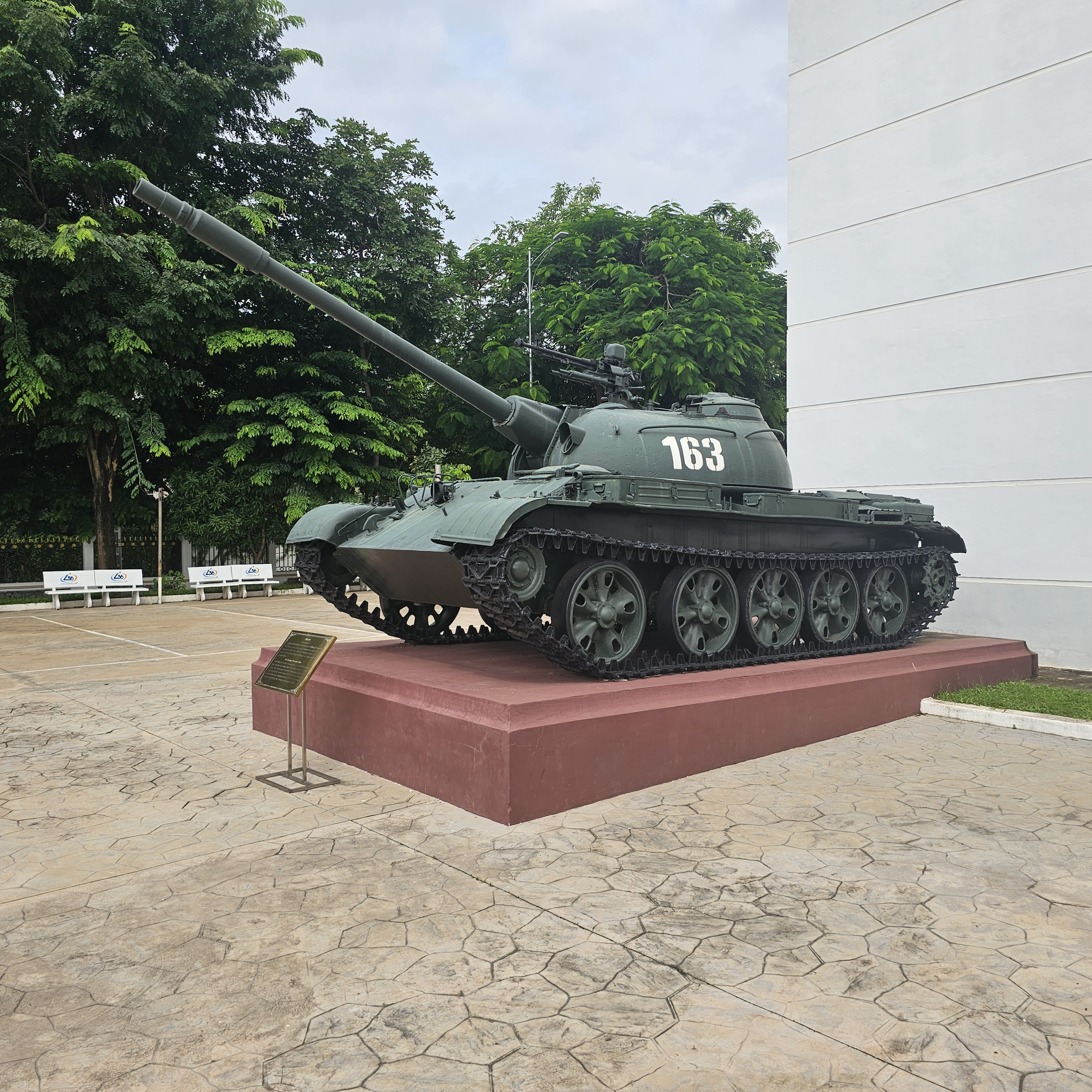
Tank at the Lao People's Army Historical Museum at Vientiane, Laos

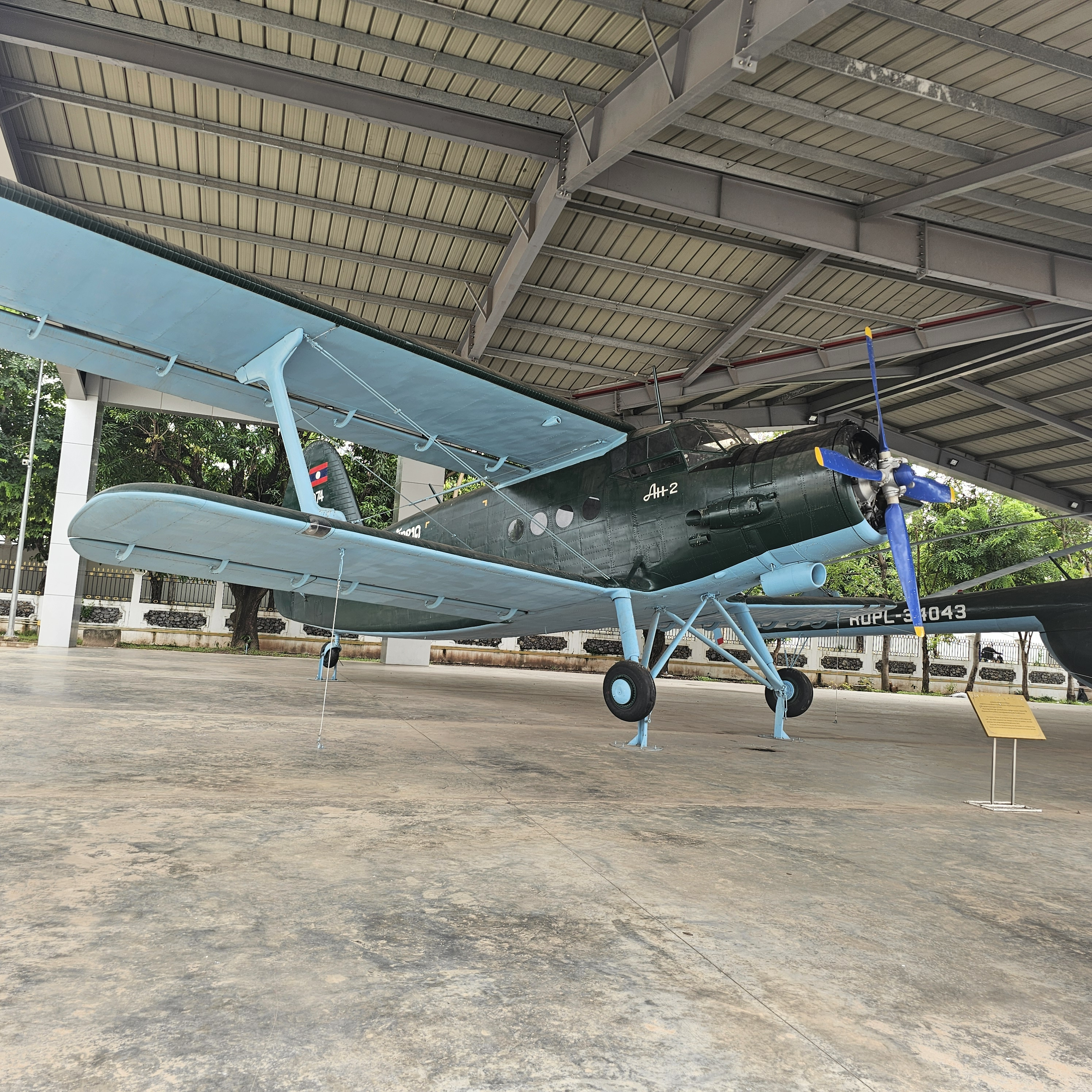
Biplane display at the Lao People's Army Historical Museum at Vientiane, Laos

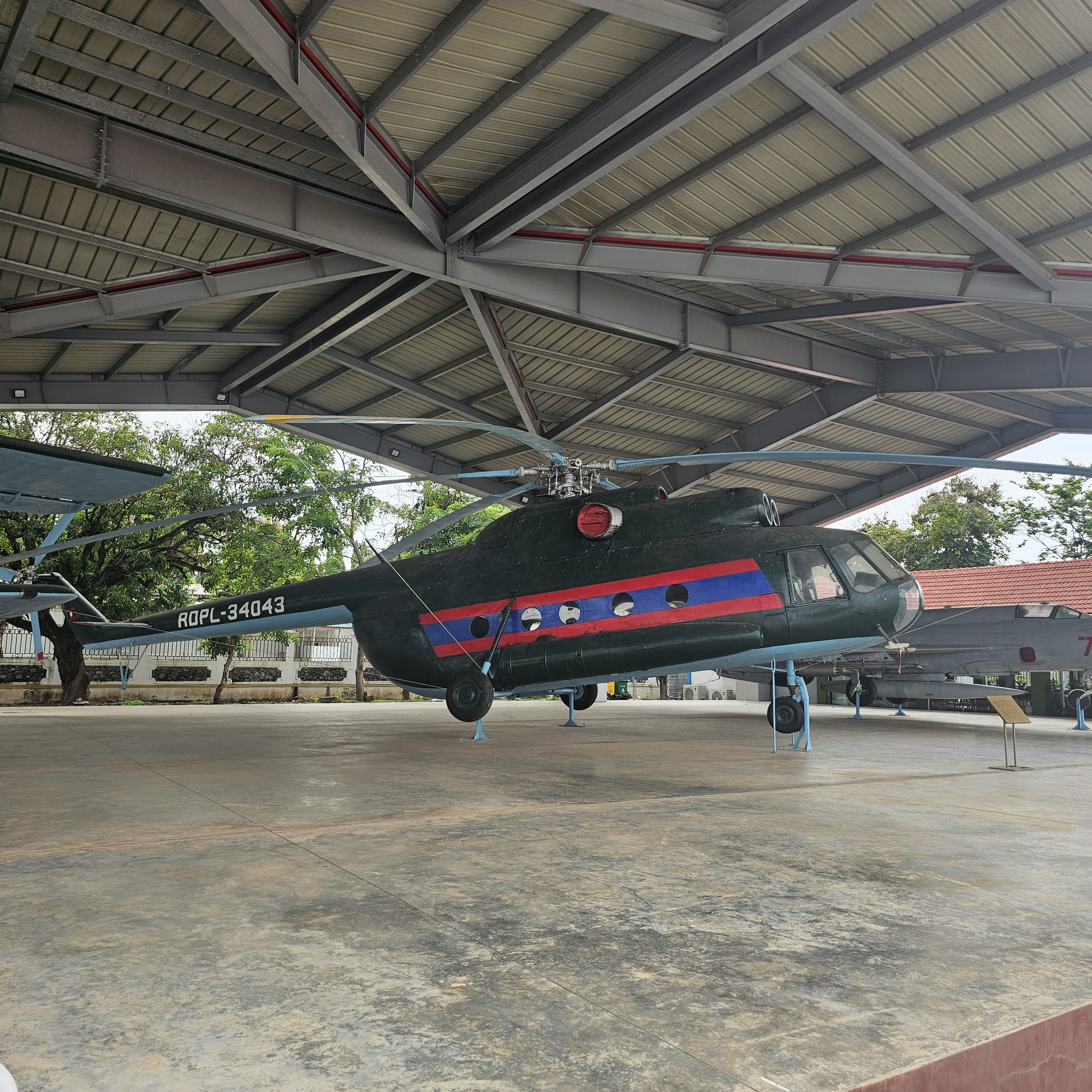
Helicopter display at the Lao People's Army Historical Museum at Vientiane, Laos

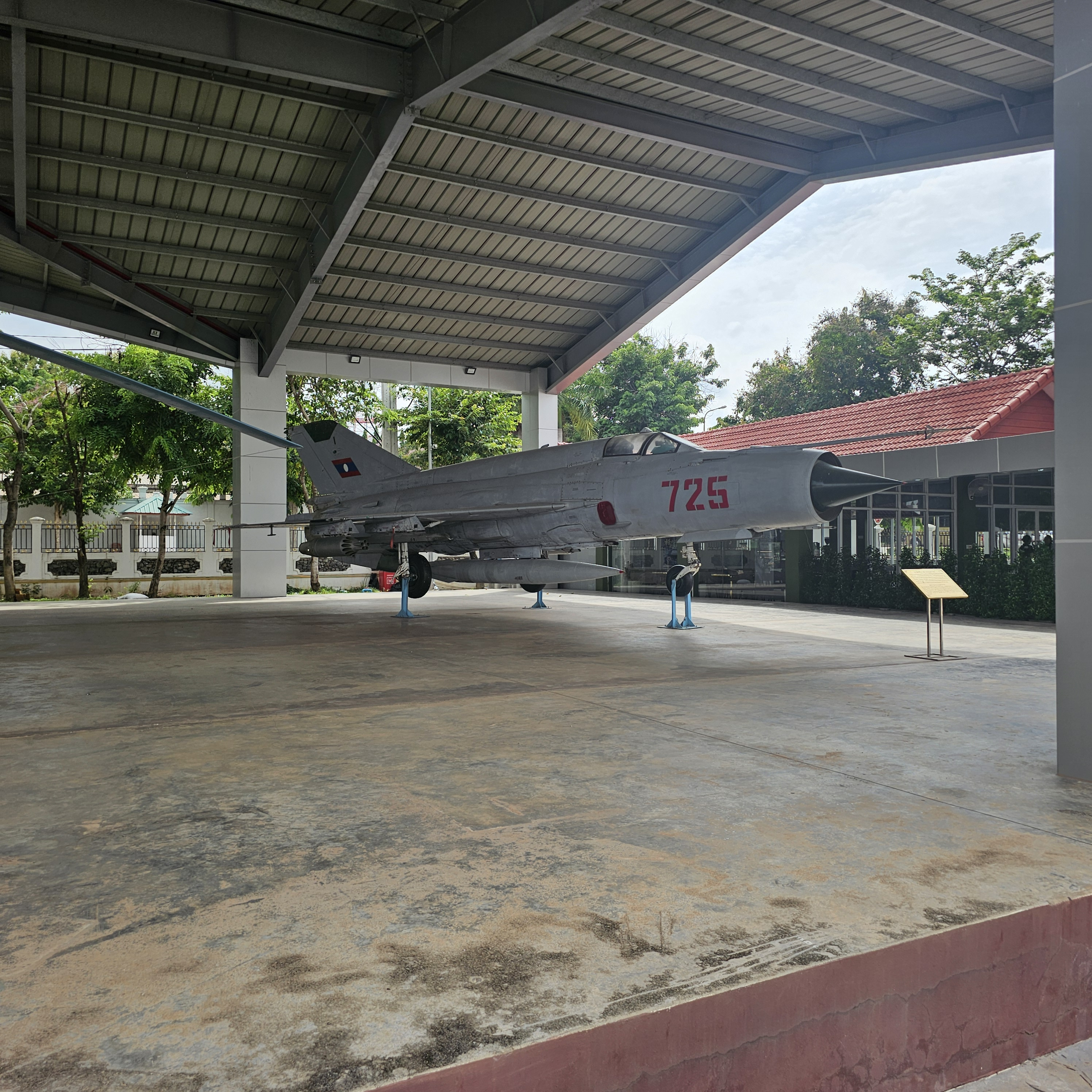
MiG Bison fighter jet at the Lao People's Army Historical Museum at Vientiane, Laos

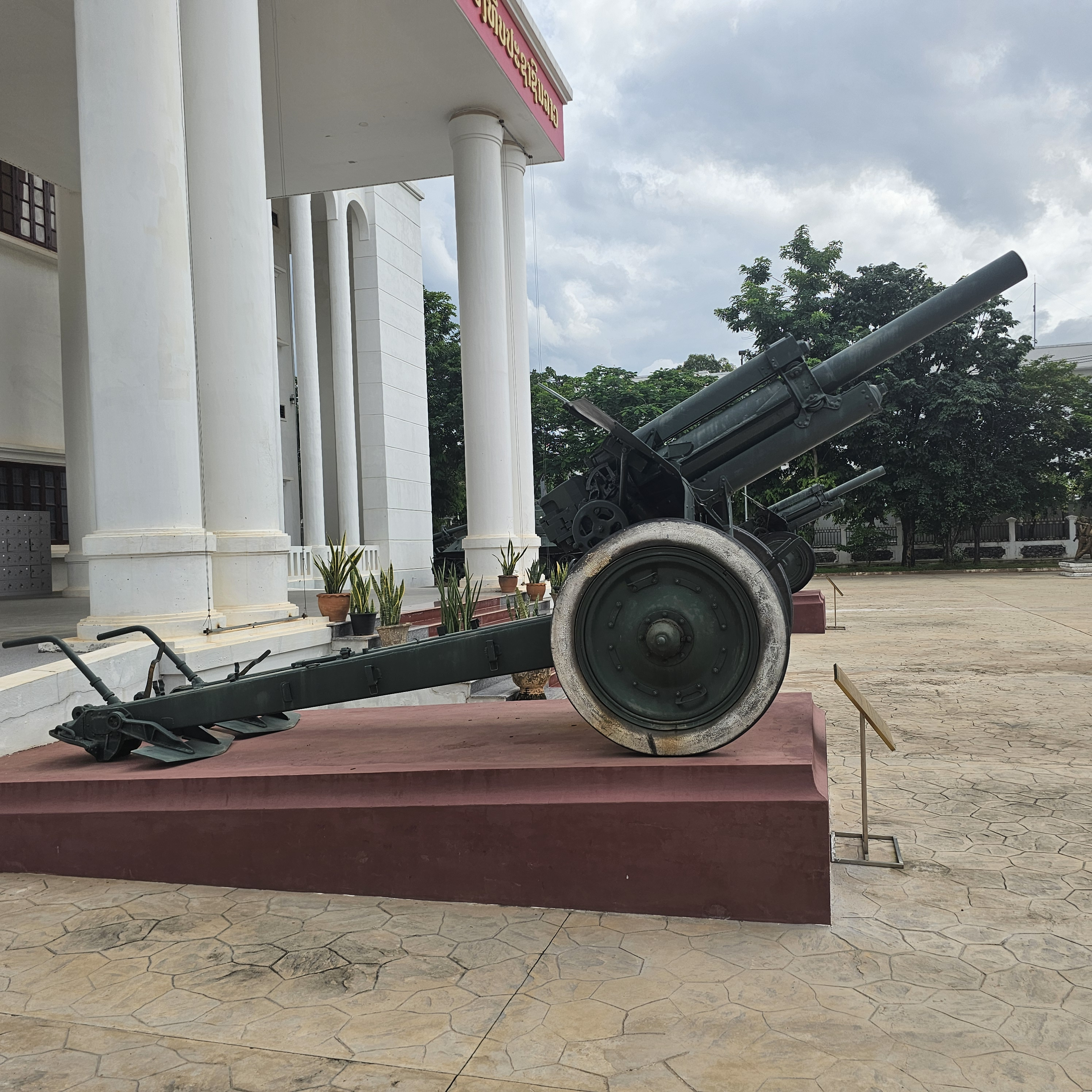
Artillery Weapon at the Lao People's Army Historical Museum at Vientiane, Laos

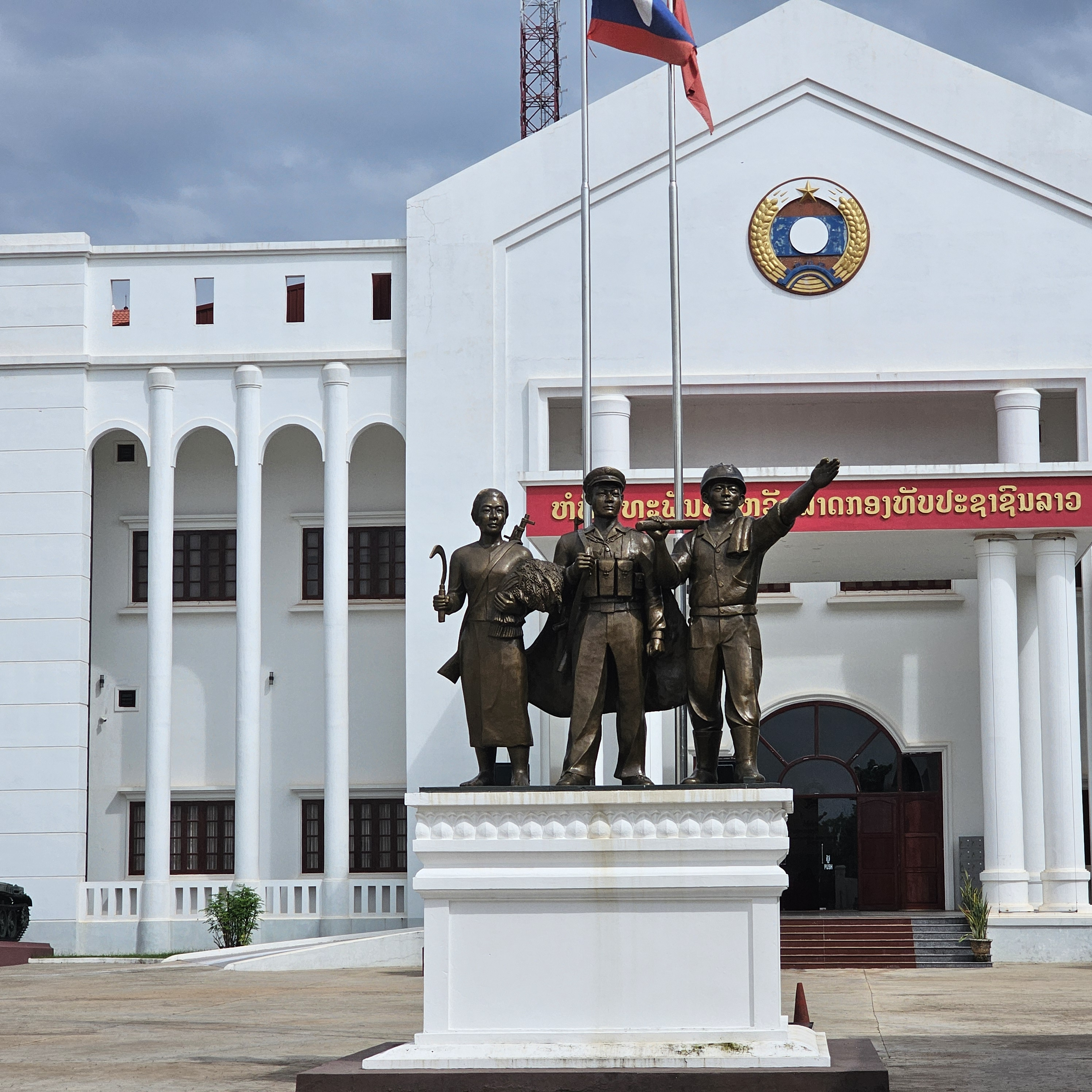
Monument at the Lao People's Army Historical Museum at Vientiane, Laos

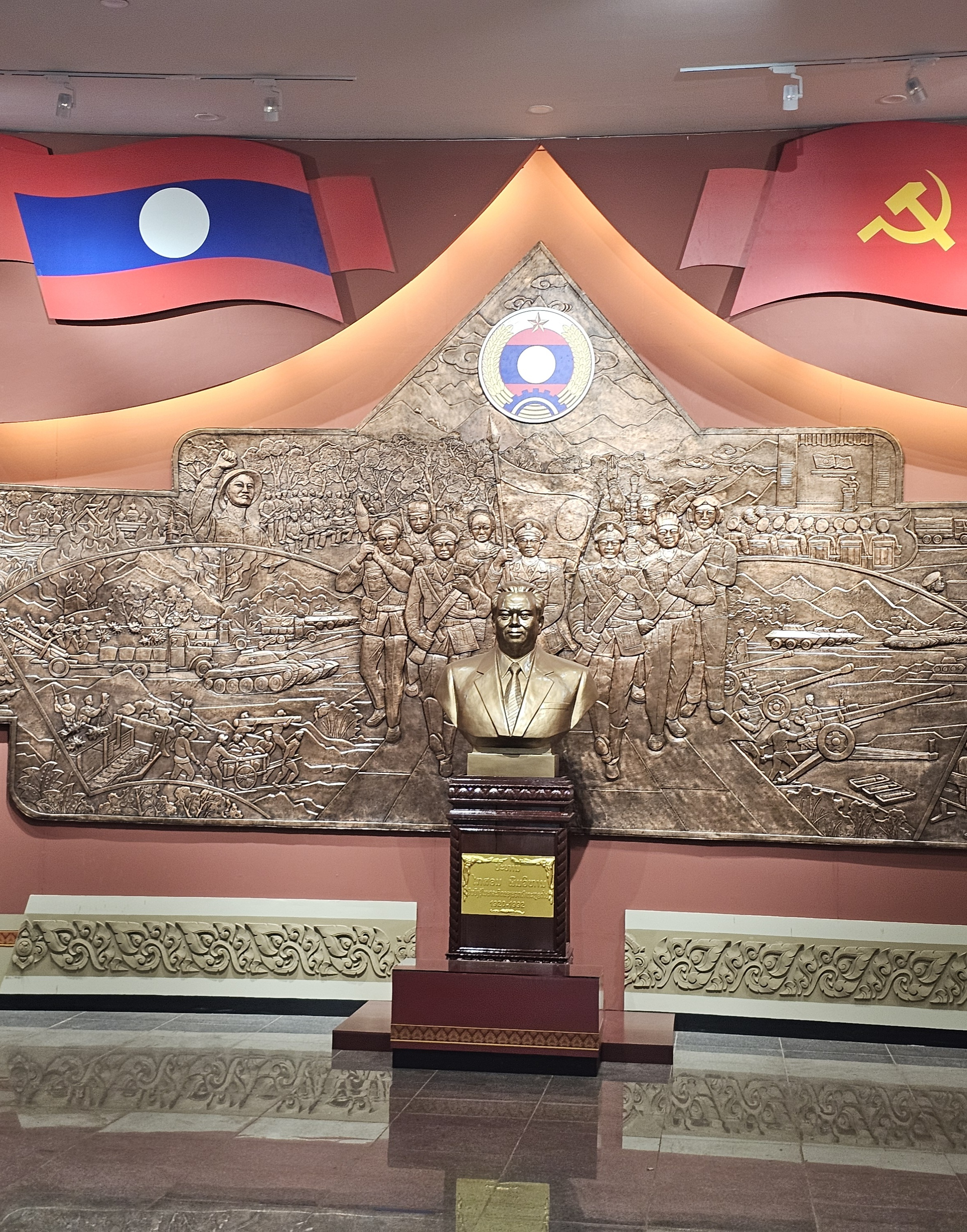
Bust at the Lao People's Army Historical Museum at Vientiane, Laos

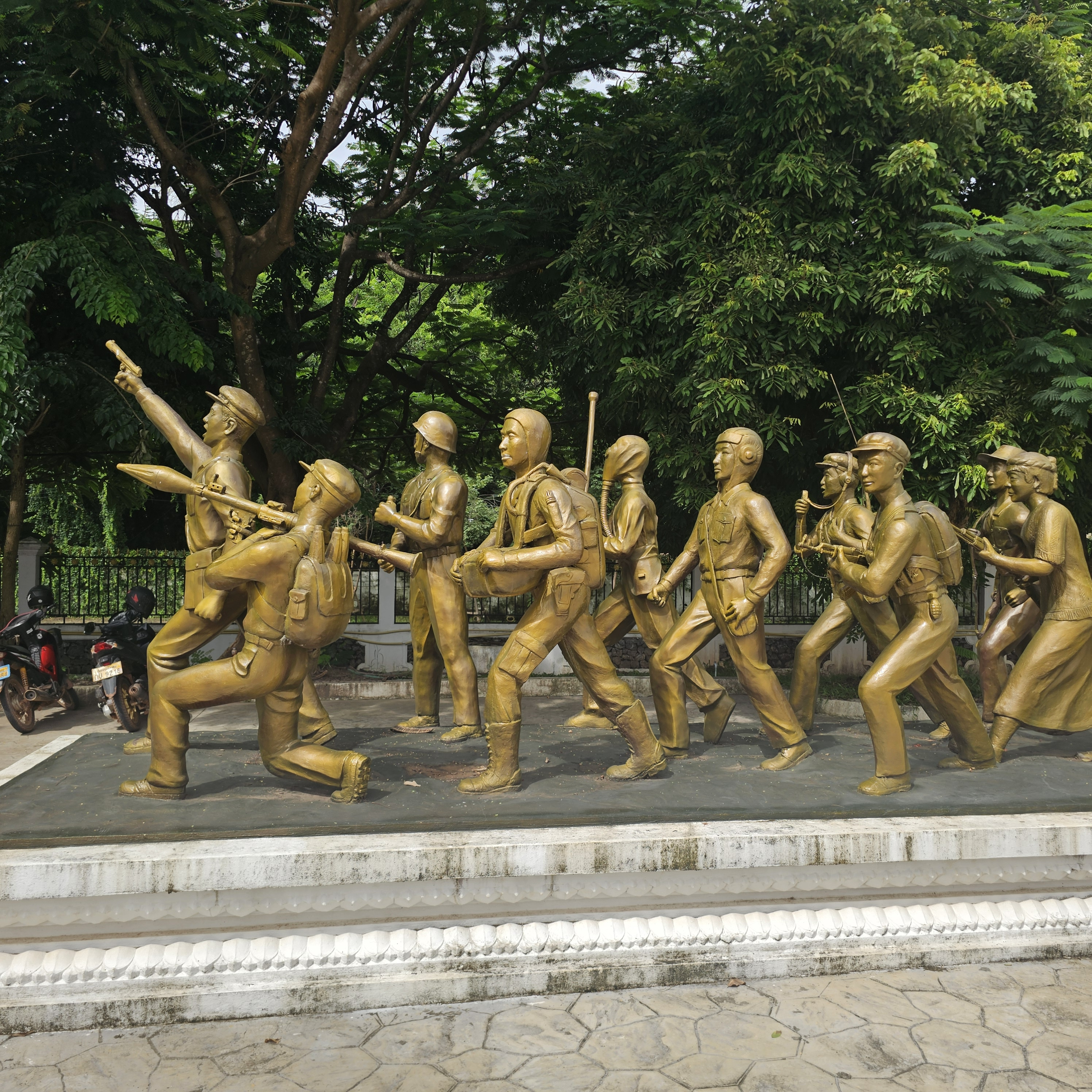
Display at the Lao People's Army Historical Museum at Vientiane, Laos

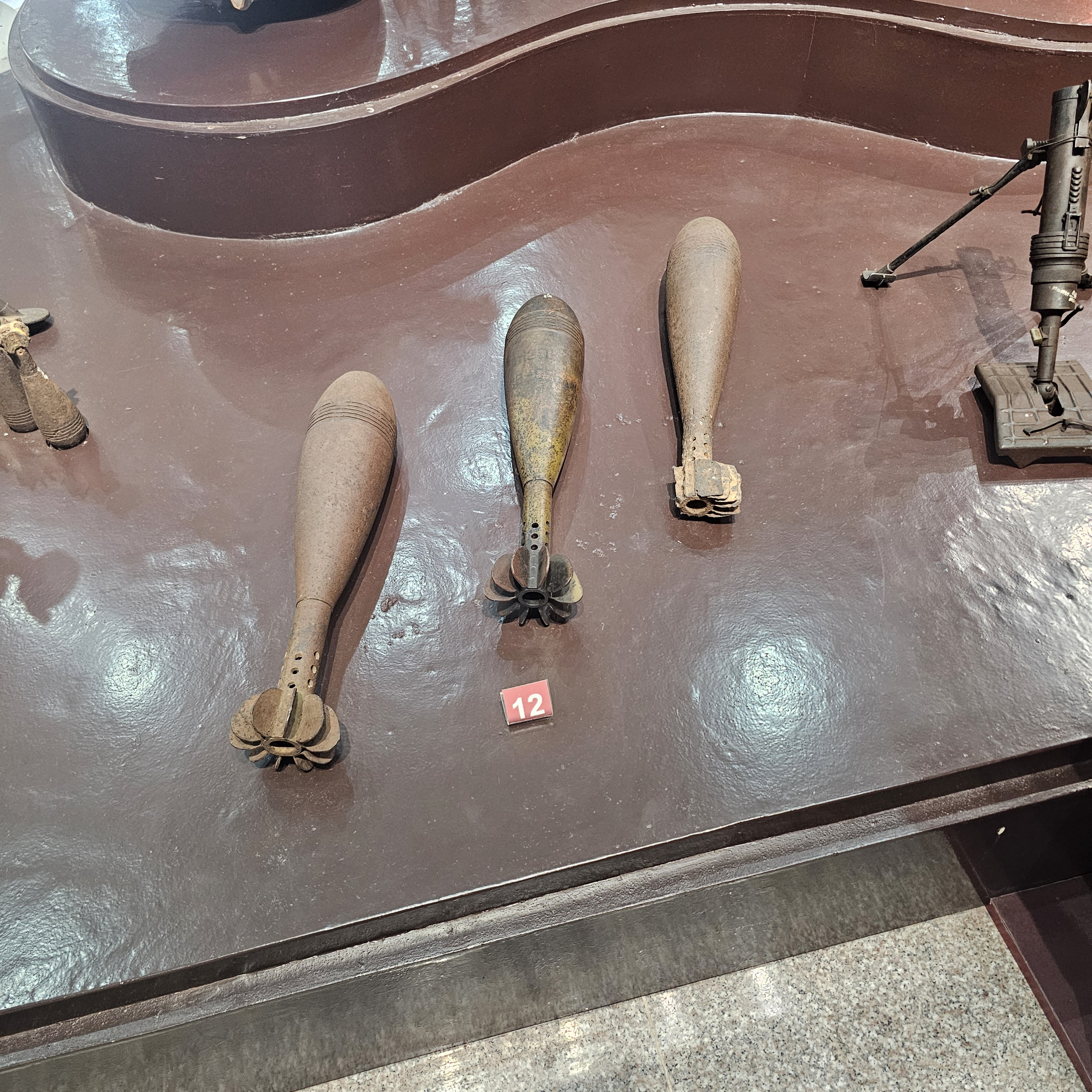
Ammunition display at the Lao People's Army Historical Museum at Vientiane, Laos

== Visitor information ==
The museum is located on Phomvihane Road inside the Ministry of National Defence compound. It is open to domestic and international visitors. Facilities include public restrooms, a courtyard, a souvenir shop, and exhibition halls. Access is typically by private taxi or tour operator.
