= Lao People's Armed Forces =

Combined military forces of Laos

- ກອງທັບປະຊາຊົນລາວ
- Emblem of Lao People's Armed Forces

- Flag of the Lao People's Armed Forces
- Founded: 20 January 1949; 77 years ago
- Service branches: Lao People's Army (includes Riverine Force); Lao People's Air Force; Self-Defense Militia Forces
- Headquarters: Vientiane

Leadership
- Governing body: Central Committee for National Defense and Security
- Commander in Chief: General Secretary Thongloun Sisoulith
- Minister of Defence: General Khamlieng Outhakaysone
- Chief of the General Staff: Lieutenant General Saichay Kommasith

Personnel
- Military age: 18–45 years old for compulsory military service (18 years old for those who graduated from senior high schools or vocational high schools)
- Conscription: minimum 18 months
- Active personnel: 30,000
- Reserve personnel: 100,000

Expenditure
- Budget: $39 million (2024)
- Percent of GDP: 0.23% (2024)

Industry
- Foreign suppliers: China; Hungary; Indonesia; Russia; Ukraine; Vietnam Historical: Czechoslovakia; Hungarian People's Republic; East Germany; Soviet Union

Related articles
- History: First Indochinese War; Vietnam War: Laotian Civil War; Cambodian Civil War; Communist insurgency in Thailand; Third Indochina War: Insurgency in Laos; Thai-Laotian Border War
- Ranks: Military ranks of Laos

The Lao People's Armed Forces (LPAF) (Lao: ກອງທັບປະຊາຊົນລາວ, romanised: Kongthap Paxaxon Lao) is the military of the Lao People's Democratic Republic and the military institution of the Lao People's Revolutionary Party.

== History ==
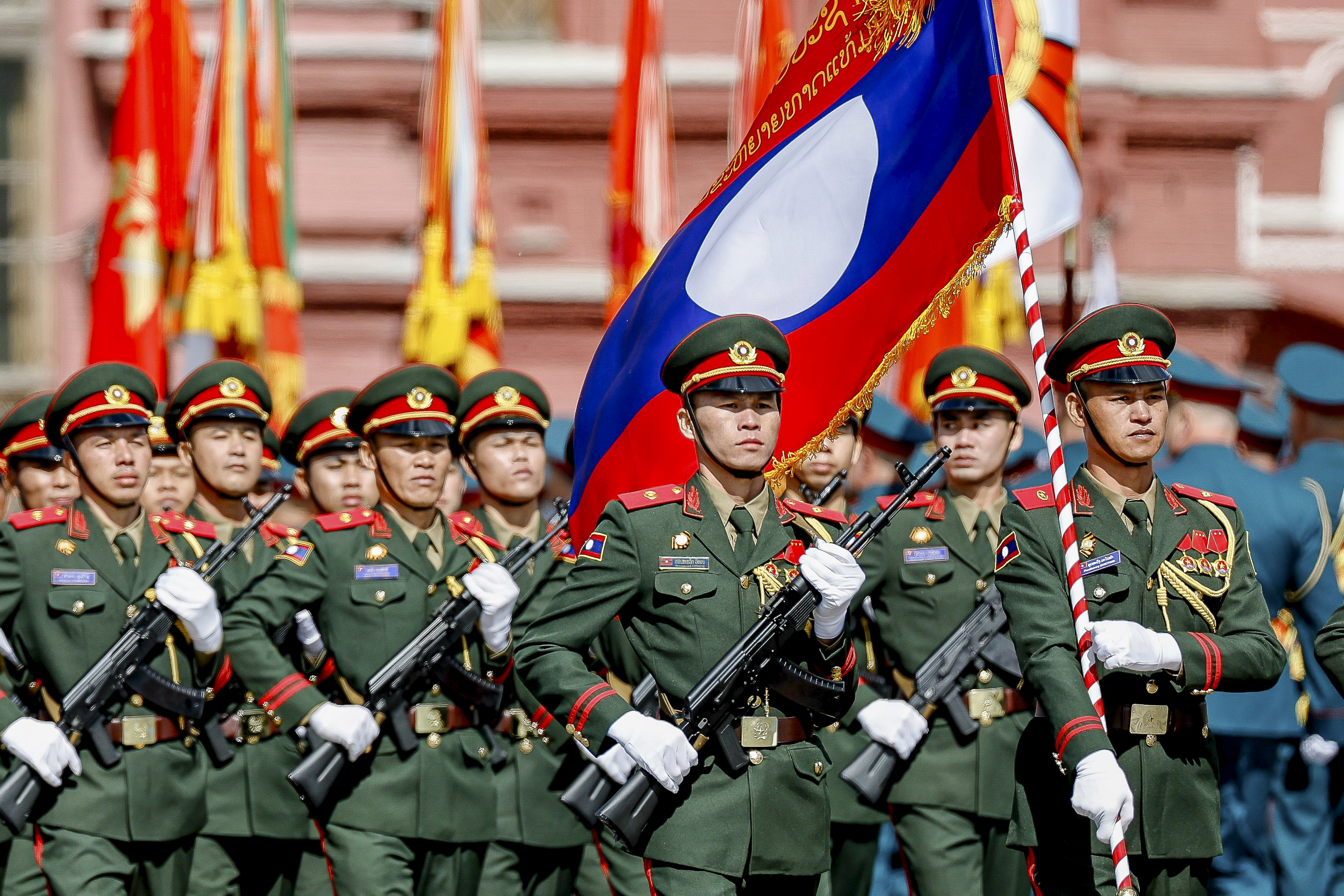
Lao People's Armed Forces on Red Square in Moscow during the Victory Day parade on 9 May 2025

According to some journalists, non-governmental organisations (NGOs), humanitarian and human rights organisations, the Lao People's Army has repeatedly engaged in egregious human rights violations and the practice of corruption in Laos. The LPAF and its military intelligence play a role in the arrest, imprisonment and torture of foreign prisoners in Vientiane's Phonthong Prison and the communist Lao gulag system where Australians Kerry and Kay Danes were imprisoned and where civic activist Sombath Somphone may be imprisoned following his arrest in December 2012.

On 17 May 2014, Defence Minister and Deputy Prime Minister Douangchay Phichit was killed in a plane crash, along with other officials. The officials were to participate in a ceremony to mark the liberation of the Plain of Jars from the former Royal Lao government forces. Their Russian-built Antonov AN 74-300 with 20 people on board crashed in Xiangkhouang Province.

== Organisation ==
The LPRP statute states that its political leadership over the military emanates from the LPRP Central Committee's Central Committee for National Defense and Security and is the highest decision-making institution regarding military and security affairs. The committee is chaired by the LPRP General Secretary, making the officeholder the commander-in-chief of the Armed Forces.

=== Branches ===
The LPAF has three known service branches:

- Lao People's Army (includes Riverine Force)
- Lao People's Air Force
- Self-Defense Militia Forces

=== Regional structure ===
- LPA Headquarters (Vientiane)
- Military Region 1
- Military Region 2
- Military Region 3
- Military Region 4
- Vientiane Capital Military Command

=== Education ===
- Kaysone Phomvihane National Defence Academy
- Viengxay Military Training School

== Equipment ==
=== Tanks, armoured vehicles and trucks ===
Photo	Model	Type	Origin	Quantity	Notes
Tanks
	T-72B1MS	Main battle tank	Russia	~50	
	T-55	Main battle tank	Soviet Union; Hungarian People's Republic	85	
	PT-76	Light tank	Soviet Union	25	30 were in service in 1996.
APC/IFV
	BTR-60PB	Armored personnel carrier	Soviet Union	70	Currently 70 are in service. BTR-60s have been seen in service as recently as January 2019
	BTR-152	Armored personnel carrier	Soviet Union	Unknown	
	BTR-40	Armored personnel carrier	Soviet Union	10	
	BRDM-2M	Armoured car	Soviet Union Russia	20	Upgraded BRDM-2M supplied by Russia in late 2018. At least 10 in service.
Light armoured vehicle/Light assault vehicle
	Dima DMT5070XFB	Armored personnel carrier	China	Unknown	
	Chinese Tiger 4x4	Infantry mobility vehicle	China	Unknown	
	CS/VN3 4x4	Infantry mobility vehicle	China	Unknown	
Truck/Utility
	KrAZ-6322	Truck	Ukraine	Unknown	
	Ural-4320	Medium truck	Soviet Union	Unknown	
	GAZ-3308	Medium truck	Russia	Unknown	
	FAW Jiefang 141	Medium truck	China	Unknown	
	Ural-43206	Light truck	Soviet Union	Unknown	
	GAZ-66	Platform truck	Soviet Union	Unknown	
	BAIC 4x4 vehicles	Military light utility vehicle	China	Unknown	
	UAZ-469	Military light utility vehicle	Soviet Union	Unknown	
	BJ2022JC	Military light utility vehicle	China	Unknown	
	PTS	Tracked amphibious transport	Soviet Union	Unknown	
	Shaanxi SX2190	Launched bridge	China	Unknown	
	Shaanxi SX2190	Floating bridge	China	Unknown	
Engineering and support vehicles
	XCMG backhoe loader	Engineering vehicle	China	Unknown	
	XCMG excavator	Engineering vehicle	China	Unknown	
	XCMG wheel loader	Engineering vehicle	China	Unknown	
	XCMG XJY240WQ	Engineering vehicle	China	Unknown	
	XCMG XJY240Z	Engineering vehicle	China	Unknown	

=== Artillery ===
Photo	Model	Type	Origin	Quantity	Notes
	Dongfeng CS/SS4	Self propelled mortar system	China		
	SR-5	Multiple rocket launcher	China	12	
	BM-21 Grad	122mm multiple rocket launcher	Soviet Union	32	Retired from parade in 2019
	BM-14	Multiple rocket launcher	Soviet Union	20	
	2S3 Akatsiya	152mm self-propelled howitzer	Soviet Union	Unknown	
	122-HL-70	122mm self-propelled howitzer	Laos	18	
	PCL-09	122mm self-propelled howitzer	China	12	
	M-30 122 mm howitzer	Towed howitzers and guns	Soviet Union	15	
	122 mm howitzer 2A18 (D-30)	Towed howitzers and guns	Soviet Union	20	
	130 mm towed field gun M1954 (M-46)	Towed howitzers and guns	Soviet Union		
	M114 155 mm howitzer	Towed howitzers and guns	United States	12	
	M101 howitzer	105mm (towed): M-101	United States	20	
	M116 howitzer	75mm (towed): M-116 pack	United States	10	

=== Air defence ===
Photo	Model	Type	Origin	Quantity	Notes
	S-125 Neva/Pechora	Short-range SAM system	Soviet Union	Unknown	
	9K35 Strela-10	Vehicle-mounted SAM system	Soviet Union	Unknown	
	Yitian anti air system	Surface-to-air missile	China	Unknown	
	ZSU-23-4 Shilka	Self-propelled anti-aircraft gun	Soviet Union	Unknown	
	Strela-2	Surface-to-air missile	Soviet Union	Unknown	Received 100 launchers from Soviet Union in the 80s
	37 mm automatic air defence gun M1939 (61-K)	Air defence gun	Soviet Union	Unknown	
	57 mm AZP S-60	Automatic anti-aircraft gun	Soviet Union	Unknown	
	ZPU	Auto anti-aircraft gun	Soviet Union	Unknown	
	ZU-23-2	Anti-aircraft gun	Soviet Union	Unknown	

=== Weapons ===
Photo	Model	Type	Caliber	Origin	Notes
	TT-33	Semi-automatic pistol	7.62×25mm Tokarev	Soviet Union	Standard service pistols for Laotian Armed Forces.
	PM	Semi-automatic pistol	9×18mm Makarov	Soviet Union	Standard service pistols for Laotian Armed Forces.
	G2	Semi-automatic pistol	9x19mm Parabellum	Indonesia	
	JS 9 mm	Bullpup Submachine gun	9×19mm Parabellum	China	
	Winchester Model 1200	Pump shotgun	12-gauge	United States	
	Vepr-12	Semi-automatic shotgun	12-gauge	Russia	Used by Laotian special forces.
	Simonov SKS	Semi-automatic rifle	7.62×39mm M43	Soviet Union	Limited use, used for ceremonial purpose only
	Mosin-Nagant	Bolt-action rifle	7.62×54mmR	Soviet Union	Limited use, in storage
	9A-91	Assault rifle, Carbine	9x39mm	Russia	Used by Laotian special forces.
	AKM AKMS	Assault rifle	7.62×39mm	Soviet Union	Standard service rifles for Laotian Armed Forces, including police officer and Lao People's army. To be replaced by AK-74 and AK-12.
	AK-74	Assault rifle	5.45x39mm	Soviet Union	Seen in the hands of Laotian troops during Lao National Day military parade on 2 December 2025.
	AK-12	Assault rifle	5.45x39mm	Russia	Used by Laotian special forces.
	QBZ-95	Bullpup Assault rifle	5.8×42mm DBP87 5.56×45mm NATO	China	Used by Laotian Special Forces and Special Police Forces.
	Type 56	Assault rifle	7.62×39mm	China	
	Type 81	Assault rifle	7.62×39mm	China	
	AMD-65	Assault rifle	7.62×39mm	Hungarian People's Republic	
	Pindad SS1	Assault rifle	5.56×45mm NATO	Indonesia	In 2014, Laos imported 35 SS1 V2s and SS1 V4s.
	Pindad SS2	Assault rifle	5.56×45mm NATO	Indonesia	
	M16A2	Assault rifle	5.56×45mm NATO	United States	
	IWI Galil ACE	Assault rifle	7.62×39 mm	Israel; Vietnam	Laos received Vietnamese-made Galil ACEs in January 2019.
	RPD	Light machine gun	7.62×39mm	Soviet Union	
	PK machine gun	General-purpose machine gun	7.62×54mmR	Soviet Union	
	M60 machine gun	General-purpose machine gun	7.62×51mm NATO	United States	
	KPV heavy machine gun	Heavy machine gun	14.5×114mm	Soviet Union	
	DShK	Heavy machine gun	12.7×108mm	Soviet Union	
	Dragunov SVD	Designated marksman rifle, Sniper rifle	7.62×54mmR	Soviet Union	
	RPG-7	Rocket-propelled grenade	40mm	Soviet Union	
	RPG-2	Rocket-propelled grenade	40mm	Soviet Union	

=== Mortars ===
- 81mm
- 82mm
- 120mm
- Soviet Union M1938 mortar
- Soviet Union 120mm: M-43
- United States M2 4.2 inch mortar

== See also ==
- Lao People's Liberation Army Air Force
- Military ranks of the Lao People's Armed Forces
