= Kerry and Kay Danes =

Australian husband-and-wife detained in Laos

- Born: Kerry Arthur Danes; 21 October 1958 (age 68); Longreach, Queensland
- Occupations: Security manager, soldier
- Spouse(s): Kay Frances Danes (same convictions and pardon as husband)
- Status: Arbitrary Detainment in Laos; 23 December 2000; Released 6 October 2001; Pardoned 6 November 2001 (convictions absolved)
- Convictions: Embezzlement, tax evasion and destruction of evidence. (June 2001) (Laos)
- Penalty: 7 years prison (2000-07); 10 months served (2000-01) $AUD1.1 million fines and compensation by formal agreement to be paid in instalments to the Laos government

Kerry Arthur Danes and his wife Kay Frances Danes (née Stewart) were employed as security managers in 1999 for a British-owned security company Jardine Securicor in Laos.

On 23 December 2000, Kerry and Kay Danes were arrested and later convicted of embezzlement, tax evasion and destruction of evidence. They were ordered to pay fines and compensation of $AUD1.1 million. Their appeal to the Supreme Court of Laos was dismissed before it was heard. The case provoked outrage in Australia.

Upon the conclusion of all legal proceedings, the Australian government intervened on their behalf. Australian Prime Minister John Howard and the former governor-general Sir William Deane, and Foreign Affairs Minister Alexander Downer made direct appeals to the Laos Government for their release.

The pair signed a formal agreement to pay their fines by instalments, and a presidential pardon was granted on 6 November 2001, which enabled their return to Australia.

== Kerry Danes ==
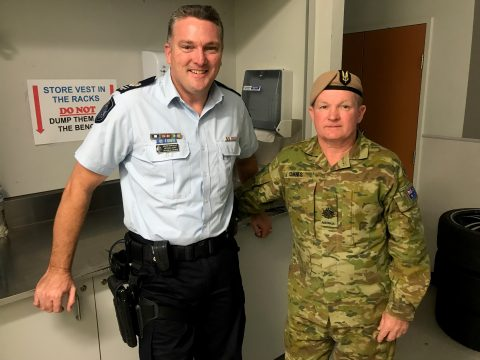
Senior Sergeant Michael Leafe and Warrant Officer Class One Kerry Danes 2018

Kerry Arthur Danes was born in 1958 at Longreach, Queensland and joined the Australian Army in August 1976 at age 17. He took extended leave without pay in 1998 (aged 40) to work in Laos as a security managing Director. His wife, Kay, and their three pre-teen children followed. After three years away, Danes returned to Australia in late 2001 (aged 43) and resumed paid military service. In 2018, he reached the compulsory retirement age of 60 for Australian Defence Force (ADF) personnel, and was serving part-time with the Army Reserve as at December that year. According to Danes, his overseas military deployments included Iraq, Kuwait, East-Timor and Afghanistan, and was appointed to a diplomatic posting to the Kingdom of Saudi Arabia as the Defence Administrative Assistant (DAA) to the Australian Defence Attache from 2012 to 2015 under a Top Secret Positive Vetting Clearance (TSPV). The Defence section at the Australian Embassy in Riyadh manages bilateral defence relations, focusing on security, training, and cooperation across Saudi Arabia, Bahrain, Oman and Yemen. The Defence Attaché (DA) and DAA work to advance Australian national interests, strengthen military partnerships, and support regional security, including counter-terrorism efforts.

Danes' online professional profile describes him as a Director of a private security company (with his wife), and "a specialist in risk identification and crisis management, governance, safety and business continuity planning" since January 2002. Prior to that, Danes managed Lao Securicor, a company that provided a security guard for the Vientiane office of the country's biggest sapphire mine, Gem Mining Lao (GML).

== Gem Mining Lao ==
=== Background ===
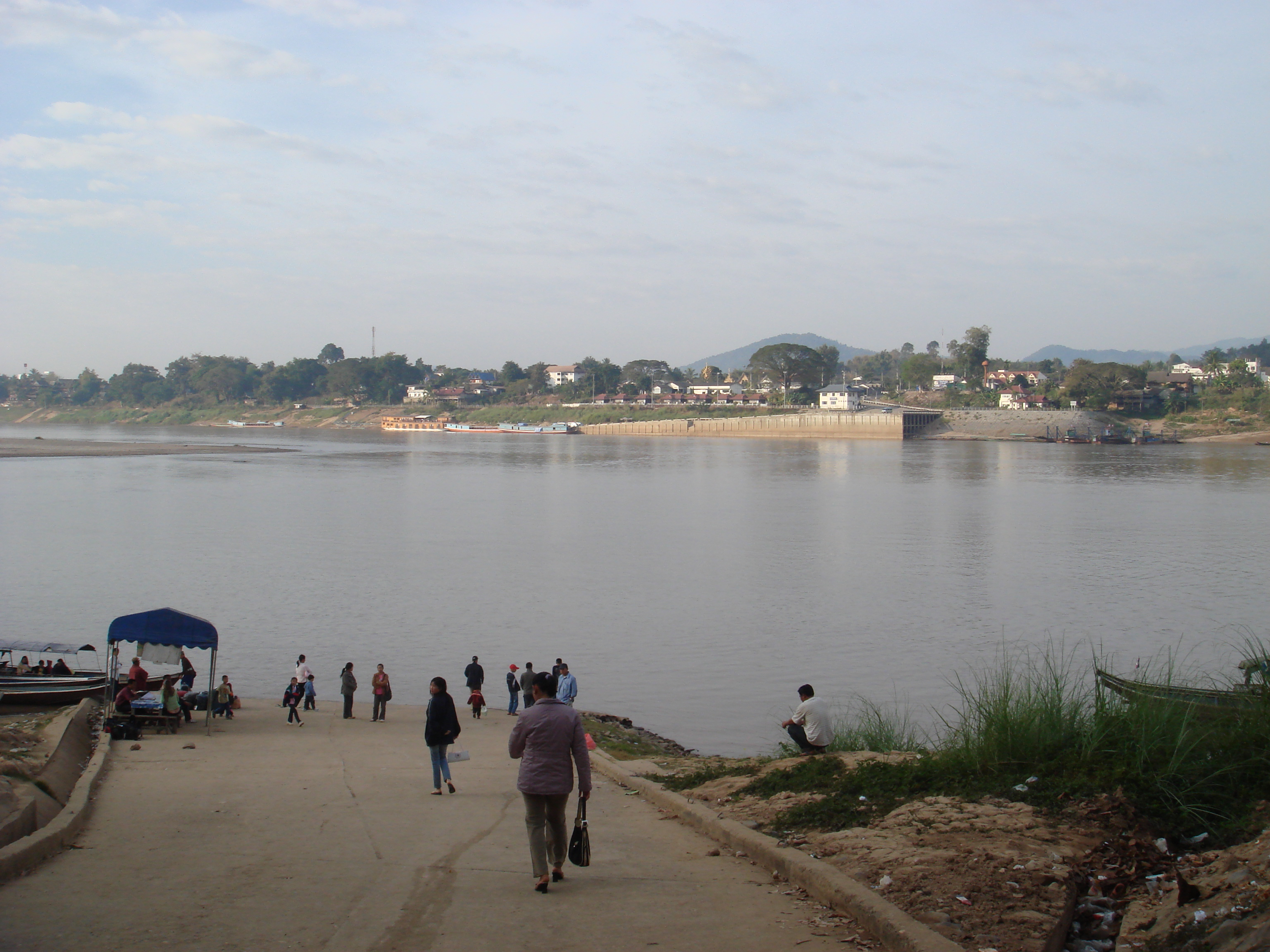
Huay Xai, Laos border crossing to Thailand

In 1994, Bjarne (Bernie) Jeppesen (Denmark) and his wife Julie Bruns (New Zealand) founded Gem Mining Lao PDR (GML) with Lao-born American, Somkhit Vilavong. They were granted a fifteen-year concession from the Lao government to mine at Huay Xai, a small city located in the north, which lies on the east of the Mekong just over the river border from Chiang Khong, Thailand near the Golden Triangle. In May 2000, Jeppesen and his wife fled Laos amidst charges of embezzlement. The Lao Government terminated GML's mining concession and then nationalised GML's sapphire mines. Jeppesen's caretakers, Kerry and Kay Danes, were arrested later the same year.

=== Kerry and Kay Danes ===
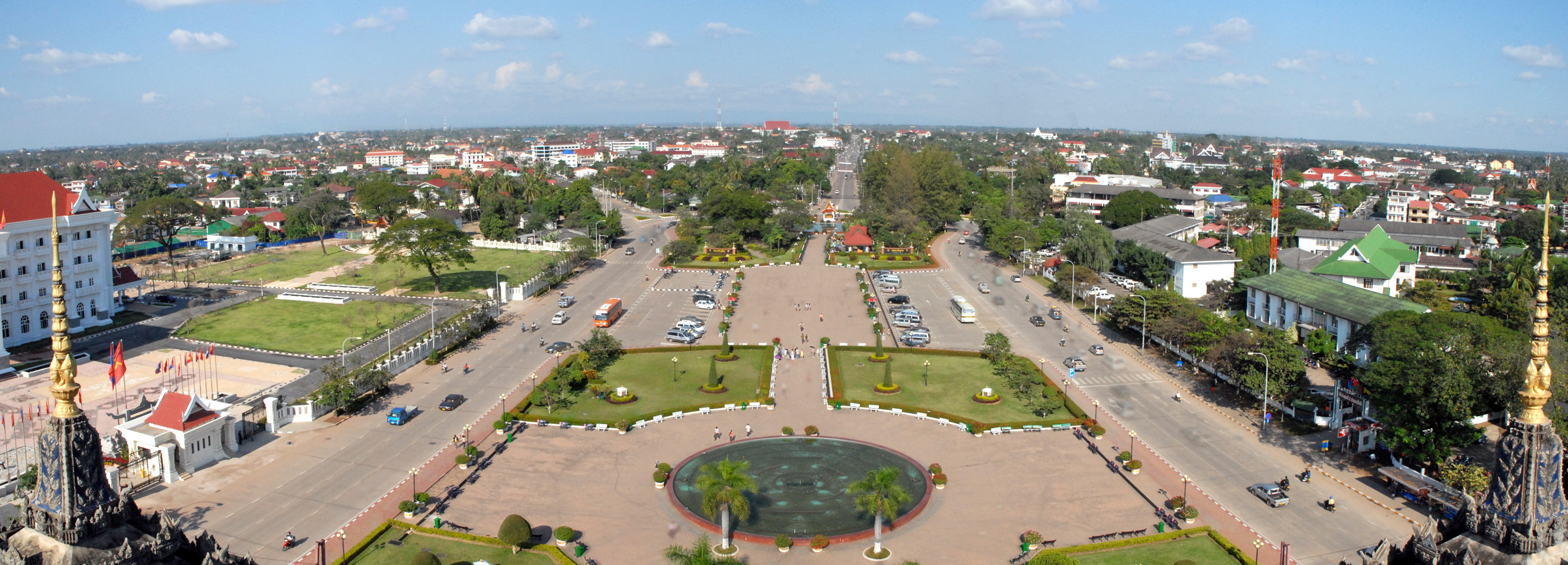
View of Vientiane from Patuxai

By the end of 2000, Kerry Danes, a soldier on extended leave from the Australian Army, had been living for two years in the capital city Vientiane. According to American gem expert Richard W. Hughes, Danes was general manager of Lao Securicor (a subsidiary of Jardine Matheson Holdings Limited), a company that provided a security guard for the Vientiane office of the country's biggest sapphire mine, Gem Mining Lao (GML). Amidst allegations of missing gems, the registered owners and founders/executives of GML had been prohibited from leaving Laos. Security contractor Kerry Danes formally agreed to handle all affairs for GML prior to two of their founders fleeing Laos on 28 May 2000 to Bangkok, Thailand (and later Denmark). More than 450 Laotian employees of GML lost their jobs. The Lao government later convicted the fugitive GML pair (who never returned) in absentia for theft and misappropriations related to GML, and sentenced them to twenty years imprisonment. According to Bernie Jeppesen (GML), Danes' subsequent problem resulted from his association with Gem Mining Lao.

==== Detainment ====
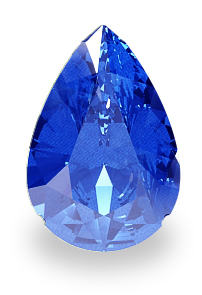
Picture of a blue sapphire (for illustration purposes only)

Kerry Danes formally agreed to handle all affairs for GML when two of its founders, Jeppeson and Bruns, unlawfully fled Laos to Thailand on 28 May 2000. Danes also co-signed a letter from Jeppesen accusing members of the Lao government of corruption. Two months after the departure of Jeppeson and Bruns, quantities of Huay Sai sapphires allegedly appeared at Chanthaburi gem markets in Thailand. Danes was the managing director of Lao Securicor, a security company that "provided a security guard for GML's Vientiane office." In December 1999, the Lao government had ordered GML to suspend exports of all raw and semi-finished sapphire products.

On 23 December 2000, Kerry Danes (aged 42) was seized in his Vientiane office by Lao secret police on suspicion of involvement in the theft of over $US6 million worth of sapphires and cash from a gem mine that he had been hired to secure. Under Lao law, suspects could be held for up to twelve months before charges were laid. GML fugitive Bernie Jeppesen attributed Danes' problem to his association with Gem Mining Lao.

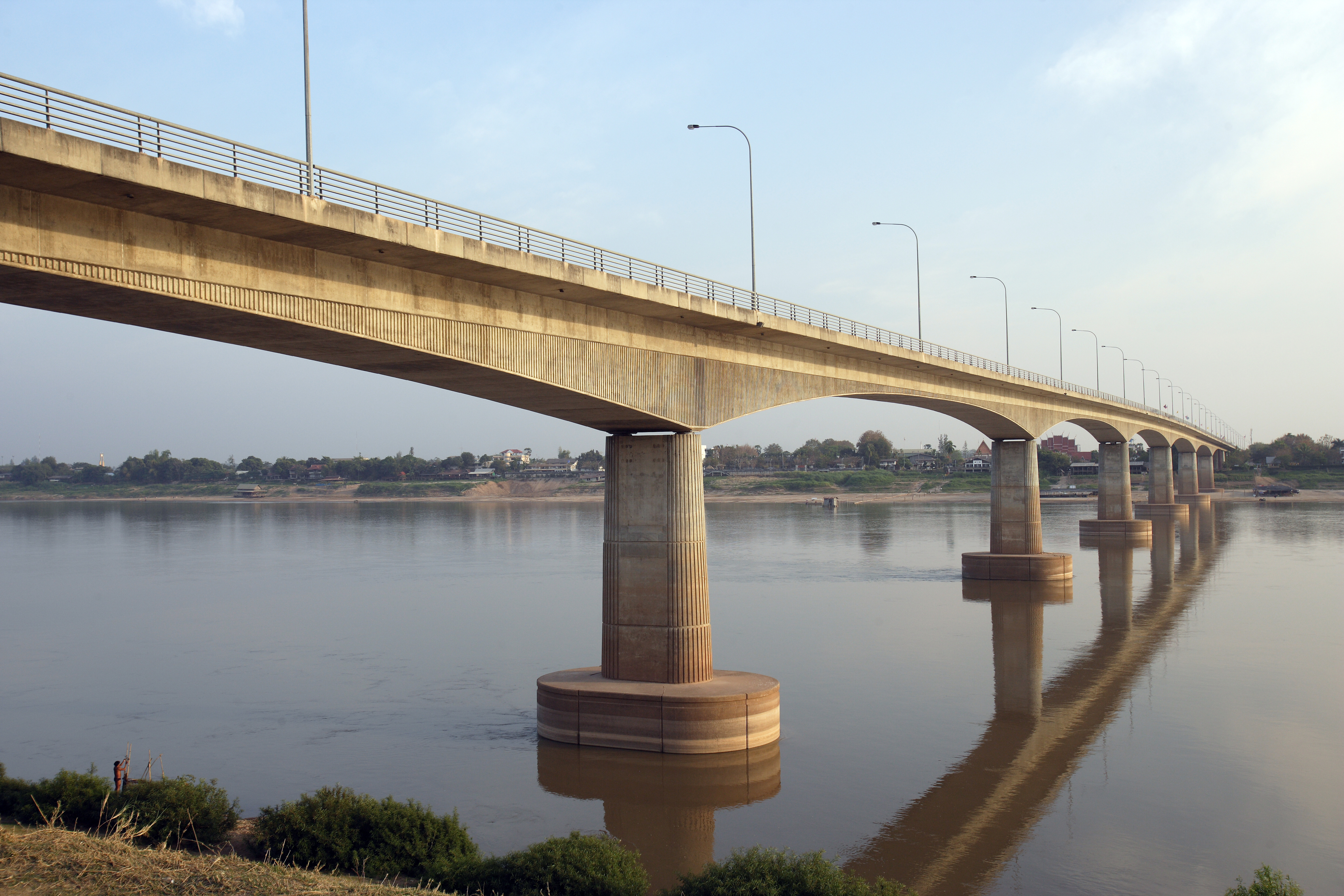
Thai–Lao Friendship Bridge, border crossing near Vientiane

Danes' wife, Kay (aged 33), worked as an office manager for Lao Securicor security company, which contracted to GML. She tried to flee the country on foot the same day with two of their three children (the third child, aged 14, was not in Laos), but was detained with $US52,700 cash at the nearby Laos-Thailand border by the head of Lao secret police. Under Lao law, suspects could be held for up to twelve months before charges were laid. The children aged 11 and 7 were released and with the aid of Australian consular staff, returned to Australia two days later on 25 December 2000 to stay with their grandparents in Brisbane. Kerry and Kay Danes were incarcerated in separate sections of mixed-sex Phonthong Prison, known as the 'Foreigners Prison', near Vientiane. On Christmas Day, Kay reportedly told her mother by mobile phone: "Mum, I think by tomorrow I'll be dead."

==== Allegations ====
In May 2001, the Danes' Sydney-based lawyer said Kay's psychological condition was deteriorating, and she had developed a bad toothache in need of treatment. However, Kerry was physically and mentally strong. The case against the Danes centred on the transfer of a small fortune ($AUD200,000) to a Lao bank account in Kay Danes' name. The transfer occurred about the time authorities alleged that finished and rough-cut sapphires worth millions of dollars disappeared from the office of a mining company that Danes provided security for. Soon after the Danes were detained, GML Director Bjarne Jeppesen claimed that two dubious Australian characters (one notorious for money laundering and the other a disbarred lawyer) known as associates of murdered Melbourne lawyer/conman Max Green) were the main accusers against the Danes.

==== Conviction ====
On 28 June 2001, a Lao court convicted both Kerry and Kay Danes of embezzlement, tax evasion and destruction of evidence, sentenced each to seven years imprisonment, and ordered them to pay fines and compensation of $AUD1.1 million. The Australian government intervened on their behalf, and the Danes had served less than a total of ten months in prison when provisionally released on 6 October 2001. Not yet permitted to leave the country, the Danes decamped at the residence of Australian ambassador to Laos, Jonathan Thwaites. Laos authorities returned cash seized from Kay Danes and bank account funds of almost $200,000 ordered frozen at the time of the Danes' arrest. However, it was expected that such monies would be used to pay fines and compensation. According to reports produced by the FBI, Interpol and the Australian Federal Police, no convictions are recorded against Kay Danes.

==== Lao Presidential pardon ====
In large part due to Laos's strong ties with Australia, coupled with the fact that Kerry Danes was still enlisted as a full-time non-commissioned officer in the Australian Defence Force, the pair received a formal presidential pardon on 6 November 2001, which absolved them of their convictions. According to Australian Minister for Foreign Affairs Alexander Downer, the Danes were advised they were free to leave Laos and welcome to return at any time if they wished. The couple flew back to Australia, and Kerry Danes returned to military service.

==== Fines ====
As a condition of release in October 2001, the Danes agreed to pay the June 2001 court-ordered $AUD1.1 million in fines and compensation in four equal instalments. When told that the Lao government was considering court action for non-payment in August 2002, Kay Danes argued on ABC Local Radio that the agreement was simply a diplomatic face-saving exercise, and she felt that the Australian government should intervene on their behalf again because she would be "executed" if forced to return to Laos. The Australian Foreign Minister's press secretary advised that the issue was a private legal matter between the Laos government and the Danes. Australia was obligated to pass on any court order issued in Laos, however no official documents had been received by the Department of Foreign Affairs and Trade.

==== Film ====
In 2013, the producers of The Bodhi Tree film considered buying an option on Kay Danes' 2009 memoir Standing Ground: An Imprisoned Couple's Struggle for Justice Against a Communist Regime but later decided to base the film on two novels by British journalist Paul Conroy. The Bodhi Tree concentrates on the main story of lawyer Max Green, Australia's biggest legal fraudster, who embezzled millions of dollars and was later murdered in Cambodia. The smaller supporting story fictionalises the Danes in Laos.

== Kay Danes ==
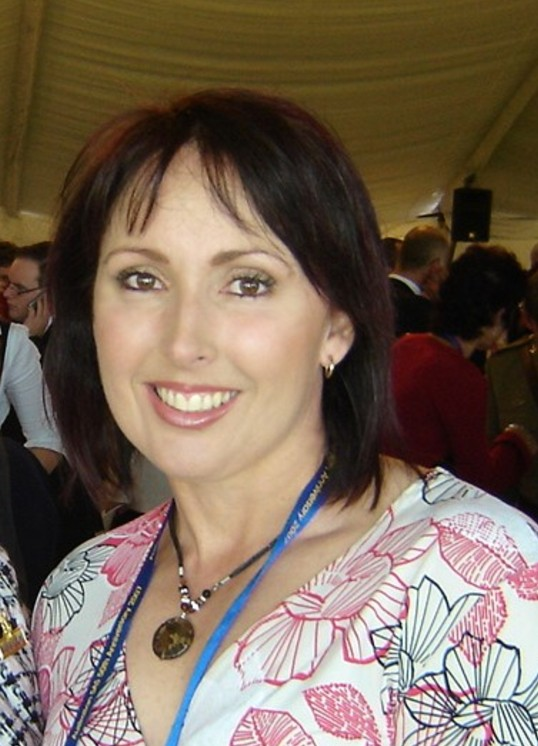
Kay Danes (2007)

Kay Frances Stewart was born in 1967 at Wynnum, Queensland. She married Australian soldier Kerry Danes and together they had three children, with the first being born in 1986 when Kay was either 18 or 19. After her husband took a civilian job twelve years later in Laos, Kay Danes followed and was engaged as his office manager. In her memoirs, Danes refers to herself as an adrenaline junkie and regarded Laos as an exciting adventure up until being jailed in December 2000.

Danes' online professional profile describes her as a Business Development & Marketing Director for a private security company (with her husband) since January 2002. Her "specialities include administration, project management, research and development". Prior to that, she was an office manager in Laos.

=== Thailand ===
At the start of Chapter 1 of her third memoir Families Behind Bars: Stories of Injustice, Endurance and Hope (2008), Kay Danes writes that she was also a director of a bodyguard company based in Thailand at the time she was detained in Laos in 2000. She claims to have hired out former elite military and police officers. Danes also asserts that she had access to the King of Thailand's own personal bodyguards, and she would sometimes provide close protection services to employers of her husband's security company in Laos. Opposite page 96 of her fourth memoir Standing Ground: An Imprisoned Couple's Struggle for Justice Against a Communist Regime (2009), Danes captions a picture of herself at Siem Reap airport on a covert surveillance assignment in 2000. Separately, Kay Danes' mother writes on page 43 of Families Behind Bars that Kay called her in Australia on Christmas Day 2000 on Kerry Danes' mobile phone after secretly concealing it during her first two days of imprisonment in Laos.

=== Laos activism ===
==== Allegations ====
After the Australian government successfully negotiated a Lao presidential pardon in 2001 on their behalf, Kerry and Kay Danes returned to Australia with their monies intact. Kerry resumed Australian military service. Kay found herself "on a slippery slide of prescribed medications" for quite a few years. The Danes reportedly experienced and witnessed daily incidents of torture and ill-treatment by Laotian authorities. In 2002, the Australian government declined to intervene when it was suggested that the Laos government was considering court action for non-payment of the $AUD1.1 million in fines and compensation that the Danes had agreed to pay by instalments when their presidential pardon was negotiated. Affected with post-traumatic stress disorder and chronic depression, Kay Danes released her first memoir Deliver Us From Evil: Bad Things Do Happen to Good People in 2002.

==== Legitimacy ====
Danes was invited to speak the same year at the U.S. Congressional Forum on Laos in the United States House of Representatives and the Library of Congress, Washington, D.C. Having found an appreciative audience, she testified on numerous occasions on Capitol Hill, and spoke at the National Press Club about human rights violations and the plight of political and foreign prisoners held in Laos.

The sense of injustice can be a powerful motivational condition, causing people to take action not just to defend themselves but also others who they perceive to be unfairly treated. Danes continued writing and two more memoirs were released in 2006 and 2008. Danes testified in 2009 and 2011 at special sessions of the U.S. Congressional Forum on Laos. Kay provided information about the Vientiane prison that she and husband Kerry were released from in 2001. Such information was considered in the context of the 2007 imprisonment of three missing Hmong-Americans In 2009, Danes published her fourth Lao memoir Standing Ground: An Imprisoned Couple's Struggle for Justice Against a Communist Regime.

==== Publications ====
Kay Danes has published several memoirs based on her own personal experiences and observations. Her second memoir Nightmare in Laos : The True Story of a Woman Imprisoned in a Communist Gulag.Kay Danes has mentioned suffering from diagnosed Post Traumatic Stress Disorder (PTSD).

===== Memoirs =====
- Danes, Kay (2002). Deliver Us From Evil : Bad Things Do Happen to Good People. North Melbourne, Victoria: Crown Content. ISBN 1-74095-025-9.
- Danes, Kay (2006). Nightmare in Laos : The True Story of a Woman Imprisoned in a Communist Gulag. Ireland: Maverick House Publishers. ISBN 978-1-905379-08-8.
- Danes, Kay (2008). Families Behind Bars: Stories of Injustice, Endurance and Hope. Australia: New Holland Publishers. ISBN 978-1-74110-676-3.
- Danes, Kay (2009). Standing Ground: An Imprisoned Couple's Struggle for Justice Against a Communist Regime. Australia: New Holland. ISBN 978-1-74110-757-9.
- Danes, Kay (2010). Beneath the Pale Blue Burqa : One Woman's Journey Through Taliban Strongholds. Australia: Big Sky Publishing. ISBN 978-1-92527-505-6.

=== Afghanistan ===
In October / November 2008, while Warrant Officer Kerry Danes was on a tour of duty with the Australian Army, his wife Kay took the opportunity to visit Afghanistan from Australia and travel in a Toyota Hiace van through war-torn countryside as part of a small group of five mixed-gender Rotarians under United States Marine Corps protection. In 2009, Kay Danes was named Citizen of the Year in her hometown. The following year, she published her fifth memoir Beneath the Pale Blue Burqa: One Woman's Journey Through Taliban Strongholds. Chapter 1 names three women and two men on an organised two-week road trip with an Afghan driver. On page 38, Kay Danes refers to herself as an adrenaline junkie. In the Acknowledgements, Danes writes how honoured she is being able to risk both life and limb on this adventure.

=== Saudi Arabia ===
In 2011, Kay Danes moved to Saudi Arabia when husband Kerry was deployed there with the Australian Defence Force. The following year, Kay was employed by the Australian government as an administrative assistant at its embassy in Riyadh. In 2012, she was named State Finalist for Australian of the Year: an award conferred on an Australian citizen by the National Australia Day Council, a not-for-profit Australian Government owned social enterprise.

=== Australia ===
In 2014, Kay Frances Danes was awarded the Medal of the Order of Australia (OAM) for social justice and human rights work. The same year, she left the workforce in Saudi Arabia to complete a Master of Human Rights degree online through Curtin University (WA), and to also take advantage of the travel opportunities of the Middle East. Danes relocated to Australia in January 2015 and commenced research for a PhD (Law and Justice) two years later at Southern Cross University (SCU), City of Gold Coast, Queensland. Her thesis "Exploring the evolving professionalisation of the Australian humanitarian sector" earned her a doctorate in 2020.

== See also ==
- List of Australians imprisoned or executed abroad
- Punishment in Laos
