= Samantha Orobator =

Nigerian-English drug smuggler

- Born: Nigeria
- Citizenship: United Kingdom
- Children: 1
- Status: Released, remains subject to a life sentence
- Criminal charges: Drug smuggling
- Penalty: Life in prison

Details
- Date: August 2008
- Country: Laos
- Location: Wattay International Airport
- Imprisoned at: Phonthong Prison (also known as "Foreigners Prison"), near Vientiane, Laos

Samantha Orobator is a British drug trafficker whose trial had international repercussions. She was arrested in Laos in August 2008, found guilty and sentence to for life to Phonthong Prison. Her case attracted popular media attention because she was found to be pregnant after being taken to prison.

== Drug incidence ==
In August 2008, Samantha Orobator was arrested in Laos with 680 grams of heroin and was detained at Phonthong Prison. In June 2009, under Laotian law that prescribes the death penalty for drug smuggling, Samantha was sentenced to life imprisonment after a three-hour trial. Her lawyers appealed the sentence on the grounds that she was found to be pregnant four months after detention. She was repatriated to the UK in August 2009 to serve her sentence in a UK prison. In January 2010, the High Court set a minimum time to serve of 18 months imprisonment before the English and Welsh Parole Board can consider her release. The 18 month minimum period was deemed appropriate by Lord Justice Dyson and Mr Justice Tugendhat in line with the normal sentencing arrangements for drug offences. However, Samantha Orobator remains subject to a life licence and can be recalled to custody at any point for the rest of her natural life. The court also ruled that she had not suffered a "flagrant denial of justice".

== See also ==
- Phonthong Prison
