= Human rights in Laos =

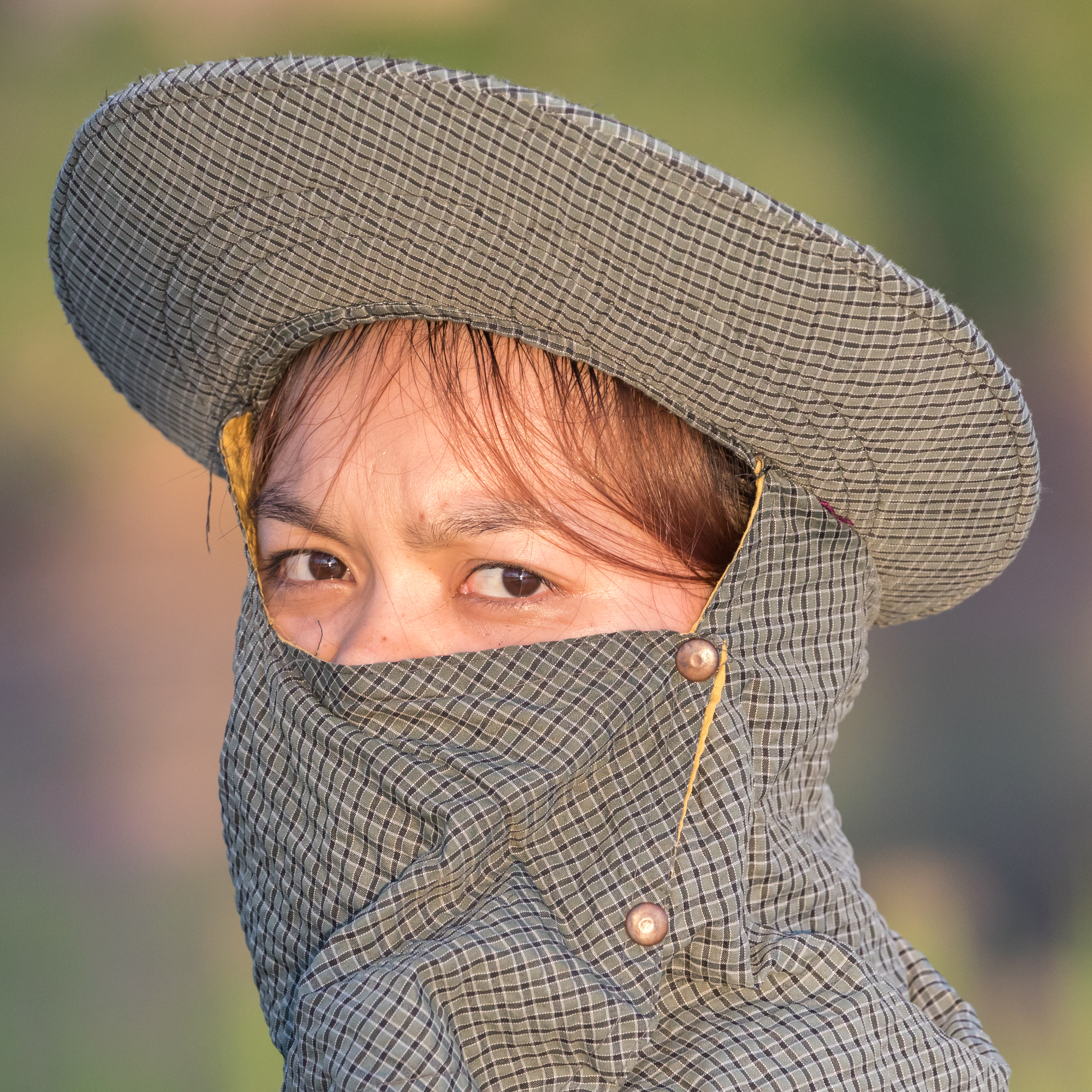
Portrait of a woman planting the rice in the paddy fields of Don Det, Si Phan Don, Southern Laos

Amnesty International, The Centre for Public Policy Analysis, the United League for Democracy in Laos, Human Rights Watch, the Lao Human Rights Council and other non-governmental organizations (NGO)s have raised concerns about the ratification record of the Laos Government on human rights standards and its lack of cooperation with the UN human rights mechanisms and legislative measures which impact on human rights. They have raised concerns in relation to disappeared civic activist Sombath Somphone, and jailed and tortured political and religious dissidents, military attacks on unarmed civilians, and the lack of freedom of expression, torture, poor prison conditions, restrictions on freedom of religions, protection of refugees and asylum-seekers, extrajudicial killing and rape by the Lao People's Army and security forces and the improper use of the death penalty. Some officials and police have facilitated and profited from sex trafficking in Laos.

The purported policy objectives of both the Government of Laos and international donors remain focused toward achieving sustainable economic growth and poverty reduction, and restrictions on freedom of expression and association are a source of concern. The barring of independent human rights monitors makes an exact appraisal of the situation impossible. In particular, the situation for groups of ethnic Hmong hiding in the jungle leads to a steady stream of people taking refuge in neighboring Thailand. No executions have been reported since 1989.

== Official Lao position on human rights ==
Officially, and in theory, the Constitution that was promulgated in 1991 under the Marxist-Leninist government contains safeguards for human rights. For example, in Article 8 it states that Laos is a multiethnic state and is committed to equality between ethnic groups. The Constitution has provisions for gender equality and freedom of religion, for freedom of speech, press and assembly.

On 25 September 2009, Laos ratified the International Covenant on Civil and Political Rights, 9 years after signing the treaty.

According to Amnesty International, and Human Rights Watch, the reality in Laos is quite different — the Marxist government generally does not abide by its own Constitution. The Lao government in Vientiane has been condemned by the US Congress, United Nations Committee on Racial Discrimination, and European Parliament.

== Individual cases ==
There are individual cases of human rights violations in Laos according to NGOs and human rights advocates. For example, 2 former government officials whose imprisonment for expressing dissident political views had been publicized by international human rights groups were released in October 2004. A third dissident sentenced along with them died in prison in 1998. The 3 men had been arrested in 1990 for expressing concern about government policies and advocating economic and political reforms.

In October 1999, 30 people were arrested for attempting to display posters calling for peaceful economic, political and social change in Laos. 5 of them were arrested and subsequently sentenced to up to 10 years imprisonment on charges of treason. 1 has since died due to his treatment by prison guards, while 1 has been released. The surviving 3 men should have been released by October 2009.

== Hmong conflict and attacks on unarmed Hmong civilians ==
The government of Laos has been accused of committing genocide against that country's Hmong ethnic minority. Some Hmong groups fought as CIA-backed units on the Royalist side in the Laos civil war.

As many as 200,000 Hmong went into exile in Thailand, with some ending up in the U.S. A number of Hmong fighters hid out in mountains in Xiangkhouang Province for years, with a remnant emerging from the jungle in 2003.

According to US NGO The Centre for Public Policy Analysis, Christian and independent Buddhist and animist believers were being persecuted.

=== Hmong refugees and forced repatriation ===
After talks with the UNHCR and the Thai government, Laos agreed to repatriate the 60,000 Lao refugees living in Thailand, including some thousand Hmong people. Pressure to resettle the refugees grew as the Thai government worked to close its remaining refugee camps. While some Hmong people returned to Laos voluntarily, with development assistance from UNHCR, allegations of forced repatriation surfaced. Of those Hmong who did return to Laos, some escaped back to Thailand, describing discrimination and brutal treatment at the hands of Lao authorities.

Following the Vue Mai incident, debate over the Hmong's planned repatriation to Laos intensified, especially in the U.S., where it drew opposition from American conservatives and some human rights advocates. In an October 23, 1995 National Review article, Michael Johns, the former Heritage Foundation foreign policy expert and Republican White House aide, labeled the Hmong's repatriation a Clinton administration "betrayal," describing the Hmong as a people "who have spilled their blood in defense of American geopolitical interests."

In their opposition of the repatriation plans, Republicans challenged the Clinton administration's position that the Laotian government was not systematically violating Hmong human rights. U.S. Representative Steve Gunderson (R-WI), for instance, told a Hmong gathering: "I do not enjoy standing up and saying to my government that you are not telling the truth, but if that is necessary to defend truth and justice, I will do that."

While some accusations of forced repatriation were denied, thousands of Hmong people refused to return to Laos. In 1996, as the deadline for the closure of Thai refugee camps approached, and under mounting political pressure, the U.S. agreed to resettle Hmong refugees who passed a new screening process. Around 5,000 Hmong people who were not resettled at the time of the camp closures sought asylum at Wat Tham Krabok, a Buddhist monastery in central Thailand where more than 10,000 Hmong refugees were already living. The Thai government attempted to repatriate these refugees, and the Wat Tham Krabok Hmong refused to leave and the Lao government refused to accept them, claiming they were involved in the illegal drug trade and were of non-Lao origin.

In 2003, following threats of forcible removal by the Thai government, the U.S agreed to accept 15,000 of the refugees. Some thousand Hmong people, fearing forced repatriation to Laos if they were not accepted for resettlement in the U.S., fled the camp to live elsewhere within Thailand where a Hmong population has been present since the 19th century.

In 2004 and 2005, thousands of Hmong fled from the jungles of Laos to a temporary refugee camp in the Thai province of Phetchabun.

Lending further support to earlier claims that the government of Laos was persecuting the Hmong, filmmaker Rebecca Sommer documented first-hand accounts in her documentary, Hunted Like Animals, and in a comprehensive report which includes summaries of claims made by the refugees and was submitted to the U.N. in May 2006.

The European Union, UNHCHR, and international groups have since spoken out about the forced repatriation. The Thai foreign ministry has said that it will halt deportation of Hmong refugees held in Detention Centers Nong Khai, while talks are underway to resettle them in Australia, Canada, the Netherlands and the United States.

For the time being, countries willing to resettle the refugees are hindered to proceed with immigration and settlement procedures because the Thai administration does not grant them access to the refugees. Plans to resettle additional Hmong refugees in the U.S. have been complicated by provisions of President George W. Bush's Patriot Act and Real ID Act, under which Hmong veterans of the Secret War, who fought on the side of the United States, are classified as terrorists because of their historical involvement in armed conflict.

On December 27, 2009, The New York Times reported that the Thai military was preparing to forcibly return 4,000 Hmong asylum seekers to Laos by the end of the year: the BBC later reported that repatriations had started. United States and United Nations officials have protested this action. Outside government representatives have not been allowed to interview this group over 3 years. Médecins Sans Frontières has refused to assist the Hmong refugees because of what they have called "increasingly restrictive measures" taken by the Thai military. The Thai military jammed all cellular phone reception and disallowed any foreign journalists from the Hmong camps.

== Freedom of religion ==
In 2023, the country was scored 1 out of 4 for religious freedom; it was noted that the Lao People's Revolutionary Party controls clergy training and supervision of Buddhist temples. There have been cases of Christians being detained for unauthorized religious activities. The country as a whole scored 13 out of 100 for freedom in political and civil liberties. In the same year, the country was ranked as the 31st worst place in the world to be a Christian.

== See also ==
- Laotian penal system
- LGBT rights in Laos
