= Chief of General Staff (Laos) =

The Chief of the General Staff (Lao: ຫົວໜ້າເສນາທິການໃຫຍ່) is the chief of staff of the General Staff of the Lao People's Armed Forces. The chief of the General Staff performs the task of advising the minister of defense in terms of state management and military command, by that practically being the second highest-ranking professional leader of the Lao People's Armed Forces. The chief of the General Staff also serves ex officio as standing deputy minister of defense. He is appointed by the President of Laos, who is the commander-in-chief as Chairman of the Defence and Public Security Commission. The current chief of the General Staff is Lieutenant General Saichay Kommasith.

It is externally equivalent to the Chief of the General Staff in Vietnam or Chief of the Joint Staff Departmentin China of other countries.

== List of chiefs ==
- General Sisavath Keobounphanh (1976–1980)
- Colonel General Suvon Luangbunmi (2010s–2022)
- Lieutenant General Khamlieng Outhakaysone (2022–2025)
- Senior Lieutenant General Saichay Kommasith (2025–Present)
