= LGBTQ rights in Laos =

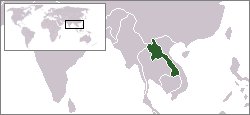
- Laos
- Legal status: Legal
- Discrimination protections: Limited protections

Family rights
- Recognition of relationships: No
- Adoption: No

Homosexuality is legal in Laos. Claims have suggested that Laos is "one of the most tolerant" communist states. A Gallup poll in June 2024 found that Laos was a gay-friendly country and 54% of Laotians thought that their country was a good place to live for gay people.

== Legality of same-sex sexual activity ==
Same-sex sexual activity is legal in Laos, and has never been criminalized. Having been a former colony of France, Laos never inherited any anti-sodomy laws since the French declared such laws as unconstitutional in 1791. The age of consent is 15, regardless of sexual orientation or gender identity.

== Discrimination protections ==
There are no laws prohibiting discrimination based on sexual orientation, and the Constitution of Laos does not expressly address sexual orientation or gender identity issues.

On 21 January 2020, at the 35th Session - Universal Periodic Review at UN Human Rights Council, there was a recommendation on The Sexual Orientation and Gender Identity Expression (SOGIE-LGBTI) from Christopher Grima, Ambassador and Permanent Representative of Malta to the United Nations Office in Geneva, to the delegation of Lao PDR to: "Continue taking steps to improve the rights of lesbian, gay, bisexual, transgender and intersex persons, particularly by identifying their needs, and consider involving lesbian, gay, bisexual, transgender and intersex representatives in decision-making processes."

There was a recommendation from Harald Aspelund, Ambassador, Permanent Mission of Iceland to the United Nations in Geneva, to the delegation of Lao PDR to: "Adopt comprehensive anti-discrimination legislation that addresses direct and indirect discrimination and encompasses all the prohibited grounds of discrimination, including sexual orientation and gender identity."

In May 12, 2017, the Law on Electronic Data Protection (No. 25/NA) lists out sexual behaviour under the Prohibited data category.

== Living conditions ==
In 2013, the United States Department of State reported that "societal discrimination based on sexual orientation and against persons with HIV/AIDS" was prevalent.

Theravada Buddhism is the most predominant religion in Laos. LGBTQ activist Anan Bouapha has stated, "Many people might think that Laos is conservative and extremely close-minded when it comes to LGBT issues. Realistically, our culture and mentality seem to be quite open-minded to people from all walks of life. I have seen many transgender people wearing traditional costumes to temples, attending traditional ceremonies and some gay students expressing [their] identity among [their] peers and teachers."

=== Groups and organisations ===
Non-governmental organizations (NGOs) are permitted to organise and campaign in Laos, and are under state supervision. Phil Robertson, deputy director for Asia at Human Rights Watch, has said, "The Laotian government has never really been very friendly towards NGOs, and has forced them as well as other development partners sent by the UN to cooperate with state-controlled organizations. The Laotian leadership does place much value on transparency or dialogue with civil society." Proud To Be Us Laos (Lao: ພູມໃຈທີ່ເປັນເຮົາ) was founded in 2012 as the country's first LGBTQ association. Founded by Anan Bouapha, then aged 25, the group organised the first LGBTQ Pride in Laos in June 2012. Officials and government members have attended their events.

=== Culture, events and media ===
Gay foreigners visiting Laos in the 1990s sometimes reported a taboo associated with foreigners that made it hard to interact with Laotians, except discreetly at night. The Government of Laos has blocked access to LGBTQ themed webpages in the past and discussions about LGBTQ issues in the media are "rare", beyond transsexuals who are visible in the culture as entertainment. It does generally tolerate, or simply ignore, LGBTQ people unless they campaign for LGBTQ rights or are judged to be too publicly "immodest or indecent". In 2014, a decree was issued prohibiting criticism of all government policies.

The first public LGBT Pride in Laos was held in June 2012 on the sports field of the U.S. embassy in Vientiane, with 100 participants; the guests of honor were U.S. Ambassador to Laos Karen Stewart and Bounpheng Philavong, director of the Center for HIV/AIDS/STI (CHAS) at the Lao Ministry of Health. The event was organized by Laotian and intergovernmental organizations, including the Purple Sky Network, Lao Positive Health Association, Population Services International, the Burnet Institute, Family Health International, the Vientiane Youth Center for Health and Development, and UNFPA.

In 2015, Proud to be Us Laos marked the first International Day Against Homophobia, Transphobia and Biphobia (IDAHOT) in Laos with support from the European Union. Lattavanh Sengdala became the first transgender advocate to appear on national television speaking of her experience as a trans woman in Laos. The IDAHOT celebration was reported on Lao National Television, a governmental TV channel. In 2016, the European Union supported the organising of the second IDAHOT celebration, where more diplomatic and civil society partners participated. Proud to be Us Laos partnered with one of the UK's leading LGBTQ rights organisations, Stonewall.

In 2017, the British, Australian, American and Canadian embassies, in partnership with Proud to be Us Laos, hosted a reception in Vientiane. Chargé d'Affairs of the Canadian Embassy Lee-Anne Hermann said, "Today, let us unite in this global celebration of diversity and community. A coming together to share experiences and stories to deepen our understanding and appreciation of LGBTI persons and their contributions to society." The event was attended by some representatives from the Lao Ministry of Foreign Affairs.

In 2018, four more embassies participated in the advocacy campaign, namely France, Germany, Switzerland and Luxembourg. The U.S. embassy organised a panel discussion with partners and a Lao audience at the American Centre.

IDAHOT 2019 was organised at the Australian embassy in Vientiane on 17 May. The event was attended by 15 embassies, staff from local Lao civil society organizations, international NGOs, and others.

In August 2019, Anan Bouapha, founder and president of Proud To Be Us Laos, was named as one of the Grand Marshals of that year's Montreal Pride. They were welcomed by Justin Trudeau, Prime Minister of Canada.

On 19 December 2019, "Being LGBT At Work (A STUDY OF LGBTI PERSONS IN THE WORKPLACE IN LAO PDR)", conducted by the Faculty of Law and Political Science at the National University of Laos, the Law and Development Partnership and Proud to Be Us Laos, was officially presented at the Annual Legal Research Forum 2019.

In March 2025, Maifong Maixai, a member of the National Assembly of Laos for Constituency 12, Khammouane Province, proposed changing Article 36 of the 2025 revised Constitution to expand room for non-discrimination protections for gender-diverse people.

On 12 June 2025, the Lao Women's Union published an article titled "The Voice of Pride", which featured the story of Thavadxai Xaiyakoumman, a Project Officer of Proud To Be Us Laos and mentioned Proud To Be Us Laos as the country’s first advocacy group for the LGBTQIA+ community.

== Summary table ==
Same-sex sexual activity legal	Yes (Always legal)
Equal age of consent (15)	Yes (Always equal)
Anti-discrimination laws in employment only	No
Anti-discrimination laws in the provision of goods and services	No
Anti-discrimination laws in all other areas (incl. indirect discrimination, hate speech)	Yes / No
Same-sex marriages	No
Recognition of same-sex couples	No
Stepchild adoption by same-sex couples	No
Joint adoption by same-sex couples	No
Adoption by single people regardless of sexual orientation	No
LGBTQ people allowed to serve openly in the military	No
Right to change legal gender	Yes
Access to IVF for lesbians	No
Commercial surrogacy for gay male couples	No
MSMs allowed to donate blood	No

== See also ==
- Human rights in Laos
