= Punishment in Laos =

This page is about the Laotian Penal System.

== Trials ==
In 2002, it was reported that the normal function of a defence lawyer in a Laotian court was to argue mitigating circumstances and the extent of the defendant's co-operation before asking for clemency.

== Types of prisoners ==
In Laos, there are four categories of persons imprisoned: 1) common criminals, 2) political deviants, 3) social deviants and 4) ideological deviants. The LPDR established four different types of detention centers: prisons, re-education centers or seminar camps, rehabilitation camps, and remolding centers. Social deviants or common criminals were considered less threatening to the regime than persons accused of political crimes, who were considered potential counter-revolutionaries. Social deviants were confined in rehabilitation camps.

According to MacAlister Brown and Joseph J. Zasloff, prisons were primarily for common criminals, but political prisoners also were held there for short periods, usually six to twelve months. Ideologically suspect persons were sent to remolding centers. Re-education centers were for those deemed politically risky, usually former RLG officials. Political prisoners usually served three- to five-year terms or longer. As at the prisons, inmates worked hard under rugged conditions and had limited supplies of food. There was little political indoctrination. Bribery in order to secure food and medicine was reported.

== Penal system history ==
In 1986, Brown and Zasloff also reported that prisoners were not tried but were incarcerated simply by administrative fiat. Former inmates said that they were arrested, informed by the security officials that they had been charged with crimes, and then sent off to camps for indeterminate periods. Typically, prisoners were told one day prior to their release to prepare for departure.

The status of the detention centers also is vague. In 1984, Vientiane declared that all reeducation centers had been closed. At that time, Amnesty International estimated 6,000 to 7,000 political prisoners held in these centers. The government acknowledged that there were some former inmates in remote areas but claimed that their confinement was voluntary. In the late 1980s, the government closed some of the reeducation centers and released most of the detainees.

In 1989, Laos took steps to reduce the number of political prisoners, many of whom had been held since 1975. Several hundred detainees, including many high-ranking officials and officers from the former United States-backed RLG and Royal Lao Army, were released from reeducation centers in the northeastern province of Houaphan. Released prisoners reported that hundreds of individuals remained in custody in as many as eight camps, including at least six generals and former high-ranking members of the RLG.

These individuals reportedly performed manual labor such as log cutting, repairing roads, and building irrigation systems. In 1993 Amnesty International reported human rights violations in the continued detention of three "prisoners of conscience" detained since 1975—but not sentenced until 1992—as well as those held under restrictions or, according to international standards, the subjects of unfair trials.

In 1993, reports indicated that some high-ranking officials of the RLG and military remained in state custody. Those accused of hostility to the regime were subject to arrest and confinement for long periods of time. Prison conditions were harsh, and prisoners were routinely denied family visitation and proper medical care.

== Prisons ==
- Phonthong Prison, known as the 'Foreigners Prison', is a mixed sex prison near Vientiane. The prison is used to hold non-Laotian prisoners.

== See also ==
- Human rights in Laos
