= Sex trafficking in Laos =

Human trafficking for sexual exploitation

Sex trafficking in Laos is human trafficking for sexual exploitation and slavery that occurs in the Lao People's Democratic Republic. Laos is primarily an origin country for sexually trafficked persons.

Sex trafficking victims in the country are from all ethnic groups in Laos and foreigners. Laos citizens, primarily women and girls, have been sex trafficked into other countries in Asia and different continents. They are threatened and forced into prostitution, marriages, and or pregnancies. Sex trafficked victims experience physical and psychological trauma. They contract sexually transmitted diseases from rapes, and abuse and malnutrition are prevalent. Some women and girls are tortured and or murdered.

Sex trafficking and exploitation is pervasive throughout all levels of Laos society. Male and female perpetrators in Laos come from diverse backgrounds. A number of traffickers are members of or facilitated by gangs.

The extent of sex trafficking in Laos is unknown because of the lack of data, the concealed nature of sex trafficking crimes, and other factors. Anti-sex trafficking efforts have been hindered by corruption, indifference, border management problems, and more.

== Victims ==
Women and girls are sex trafficked in and out of all the administrative divisions of Laos.

Laos women and girls are sex trafficked into Thailand, Vietnam, China, Taiwan, Japan, and other countries throughout the world. They are forced into marriages or brothels and karaoke bars, and unfree labour in homes or on farms. Many are tied or locked up and harmed. A number of traumatized victims have nightmares. Rescued victims do not receive adequate rehabilitation services. They experience stigma. Some have been re-trafficked because of the lack of protection.

Women and girls from families in poverty and lack education, as well as children, are vulnerable to sex trafficking. People from minority groups are also susceptible.

== Perpetrators ==
The traffickers are often part of gangs. The perpetrators are sometimes the victims' family members or acquaintances.

== Anti-sex trafficking efforts ==
The Government of Laos does not fully meet the minimum standards for the elimination of trafficking but is making significant efforts to do so. Resources are scarce.

== Corruption ==
Corruption and impunity have hampered Laos's response in reducing sex trafficking. Some officials and police have facilitated the trafficking of women and girls and or are on the perpetrators' payroll. Authorities accept bribes and commit document forgery and fraud.

== Government response problems ==
The Laos government has been criticized for its anti-sex trafficking efforts. Some police have been negligent. Long-term support for victims is inadequate.

== Non-governmental organizations ==
Village Focus International (VFI) carries out anti-sex trafficking initiatives in Laos.
