= Phonthong Prison =

Mixed-gender prison in Laos

Ponthong Prison
- Location: Near Vientiane, Laos

Notable prisoners
- Kerry and Kay Danes; Samantha Orobator

Phonthong Prison (Lao: ຄຸກໂພນຕ້ອງ), known as the "Foreigners Prison", is a mixed gender prison near Vientiane, Laos. The prison is used to hold non-Laotian prisoners.

== History ==
In Laos, there are four categories of prisoners:

- 1) common criminals,
- 2) political deviants
- 3) social deviants
- 4) ideological deviants

From 2000 to 2001, Phonthong Prison received media attention when Australians Kerry and Kay Danes were incarcerated and sentenced to seven years for embezzlement, tax evasion, and destruction of evidence. The Australian government intervened, and a pardon was granted.

In August 2008, Briton Samantha Orobator was arrested with 680 grams of heroin and became pregnant while in Phonthong. In June 2009, she was sentenced to life imprisonment. Lao law prescribed the death penalty for drug smuggling, but Orobator avoided this sentence due to her pregnancy. In August 2009, she was repatriated to the UK to serve the balance of her sentence. In due course, Orobator was released subject to a life licence. The England and Wales High Court ruled that she had not suffered a "flagrant denial of justice".

== See also ==
- Punishment in Laos
