= Max Green (lawyer) =

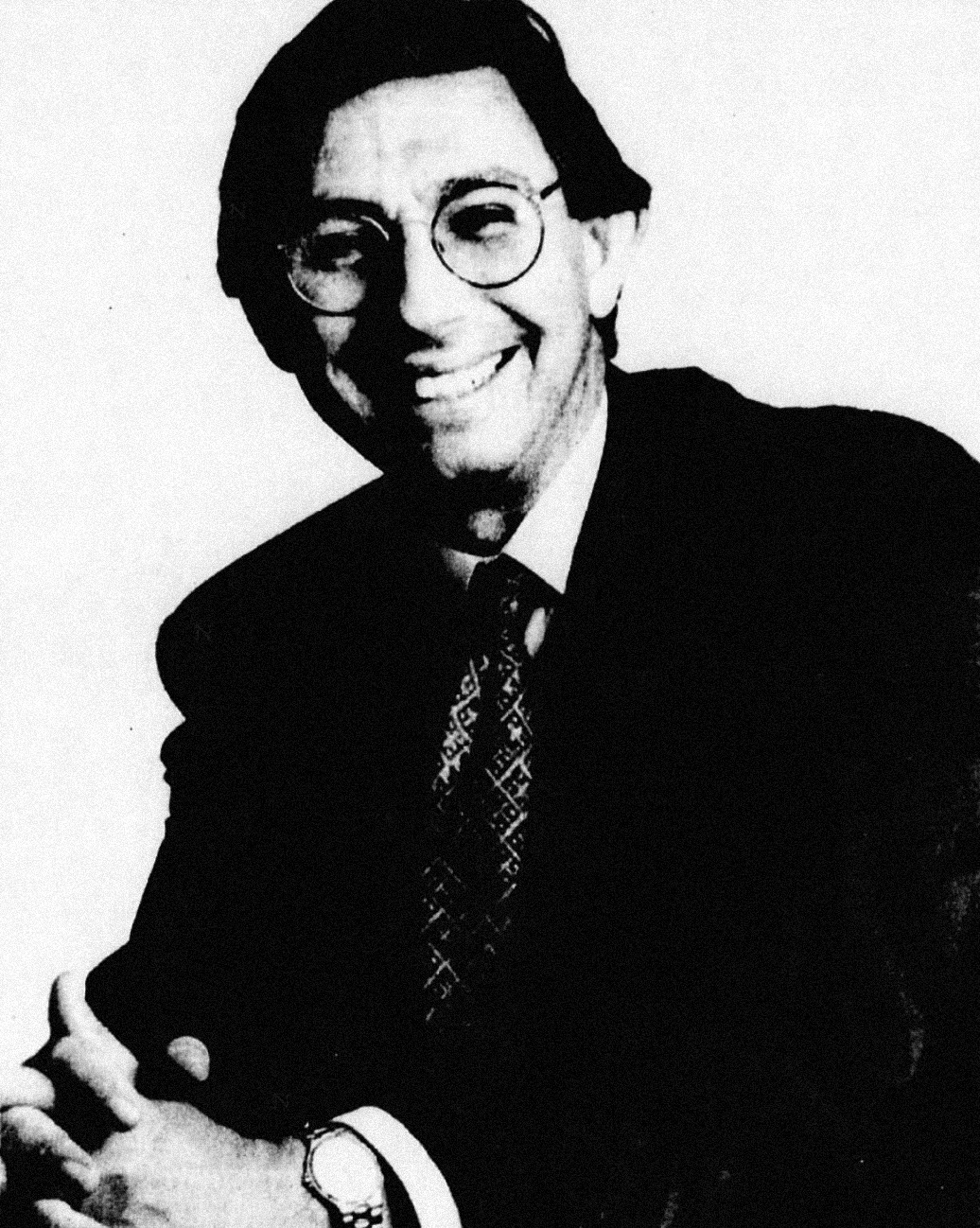
- Born: 1952; London, England
- Died: 25 March 1998 (aged 45–46); Phnom Penh, Cambodia
- Cause of death: Murder
- Occupations: Company director, lawyer
- Known for: Tax avoidance scam
- Spouse(s): Louise Giselle Baron (m. 1976)
- Children: 1
- Parent(s): Millie and David Green
- Relatives: Phil Green (brother); Stuart Baron (brother-in-law)

Max Paul Green (1952 – 25 March 1998) was an English-born lawyer and alleged conman who practised in Australia. During the 1990s, he became the central figure in a major tax-minimisation scheme that was later found to involve large-scale fraud. In 1998, Green was murdered in Cambodia under circumstances that remain unresolved.

== Life and career ==
Max Green was born in London, England, to parents Millie and David Green. The family observed Jewish customs. They emigrated to Australia around 1957 and settled in Sydney, where Green received his legal education. After graduating, he moved to Melbourne and married Louise Giselle Baron. He joined the board of her uncle Raymond Vidor's costume jewellery company, Emma Page, in 1981. Vidor supposedly approached Green to re-establish Emma Page in the United States, and from 1985 to 1989, the family lived in Texas and New Jersey. But green was supposedly unable to sufficiently motivate a sales force and was therefore unable to meet Vidor's expectations.

So the family returned to Melbourne, and Green was employed in production planning and credit control on the factory floor of his brother-in-law's company. But seeing no future there, he left. In 1991, Green became a partner at the Melbourne law firm Shugg & Green, alongside Gary Vernon Shugg. This was against the advice of his wife, who discouraged him from entering the partnership.

Green departed the firm in late 1993. His family later told a coroner that Green faced constant challenges both personally and professionally, and that they found him jobs and helped him financially during this period. In 1995, Shugg was suspended from legal practice for three years, and the firm was placed into receivership in June 1994 amid financial and regulatory difficulties. Allegations were later made, though never proven, that the firm had been involved in illegal arms trading.

== Tax minimisation scam ==
During the early 1990s, Green established an investment structure promoted as a lawful tax-minimisation scheme. Under Australian tax law, certain low-value equipment purchases could be fully depreciated in the year of acquisition. Green’s scheme claimed to exploit this provision by purchasing equipment and leasing it to CityLink, which was then constructing toll roads in Melbourne. The structure involved borrowing up to four times the initial capital from a Hong Kong bank. Approximately A$42 million was invested, largely by private individuals. Several prominent Melbourne businessmen participated including lawyers, retail chain proprietors, and property developers. Investors were promised annual returns of around 15 per cent, together with tax deductions arising from depreciation claims.

Investigators later determined that the scheme was fraudulent. Although documentation suggested substantial equipment purchases, no equipment was ever acquired, and CityLink had no leasing arrangement with the fund. Significant sums were siphoned from trust accounts and transferred through a complex network of domestic and offshore bank accounts. Authorities were unable to recover the misappropriated funds. Police and regulators later alleged that Green laundered much of the money through the international gemstone trade, including the purchase of high-value gems in Cambodia and their subsequent resale in Israel. The Victorian Lawyers RPA Ltd, the regulatory body associated with the Victorian Law Institute, commenced an investigation into trust-account irregularities linked to Green and Aroni Colman.

== Murder ==
On 24 March 1998, Green stayed overnight at the Sofitel Cambodiana hotel in Phnom Penh, Cambodia. He was scheduled to fly to Hong Kong the following morning. On 25 March, he was found dead in his hotel room. He had sustained severe head and facial injuries and was strangled with a necktie. His laptop computer was missing, though cash and credit cards were untouched. Due to the extent of facial injuries, Green’s body was later exhumed in Melbourne to confirm identification.

No arrests were made, and the murder remains unsolved. Police have publicly stated that they believed the killing may have been professionally organised and potentially motivated by revenge related to Green’s financial activities, though no definitive conclusions were reached. Green’s associate and gem trader Ted Doyle later commented on the circumstances surrounding his death, describing Green as having become entangled with dangerous individuals in the course of his business dealings.

== The Bodhi Tree ==
The Bodhi Tree was a proposed film centred on the life and death of Max Green. The screenplay was written by Robert Lewis Galinsky, who was also attached as executive producer, in collaboration with actors-turned-producers Mirko Grillini and Amanda Grillini.

In discussing the project’s development, Galinsky stated that reactions among individuals who had been scammed by Green were mixed: some agreed to participate as investors, while others opposed the film’s production. Referring to the controversy, Galinsky remarked, “So, if I get unexpectedly killed in the next few weeks … find out who did it!”

The film was ultimately not released.
