= Souvannarath =

Prince Souvannarath (Lao: ເຈົ້າສຸວັນນະລາດ, 8 July 1893 – 23 June 1960) was the 3rd prime minister of the Kingdom of Laos from 1947 – 1948. He was a son of Prince Bounkhong and half-brother to Princes Phetsarath, Souvanna Phouma and Souphanouvong.

Political offices
Preceded by Kindavong	Prime Minister of Laos; 1947–1948	Succeeded by Boun Oum
