= Sounthone Pathammavong =

Laotian officer and politician

- Born: 1911
- Died: 1985 (aged 73–74)
- Military career
- Allegiance: Kingdom of Laos
- Branch: Royal Lao Army
- Service years: 1950–1972
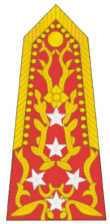
- Rank: General
- Known for: Prime Minister of Laos
- Conflicts: First Indochina War; Laotian Civil War
- Other work: Member of the Committee for the Defence of National Interests

General Sounthone Pathammavong (Lao: ສຸນທອນ ປະຖຳມະວົງ, 1911–1985) was the Prime Minister of the Kingdom of Laos from 31 December 1959 to 7 January 1960 and Army Chief of Staff of the Royal Lao Armed Forces.

== See also ==
- Laotian Civil War
- Royal Lao Army Airborne
- Royal Lao Armed Forces

Political offices
Preceded by Phoui Sananikone	Prime Minister of Laos; 1959–1960	Succeeded by Kou Abhay
