= 1972 Laotian parliamentary election =

- 2 January 1972
- All 60 seats in National Assembly; 31 seats needed for a majority
- Turnout: 67.76%
Prime Minister before	Prime Minister after
Souvanna Phouma; Lao Neutralist Party	Souvanna Phouma; Lao Neutralist Party

Parliamentary elections were held in Laos on 2 January 1972 to elect members of the National Assembly, the lower chamber of Parliament. The elections were contested by around 200 candidates, and more than two-thirds of incumbent MPs lost their seats. Voter turnout was 67.8%.

The election was contested by around 200 candidates, who generally ran as individuals rather than on formal party platforms; the Neo Lao Hak Xat and its military arm, the Pathet Lao, boycotted the election and declared it illegal. More than two-thirds of the members of the previous National Assembly failed to retain their seats, while 58 men and two women were elected.

The election was the last parliamentary election held under the Kingdom of Laos, which was abolished following the Pathet Lao's seizure of power in December 1975. It was also the last competitive multiparty parliamentary election held in Laos before the establishment of the Lao People's Democratic Republic and the subsequent introduction of a one-party political system.

== Results ==
Party	Votes	%	Seats
National Progressive Party			3
Other parties			57
Total			60
Total votes	619,271	–	
Registered voters/turnout	913,862	67.76	
Source: Nohlen et al.
