= Somsanith Vongkotrattana =

Prime Minister of Laos (1913–1975)

Prince Somsanith Vongkotrattana
- ເຈົ້າສົມສະນິດ ວົງກົຕຣັຕນະ

10th Prime Minister of Laos
- In office 3 June 1960 – 15 August 1960
- Monarch: Sisavang Vatthana
- Deputy: Phoumi Nosavan; Unknown
- Leader: Phoumi Nosavan; Kong Le
- Preceded by: Kou Abhay
- Succeeded by: Prince Souvanna Phouma

Personal details
- Born: 19 April 1913 Luang Phrabang, Laos
- Died: 1975 (aged 61–62) Luang Phrabang, Laos
- Party: Committee for the Defence of the National Interests
- Profession: Prime Minister

Military service
- Branch/service: Royal Lao Police
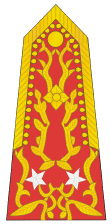
- Rank: Brigadier general
- Commands: Royal Lao Police (1954–1958)
- Battles/wars: First Indochina War, Laotian Civil War

Prince Somsanith Vongkotrattana (Lao: ເຈົ້າສົມສນິດ ວົງກົຕຣັຕນະ; 19 April 1913 – 1975) also known as Tiao Somsanith was the Prime Minister of Laos in 1960.

He was born in Luang Prabang, Laos. His mother, Princess Sanghiemkham, was one of Prince Bounkhong's daughters making Prince Souvanna Phouma, Prince Souphanouvong, Prince Phetsarath and Prince Kindavong his step uncles. His father was Prince Khamman Vongkotrattana who after a career in government service became a historian.

Somsanith was the minister of interior and justice in the Lao Issara government from 1945 to 1946, and followed the cabinet into exile in Thailand 1946-1949. Following his return to Laos, he was first appointed Director General of the Laotian National Police, with the rank of Brigadier general (1954–1958), being afterwards minister of finance (1959-1960) and minister of justice. He was appointed Prime Minister of Laos by the king in June 1960, and his government was overthrown later in 1960.

He was elected President of National Assembly from 1961 to 1963.

== Bibliography ==
- Frank E. Walton, A Survey of the Laos National Police, Office of Public Safety, Agency for International Development, Department of State, Washington, D.C., 1965. –
- Joel Halpern, Laos Profiles, Laos project, Paper No. 19, University of Massachusetts – Amherst, 1 June 1961. –
- Martin Stuart-Fox, Historical Dictionary of Laos, Third Edition, Historical Dictionaries of Asia, Oceania, and the Middle East, No. 67, Scarecrow Press, Inc., Lanham, Maryland, Toronto, Plymouth, UK 2008. ISBN 978-0-8108-5624-0, 0-8108-5624-7 – Martin Stuart-Fox: Third Edition | PDF | Laos

Political offices
Preceded by Kou Abhay	Prime Minister of Laos; 3 June 1960 – 15 August 1960	Succeeded by Souvanna Phouma
