= Souvanna Phomma =

Souvanna Phomma was the son of Oupahat Oun Keo and was the grandson of King Anurutha. He was a Laotian politician who was installed as oupahat, a royal title for the viceroy of a Buddhist dynasty, of Luang Phrabang in 1878. He authored a History of Louang Phrabang.

== Family ==
He had nineteen sons, including Bounkhong, and thirty-one daughters. Souvanna Phomma had at least thirteen wives: the first was a commoner, the second was the daughter of King Sukaseum, the third was a daughter of King Chantharat, the fourth was from an unknown royal lineage, and both the fifth and sixths were his half-sisters; the next seven wives were all commoners.

His grandchildren include:

- Souphanouvong – the first president of Laos
- Souvanna Phouma – prime minister of the Kingdom of Laos
- Phetsarath Ratanavongsa – the first prime minister of Luang Phrabang in French Laos from 21 August 1941 to 10 October 1945, and head of state of Laos between 12 October 1945 and 24 April 1946
- Kindavong - The second Prime minister of Laos from April 23, 1946 to March 15, 1947.

== Death ==
He was beheaded during the sacking of Luang Prabang, by Đèo Văn Trị, a Tai Dam (Black Tai) chieftain at Lai Chau, on 8 June 1887.

== See also ==
- List of Lao people
- List of people who were beheaded
