= Mangkra Souvanna Phouma =

Laotian royal (1938–2025)

- Born: 24 February 1938; Luang Phrabang, Laos, French Indochina
- Died: 8 January 2025 (aged 86)
- Spouse: Princess Tiao Oanna Rangsi
- Issue: 4 sons and daughters
- Father: Souvanna Phouma
- Mother: Aline Claire Allard

Prince Mangkra Souvanna Phouma (24 February 1938 – 8 January 2025) was a royal in the Kingdom of Laos and the son of Prince Souvanna Phouma.

== Biography ==
From 1975, Souvanna Phouma lived in exile in Paris, France. He was married to Tiao Oanna Rangsi and they had four children.

Prince Mangkra was the founder and president of the Laos Committee for the Defense of Laws and People, which aims to remove the current government of Laos and establish a constitutional monarchy. He worked along with other members of the Laos royal family, such as Prince Sauryavong Savang, Crown Prince Soulivong Savang and Prince Thayavong Savang to establish a constitutional monarchy in Laos. Prince Mangkra Souvanna Phouma also served as a member of the Council of Regency of Laos. He believed that the Laotian royal family can provide social and economic change for the Lao people to bring unity and bring a peaceful solution to problems faced by the country.

Prince Mangkra died on 8 January 2025, at the age of 86.

== Awards ==
Mangkra Souvanna Phouma received the Commander of the Order of Social Merit and the Knight of the Grand Order of the Legion of Honour, both from France.
