= Aline Claire Allard =

Wife of Prime Minister Souvanna Phouma (1912–1977)

- Born: December 25, 1912; Xiangkhouang, Laos, French Indochina
- Died: September 7, 1977 (aged 64); Île de Ré, Charente-Maritime, France
- Other names: Aline Claire Souvanna Phouma; Mrs. Souvanna Phouma
- Occupation: Diplomat
- Spouse: Souvanna Phouma (m. 1933; div. 1969)
- Children: 4

Aline Claire Allard (December 25, 1912 – September 7, 1977) was a French Laotian diplomat and public figure. She was married to the prominent Laotian politician Souvanna Phouma from 1933 until their divorce in 1969, and she is thought to have been a major influence during his years as prime minister.

== Early life, education, and career ==
Aline Claire Allard was born in Xiangkhouang, Laos, in 1912. The country was then a French protectorate. Her father was Numa Prosper Allard, a French civil servant who served as the president of Laos' chamber of commerce and agriculture. Her mother was Laotian.

She traveled to study in Hanoi and subsequently in Paris. There, she attended the École normale supérieure de Fontenay-aux-Roses. After graduating, she began working in diplomacy, starting in Geneva at the Palace of Nations. From 1957 to 1959, she worked as an advisor to the Assembly of the French Union, and she also led Laotian delegations to various United Nations bodies throughout her career. In these fora, she was particularly involved in issues of hunger and of women's roles in the Third World. She also spent a period as Laos' director of international cultural relations.

== Personal life ==
In 1933, Allard married Souvanna Phouma, a powerful Laotian politician who served several stints as prime minister between 1951 and 1975. The couple had four children, including the political activist Mangkra Souvanna Phouma. Allard was Roman Catholic, and she raised her children Catholic as well.

After her marriage, Allard became known as Princess Souvanna Phouma. She gained a reputation for her "lively intelligence" and "flair for politics," and she was considered a major influence on her husband's political decision-making. Some commentators at the time considered her to be the source of Phouma's somewhat pro-Western attitudes.

Allard and Phouma divorced in 1969. She died of a heart attack in 1977 on the Île de Ré, off France's Atlantic coast, where she had a summer home.

== Honors ==
From 1958 until her death, she was a member of the Overseas Academy of Sciences. Her other honors include:

- Commander of the Order of the Million Elephants and the White Parasol (Kingdom of Laos)
- Knight of the Order of Academic Palms (France)
- Knight of the Legion of Honour (France)
