= Parliament of the Kingdom of Laos =

Bicameral legislature of the Kingdom of Laos

Type
- Type: Bicameral
- Houses: Royal Council and National Assembly

History
- Founded: November 1947
- Disbanded: 2 December 1975
- Succeeded by: National Assembly

Elections
- Last National Assembly election: 1972

Meeting place
- Vientiane

The Parliament of the Kingdom of Laos was the bicameral legislature of the Kingdom of Laos from 1947 to 1975. It consisted of the National Assembly, whose members were popularly elected, and the Royal Council, whose members were appointed by the King or elected by the National Assembly. The last elections to the National Assembly took place in 1972.

== Royal Council ==
The Royal Council or King's Council, Thipuksa Phramahakaxat, reviewed the legislations approved by the National Assembly. It had 12 appointed members. Six members were appointed by the King of Laos and six were nominated by the National Assembly. The President of the council was the presiding officer. The chamber was responsible for scrutinizing bills approved by the National Assembly, and advising the King on the approval of the bills.

President	Took office	Left office	Notes
Prince Boun Oum	1947	1949	
Kou Abhay	1949	1953 or later	
Phaya Khammao Vilay	1955		
Kou Abhay	1956 or earlier	1960	
Phaya Muong Sen	1961 or earlier	1961 or later	
Outhong Souvannavong	1965	1975	
Prince Khammao	1975	1975	

== National Assembly ==
The National Assembly (Lao: ສພາແຫ່ງຊາຕ, romanized: Spha Aehngsad) had 60 members elected in popular elections. The legislative term was five years. The President of the National Assembly was the presiding officer. According to the Constitution of the Kingdom of Laos, National Assembly was the supreme legislative body.

President	Took office	Left office	Notes
Phoui Sananikone	1947	1950	
Phao Panya	1950	1951	
Kou Voravong	1951	1954	
Pheng Phongsavan	1955	1956	
Souphanouvong	1958	1959	
Pheng Phongsavan	1959	1959	
Souvanna Phouma	May 1960	August 1960	
Somsanith Vongkotrattana	1961	1963	
Phoui Sananikone	1963	1965	
Oudom Souvannavong	1966	1967	
Phoui Sananikone	1968	1974	

== See also ==
- Kingdom of Laos
- List of legislatures by country
