= Sananikone family =

Laotian aristocratic family

The Sananikone family were a powerful conservative aristocratic family in Laos, with notable members including Prime Minister Phoui Sananikone, General Oudone Sananikone and his brother Oudong Sananikone.

== History ==
Based in Central Laos, particularly at Vientiane, the Sananikone family were often referred as the "Rockefellers" or the Kennedys of Laos. The Sananikones' owned an airline, Veha Akhat, which leased planes and pilots from Taiwan for paramilitary operations, which lend themselves easily to commerce with opium-growing tribal peoples, from which came some of their wealth. They are very private people and very little is known about them. Many members of the Sananikone clan have changed their last name to avoid being executed during the Laotian Civil War.

== See also ==
- Na Champassak Family
