= Boun Oum =

Laotian politician (1911–1980)

Prince Boun Oum
- ບຸນອຸ້ມ ນະ ຈຳປາສັກ
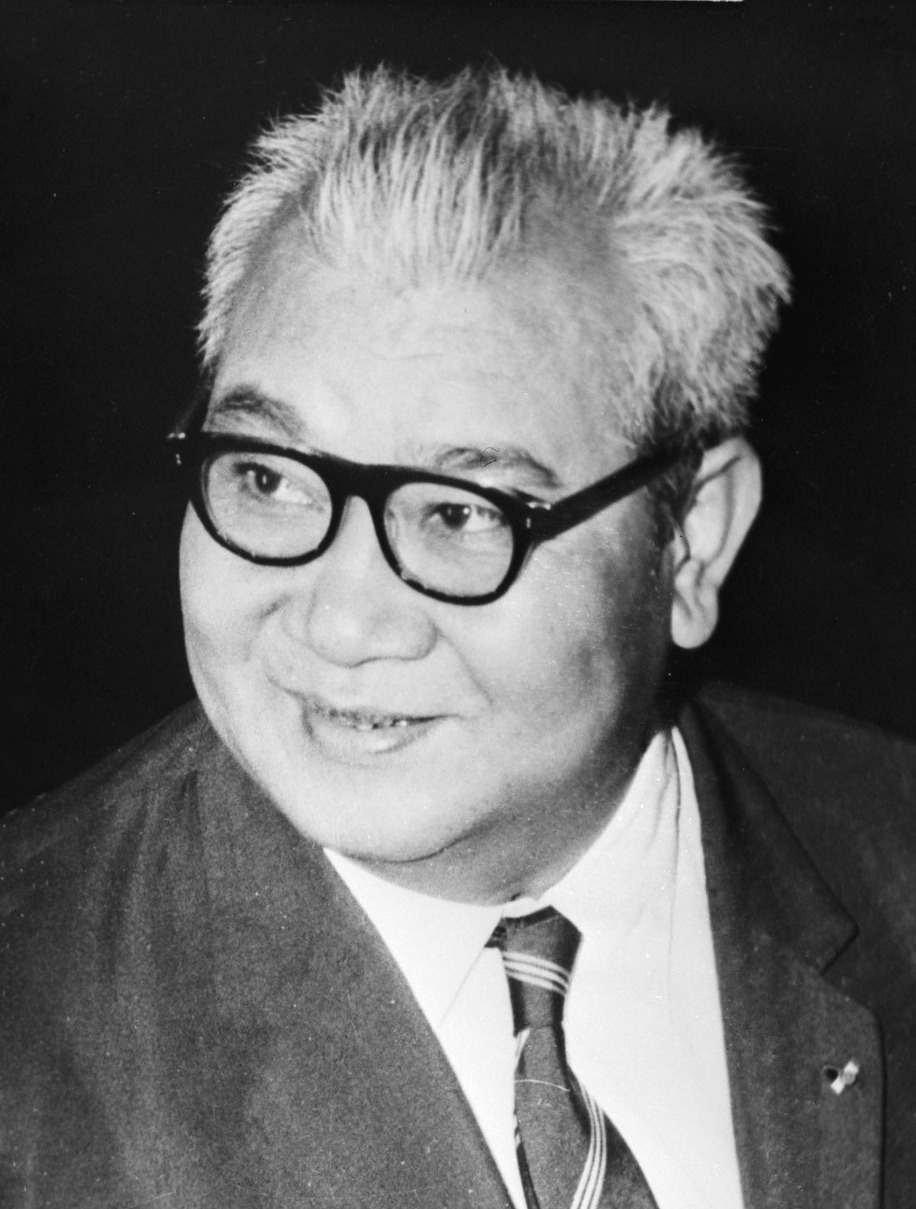
- Oum in 1971

President of the Royal Council (or also called President of the Kings Council)
- In office November 1947 – 1949
- Monarch: Sisavang Vong
- Prime Minister: Souvannarath; Himself
- Preceded by: Office established
- Succeeded by: Kou Abhay

4th Prime Minister of Laos
- In office 13 December 1960 – 23 June 1962
- Monarch: Sisavang Vatthana
- Preceded by: Souvanna Phouma
- Succeeded by: Souvanna Phouma
- In office 25 March 1948 – 24 February 1950
- Monarch: Sisavang Vong
- Preceded by: Souvannarath
- Succeeded by: Phoui Sananikone

Personal details
- Born: 2 December 1911 Champasak, Laos, French Indochina
- Died: 17 March 1980 (aged 68) Boulogne-Billancourt, France
- Party: Independent
- Spouse: Mom Nang Buvanabarni Bouaphanh
- Children: 9
- Parent: Ratsadanay (father)

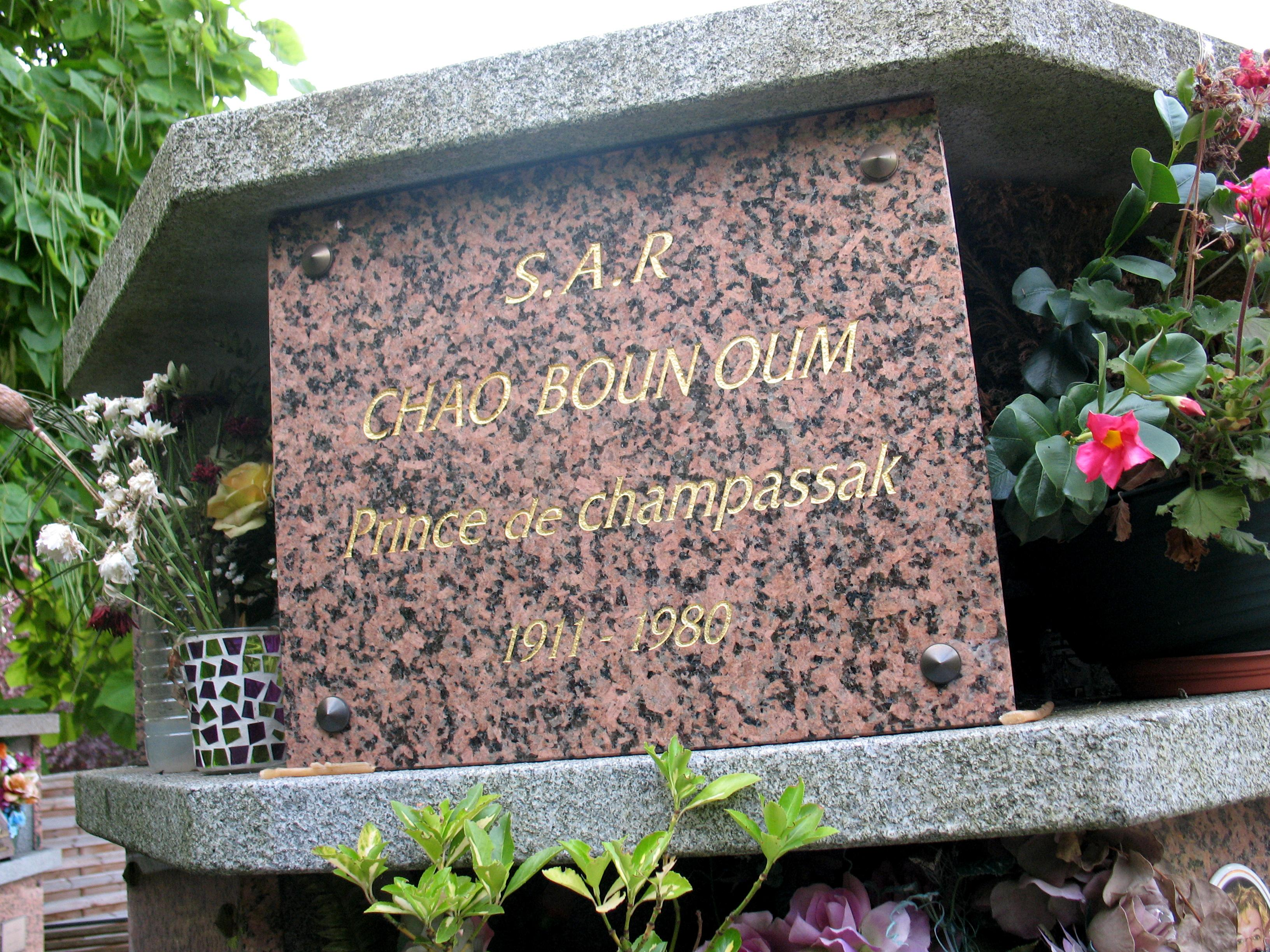
Funeral plate at Trivaux Cemetery in Meudon, France

Prince Boun Oum (also Prince Boun Oum Na Champassak; Lao: ບຸນອຸ້ມ ນະ ຈຳປາສັກ; Thai: บุญอุ้ม ณ จัมปาศักดิ์; RTGS: Bun-um Na Champasak; 2 December 1911 – 17 March 1980) was the son of King Ratsadanay, and was the hereditary prince of Champassak and also Prime Minister of the Kingdom of Laos from March 1948 to February 1950 and again from December 1960 to June 1962.

== Early life ==
He was born in Don Talad in 1911, the eldest son of Prince Ratsadanay, Prince of Champassak by his fourth wife, Princess Sudhi Saramuni. He was educated at Wat Liep Monastery Sch. and l'École de Droit, Vientiane. He met Mom Bouaphanh Soumpholphakdy of Kengkok and married in 1943. The couple had six sons and three daughters. He had 11 grandchildren. He succeeded on the death of his father as Head of the Princely House of Champassak, June 1946. At the same time, he renounced his rights in order to establish a unified kingdom, the Kingdom of Laos, on 27 August 1946. He was appointed the President of the Royal Council in 1947. In 1949, he was appointed Inspector-General of the Kingdom.

== Prime Minister of Laos ==
Sympathetic to the French in Laos, he commanded a force of 15,000 that fought Japanese troops and the Lao Issara in the south of Laos. Titular leader of the royalist faction (and one of the Three Princes of the Kingdom of Laos), he served as Prime Minister of the Kingdom of Laos from March 1949 to February 1950 and again from December 1960 to June 1962 when The National Assembly installed him by unanimous vote. His second government was described as right-wing.

He retired from politics to pursue business interests from his base in Pakse and Champassak but continued to be a major power broker until his exile in 1975, the year the communist Pathet Lao came to power. In 1975 he went to France for medical treatment and never returned to Laos. He died in Boulogne-Billancourt, France in 1980 and his ashes are buried at the Cimetiere de Trivaux in Meudon France, next to his wife Princess Bouaphanh na Champassak (1920–2013).

== Honours ==
=== National honours ===
- Knight Grand Cross of the Order of the Million Elephants and the White Parasol
- Knight Grand Cross of the Order of the Crown of Laos
- Commander of the Order of Civic Merit of Laos

=== Foreign honours ===
- Knight Grand Cordon of the Most Exalted Order of the White Elephant, Thailand
- Grand Officer of the Royal Order of Cambodia.
- Commander of the Legion of Honour.
- Croix de Guerre, with palm and star (1941).
- Croix de Guerre 1939–1945 (1946).
- Resistance Medal, 2nd class (1945).
- Combatant's Cross (1940).
- Medal of French Gratitude, 1st class (1946).
- Indochina Campaign Commemorative Medal (1954).

== Ancestry ==
Ancestors of Boun Oum

8. Houy, Prince of Champasakti
4. Nyoutithammathone, Prince of Champasakti
2. Bua Laphan Ratsadany, Prince of Champasakti
5. Princess Kheuakham
1. Boun Oum, Prince of Champasakti
6. Chao Raja Bakinaya
3. Princess Sudhi Saramuni

Political offices
Preceded by Souvannarath	Prime Minister of Laos; 1949–1950	Succeeded by Phoui Sananikone
Preceded by Souvanna Phouma	Prime Minister of Laos; 1960–1962	Succeeded by Souvanna Phouma
