= Phoui Sananikone =

Laotian politician (1903–1983)

His Excellency Phoui Sananikone (Phagna Houakhong)
- ຜຸຍ ຊະນະນິກອນ (ພຍາຫົວຂອງ)
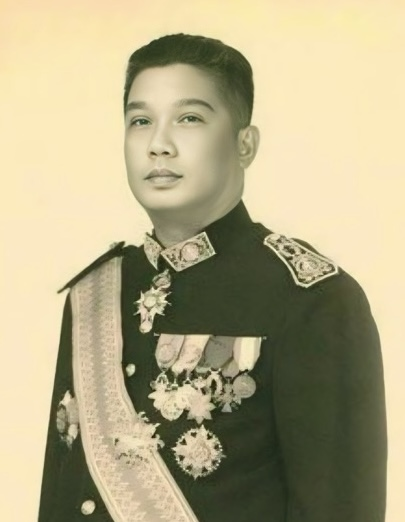
- Sananikone c.1950s

Prime Minister of Laos
- In office 24 February 1950 – 15 October 1951
- Monarch: Sisavang Vong
- Preceded by: Boun Oum
- Succeeded by: Sisavang Vatthana
- In office 18 August 1958 – 31 December 1959
- Monarchs: Sisavang Vong; Sisavang Vatthana
- Preceded by: Souvanna Phouma
- Succeeded by: Sounthone Pathammavong (Acting)

President of the Lao National Assembly
- In office 1947–1950
- Preceded by: Office established
- Succeeded by: Pao Panya
- In office 1963–1965
- Preceded by: Somsanith Vongkotrattana
- Succeeded by: Oudom Sovanvong
- In office 1968–1974
- Preceded by: Oudom Sovanvong
- Succeeded by: Souphanouvong (as President of the Standing Committee of the Supreme People's Assembly)

Personal details
- Born: 6 September 1903 Vientiane, Kingdom of Luang Prabang, French Indochina
- Died: 4 December 1983 (aged 80) Paris, France
- Party: Independent Party; Lao People's Rally
- Spouse: Sida Sananikone

Phoui Sananikone (Lao: ຜຸຍ ຊະນະນິກອນ, pronounced [pʰǔj sa.na.ni.kɔːn]; 6 September 1903 – 4 December 1983) locally known as Phagna Houakhong (Lao: ພຍາຫົວຂອງ) was a Laotian right-wing politician and statesman who served as Prime Minister (1950–1951 and 1958–1959) and first President of the Lao National Assembly. Since entering government service he had held virtually every top position in the Lao cabinet. The majority of his work as politician concerned the independence and sovereignty of Laos in Southeast Asia, especially in regards of the western-oriented neutrality policy during the height of the Indochina Wars.

Phoui Sananikone was born in Vientiane into one of the most prominent families in Laos, in a political, economic and social sense. He graduated from Pavie College in 1923 before entered the colonial civil service as secretary in the Résidence supérieure in Laos. A remarkable career followed. After his outstanding performance, where he scored the highest mark in competitive tests similar to American civil service examinations, he was appointed a district administrator. Then in 1941 he was appointed Governor (Chao Khoueng) of the Province Houakhong (known as Haut Mékong or Luang Namtha province) and later reached the highest administrative hierarchy with the rank of Chao Khoueng Special Class.

His political career began during the troubled post-war years in January 1947 as Minister of Education, Health and Social Welfare in the Royal Lao Government, where he was elected representative of Pakse and became the first president of the Lao National Assembly the same year. He took part in negotiating preceding the signature of the Franco-Lao General Convention of 1949 by which Laos became an Associated State of Indochina within the French Union. He was re-elected as president until 1950, where he resigned from his post after the Lao King Sisavang Vong commissioned him to form a cabinet. In this capacity, as Prime Minister and Defense Minister, he headed the Lao Delegation to the Pau Conference in June 1950. It was during that Year, where he and other former Lao Issara members founded the Independent Party, who later merged with the Nationalist party to win the election, where he became elected Prime Minister in his second term in August 1958.

== Early life ==
Born in 1903, he was part of the Sananikones, a powerful Laotian aristocratic family. He was elected President of National Assembly from 1947 to 1950.

== Premiership ==
Souvanna Phouma lost a vote of confidence in the National Assembly and was forced to resign. Phoui succeeded Souvanna Phouma, and formed a new cabinet with the support of Committee for the Defence of the National Interests (CDNI) members. The Pathet Lao were no longer represented in the new pro-American government. After taking up office, Sananikone and his ministers shifted Lao policy to the right, dissolved the National Assembly, and denounced the 1954 Geneva truce. Attempts were also made to disperse and neutralize Pathet Lao soldiers who had been integrated into the Royal Lao Army (RLA) a few months earlier. He resigned under right-wing military pressure and handed all power to General Phoumi Nosavan, the head of the RLA.

== Post-premiership ==
He was re-elected President of National Assembly from 1963 to 1965, and from 1968 to 1974. In May 1975 he left for France after the communist takeover. In September that year he was sentenced to death in his absence. He died in Paris, aged 80.

== Awards and decorations ==
- Grand Cross with Sash of the Order of the Million Elephants and the White Parasol (Laos)
- Grand Officer of the Order of the Million Elephants and the White Parasol
- Order of Civic Merit of Laos
- Order of the Reign (Laos)
- Order of the Crown of Thailand with Star
- Commander of the Legion of Honour (France)
- Order of Academic Palms (France)

Political offices
Preceded by Boun Oum	Prime Minister of Laos; 1950–1951	Succeeded by Sisavang Vatthana
Preceded by Souvanna Phouma	Prime Minister of Laos; 1958–1959	Succeeded by Sounthone Pathammavong
