= Kou Abhay =

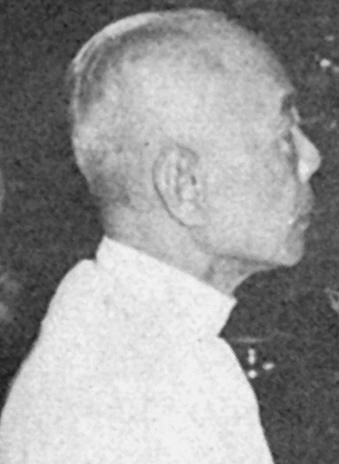
Kou Abhay in 1955

Kou Abhay (Lao: ກຸ ອະໄພ; 7 December 1892 – 1 April 1964) was a Lao politician.

He was governor of Champasak Province from 1941 to 1947, when he was appointed as the minister for education and health. In 1949, he was appointed the President of the Royal Council.

He was appointed by the King of Laos as the Prime Minister of the Kingdom of Laos from 7 January 1960 to 3 June 1960.

He was the older brother of Nhouy Abhay, who served as the National Education and Fine Arts Minister and was also the father of General Kouprasith Abhay (1932–2011) who launched a right-wing coup d'état on 19 April 1964.

Political offices
| Preceded by Phoui Sananikone | Prime Minister of Laos; 1960 | Succeeded by Somsanith Vongkotrattana |
