= Souphanouvong =

Laotian politician (1909–1995)

His Excellency Prince Souphanouvong
- ສຸພານຸວົງ
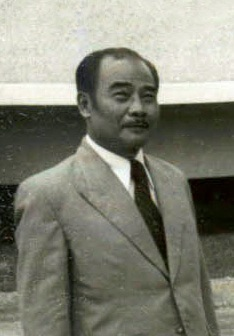
- Souphanouvong c. 1978

1st President of Laos
- In office 2 December 1975 – 29 October 1986
- Prime Minister: Kaysone Phomvihane
- Preceded by: Position established
- Succeeded by: Phoumi Vongvichit (acting)

President of the Standing Committee of the Supreme People's Assembly
- In office 2 December 1975 – 25 November 1986
- Prime Minister: Kaysone Phomvihane
- Preceded by: Position established
- Succeeded by: Sisomphone Lovansay (acting)
Kingdom of Laos Cabinet
Minister of Economy and Planning
In office 23 March 1962 – June 1974
| Monarch | Sisavang Vatthana |
| Prime Minister | Souvanna Phouma |
| Deputy | Khamfeuane Tounalom |
| Preceded by | Ngone Sananikone |
| Succeeded by | Position abolished |
Vice Prime Minister of Laos
In office 6 March 1967 – June 1974 Serving with Leuam Insixiengmay
| Monarch | Sisavang Vatthana |
| Prime Minister | Souvanna Phouma |
| Preceded by | Ngone Sananikone |
| Succeeded by | Position abolished |
In office 23 March 1962 – 22 May 1963 Serving with Phoumi Nosavan
| Monarch | Sisavang Vatthana |
| Prime Minister | Souvanna Phouma |
| Succeeded by | Position abolished |
Minister of Planning, Reconstruction, and Rural Development
In office 18 November 1957 – 23 July 1958
| Monarch | Sisavang Vong |
| Prime Minister | Souvanna Phouma |
| Preceded by | Leuam Insixiengmay |
| Succeeded by | Phoui Sananikone |
Minister of Construction and Rural Development
In office 21 March 1956 – 23 July 1957
| Monarch | Sisavang Vong |
| Prime Minister | Souvanna Phouma |
| Preceded by | Position established |
| Succeeded by | Phoui Sananikone |
President of the Laos National Assembly (Note: Additionally called “Chairman of the National Assembly”.)
In office May 1958 – July 1959 (Note: All Pathet Lao members of the National Assembly were arrested on charges of treason, however Souphanouvong's allegedly escaped the charges.)
| Succeeded by | Pheng Phongsavan |
Member of the National Assembly
In office May 1958 – Unknown
| Succeeded by |
Lao Issara Government (Note: Political movement and Government-in-Exile.)
Minister of Defence and Military Affairs
In office 15 April 1946 – August 1946
| Prime Minister | Khammao Vilay |
| Preceded by | Position established |
| Succeeded by | Tiao Kindavong |
Minister of Defence and Telecommunications
In office 12 October 1945 – 15 April 1946
| Prime Minister | Khammao Vilay |
| Preceded by | Position established |
| Succeeded by | Thongdee Sounthonevichit |

Personal details
- Born: 13 July 1909 Palace Sisouvanna, Xieng Dong, Luang-Prabang, Laos, French Indochina
- Died: 9 January 1995 (aged 85) Vientiane, Laos
- Resting place: Laotian National Revolutionary Cemetery
- Citizenship: Laotian; French (Note: Born during the French Protectorate, the people of Indochina, for the most part, would've been considered French subjects. However, Souphanouvong was a member of the Laotian aristocracy, was fluent in French, and studied in Paris.)
- Party: Lao People's Revolutionary Party
- Other political affiliations: Lao Front for National Development (Note: Coalition popular front.)
- Spouse: Nguyen Thi Ky Nam (m. 1938) (1921-2006)
- Relations: Lao royal family
- Parents: Prince Bounkhong; Mom Kham Ouane
- Relatives: Souvanna Phomma; Phetsarath Ratanavongsa; Souvanna Phouma
- Education: Lycée Albert Sarraut, Hanoi
- Alma mater: École nationale des ponts et chaussées
- Occupation: Politician; Revolutionary; Statesman
- Awards: See list
- Nickname: Red Prince

Military service
- Allegiance: Pathet Lao
- Commands: Lao Issara
- Battles/wars: Indochina Wars; • August Revolution; • Laotian Civil War

Prince Souphanouvong (13 July 1909 – 9 January 1995; Lao: ສຸພານຸວົງ Lao pronunciation: [ˌsupʰaːˈnuʋoŋ]), nicknamed the Red Prince, was, alongside his half-brother Prince Souvanna Phouma and Prince Boun Oum of Champasak, one of the "Three Princes" who represented respectively the communist (pro-Vietnam), neutralist, and royalist political factions in Laos. He served as the President of Laos from December 1975 to October 1986.

== Early life ==
Souphanouvong was born in Palace Sisouvanna, Xieng Dong, Luang Prabang. He was one of the sons of Prince Bounkhong, the last viceroy of Luang Prabang. Unlike his half-brothers, Souvanna Phouma and Phetsarath Ratanavongsa, whose mothers were of royal birth, his mother was a commoner, Mom Kham Ouane.

He attended the Lycée Albert Sarraut in Hanoi, subsequently studying civil engineering at the École nationale des ponts et chaussées in Paris and working at a port in Le Havre. After graduating in 1937, he returned to French Indochina and worked at the public works bureau in Nha Trang, where he was responsible for the construction of bridges and roads in central Vietnam and Laos. He worked as a civil engineer until 1945.

== Political activities ==
=== Anti-colonial movement ===
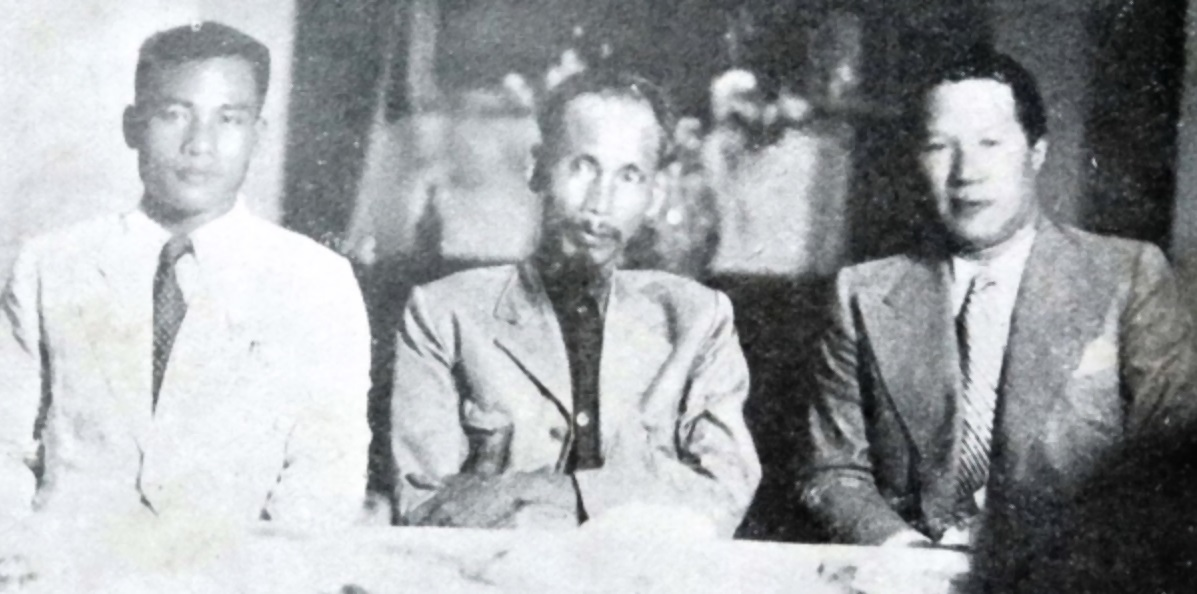
Souphanouvong (left) with Việt Minh leader Hồ Chí Minh (center) and former emperor of Vietnam Bảo Đại

After the Japanese surrendered at the end of World War II, he contacted the Việt Minh to seek their support for Lao independence against French colonial rule. In Hanoi, he also met with the leader of the Việt Minh, Hồ Chí Minh, who greatly impressed him. As a result, Souphanouvong joined the Indochinese communist movement and became one of the leaders of the Lao Issara national liberation movement. He first served as its provincial chairman in Thakhek, then as foreign minister of the Lao Issara government and commander-in-chief of the Army for the Liberation and Defense of Laos (Armée de libération et de défense lao).

Unlike other members of the national liberation movement, Souphanouvong believed that Laos could only liberate itself from French rule in alliance with the Việt Minh, and wanted the Lao Issara and the Việt Minh to unite in an Indochina-wide struggle against French rule. On 1 November 1945, Souphanouvong signed a Mutual Assistance Agreement between the Lao Issara and the Việt Minh. During the battle of Thakhek on 21 March 1946, Souphanouvong and his forces were defeated by the French and, as a result, he was wounded and fled across the Mekong River to Bangkok, Thailand. There, like other Lao Issara leaders, he remained in exile for the next three years. In March 1949 he resigned as foreign minister of the government-in-exile after conflicts over the issue of continued cooperation with the Việt Minh.

=== Leader of Pathet Lao ===
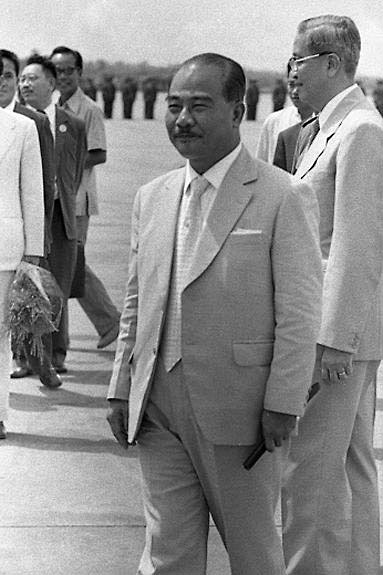
Souphanouvong in 1974

In August 1950, Souphanouvong convened the first congress of the Lao Freedom Front (Neo Lao Issara), more generally known as the Pathet Lao, which served as the vehicle for the communist challenge to French rule. It emerged from the radical wing of the Lao Issara in 1950 after the split and was supported by North Vietnam. On 13 August 1950, he was elected President of the Congress of the Lao Freedom Front, which met at the Việt Minh headquarters in Tuyen Quang, North Vietnam. As a result, he became famous under the name "The Red Prince." However, the movement was led by the communist politician Kaysone Phomvihane, and Souphanouvong was more of a figurehead in it.

Souphanouvong, at least initially, was not a committed communist. He joined the Pathet Lao because of personal conflicts with the Lao Issara leadership. In a conversation with a US diplomat in Bangkok in 1949, he described Laos as a "classless, Buddhist country in which communist theories had no basis." He proposed an independent Laos, with American help, as a neutral buffer against the spread of communism in Asia. It cannot be ruled out that Souphanouvong was actually unaware of his allies' intentions, as the close circle of leaders of the Vietnamese and Laotian communists was extremely secretive and kept their Marxist-Leninist program strictly secret from outsiders. Radical goals such as dispossession, class warfare and abolition of the monarchy would not have appealed to the vast majority of the Laotian population with their Buddhist beliefs. However, all of Souphanouvong's statements were treated with caution, since, according to two American contacts, he was a "perfect liar".

His pro-Vietnamese orientation was perhaps more decisive. He had spent much of his adult life studying and working in Vietnam, and was married to a Vietnamese woman. As a result, he had more interactions with Vietnamese than with Laotians of his generation, and arguably a greater intellectual affinity with educated Vietnamese, whom he perceived as more dynamic, than with Lao elites, whom he described as apolitical and passive. He was thus part of a tradition of many aristocrats in Lao history who sought the support of one of their two large neighbors—either Thailand or Vietnam—in order to gain or retain power.

Souphanouvong joined the Lao People's Party (which later became the Lao People's Revolutionary Party) in 1955, but was not part of its leadership. However, he became chairman of the Lao Patriotic Front (Neo Lao Hak Sat), which was founded in 1956, and in which trade unions, women's and peasant associations were also represented. During the national unity government under his neutralist half-brother Souvanna Phouma, he was Minister for Planning, Reconstruction and Urban Development from 1957 to 1958. In May 1958, he was elected MP for Vientiane in the National Assembly of Laos with the highest number of votes among all candidates nationwide.

However, the unity government collapsed, and the new government under Prime Minister Phoui Sananikone had Souphanouvong and other representatives of the Pathet Lao arrested in July 1959. In May 1960, the group managed to escape to the headquarters of the pro-communist forces at Sam Neua in Houaphan province. Souphanouvong continued to advocate for Pathet Lao-neutralist cooperation and contributed to the negotiations that led to the International Agreement on the Neutrality of Laos, which was signed in Geneva in 1962. In the second unity government that followed, Souphanouvong was appointed as Deputy Prime Minister and Minister of Economy and Planning. After the assassination of leftist Foreign Minister Quinim Pholsena on 1 April 1963, Souphanouvong left the government and retreated again to the Pathet Lao base in Sam Neua.

Only in 1967 did he publicly profess Marxism-Leninism. Whether this reflected his authentic ideological convictions or was a calculation of power remained questionable.

Souphanouvong tried again to create an alliance of Pathet Lao and neutralists to end the Laotian Civil War, in which his eldest son was killed. In 1972 and 1973, he was once more involved in talks that led to the third unity government, in which he took on no ministerial office. However, he presided over the National Political Consultative Council, which drafted the 18-point program that guided the government's policies.

=== President of the Lao People's Democratic Republic ===
He was elected President of the National Assembly from 1958 to 1959 following his success in the 1958 elections.

Upon its successful seizure of power in 1975, he became the first President of the Lao People's Democratic Republic, a position he held until 1991. After 1986, Phoumi Vongvichit acted in his stead as president, though Souphanouvong still retained the presidential title. Kaysone Phomvihane succeeded him as president in 1991. He was the President of the Supreme People's Assembly from 1975 to 1988.

In 1991, he became an advisor to the Party's Central Committee.

== Personal life ==
He was married to Nguyen Thi Ky Nam, a Vietnamese woman who was the daughter of a civil servant. The two had ten children. Souphanouvong spoke eight languages, including Greek and Latin. His son, Khamsay Souphanouvong, escaped the country and applied for political asylum in New Zealand in 2000.

Souphanouvong died on 9 January 1995 in Vientiane, due to a heart disease. Following his death, the Laotian government decreed five days of mourning in his honour.

He is celebrated by the leadership of the Lao People's Democratic Republic and its press organs as a hero and "light figure" of the revolution and the Laotian nation. Especially on his 95th birthday in 2004, officials have increasingly emphasized his role in recent Laotian history and his services to the revolution, independence and national interests as well as the preservation of peace. He was buried in a stupa next to the Pha That Luang, and in 2012, his remains were moved to the newly constructed national cemetery in Vientiane.

== Honours and awards ==
- Laos:
  - National Gold Medal
- People's Republic of Bulgaria:
  - Order of the Balkan Mountains
- Cuba:
  - Order of José Martí
  - Order of Playa Girón
- Czechoslovakia:
  - First Class of the Order of the White Lion
  - Order of Klement Gottwald (1989)
- Mongolian People's Republic:
  - Order of Sukhbaatar
- Soviet Union:
  - Order of the October Revolution
  - Order of Friendship of Peoples
  - Medal "For Strengthening of Brotherhood in Arms"
- Vietnam:
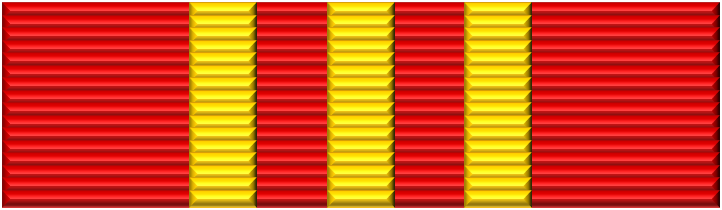
  - Order of Ho Chi Minh

Political offices
| Preceded by Sisavang Vatthana as King of Laos | President of Laos; Phoumi Vongvichit acting from 1986 to 1991; 1975–1991 | Succeeded by Kaysone Phomvihane |
Party political offices
| Preceded by None | President of the Lao Front for National Construction; 1979–1986 | Succeeded by Phoumi Vongvichit |
