= Bounkhong =

Prince Bounkhong
- Uparaja
- Born: 1857
- Died: July 26, 1920 (aged 62–63); Luang Phrabang
Names
- Prince Chao Maha Oupahat Bounkhong
- Father: Souvanna Phomma

Prince Bounkhong was the last uparaja of Luang Phrabang. He was granted the title of Chao Ratsaphakhinay by King Chulalongkorn of Siam in 1884. From 1911 to 1920, he was a member of the Government Council of French Indochina.

Chao Maha Oupahat Bounkhong was the father of Phetsarath, Souvanna Phouma, Souphanouvong, Souvannarath and Kindavong He died at Luang Phrabang on 26 July 1920, having had 11 sons and 13 daughters by 11 wives.

== Bibliography ==
- Lee, Khoon Choy (2013). Golden Dragon and Purple Phoenix: The Chinese and Their Multi-Ethnic Descendants in Southeast Asia. World Scientific. ISBN 978-981-4383-43-1.
