= Souvanna Phouma =

Laotian politician (1901–1984)

Prince Sir Souvanna Phouma SMN GCE GCMG GCS
- ສຸວັນນະພູມາ
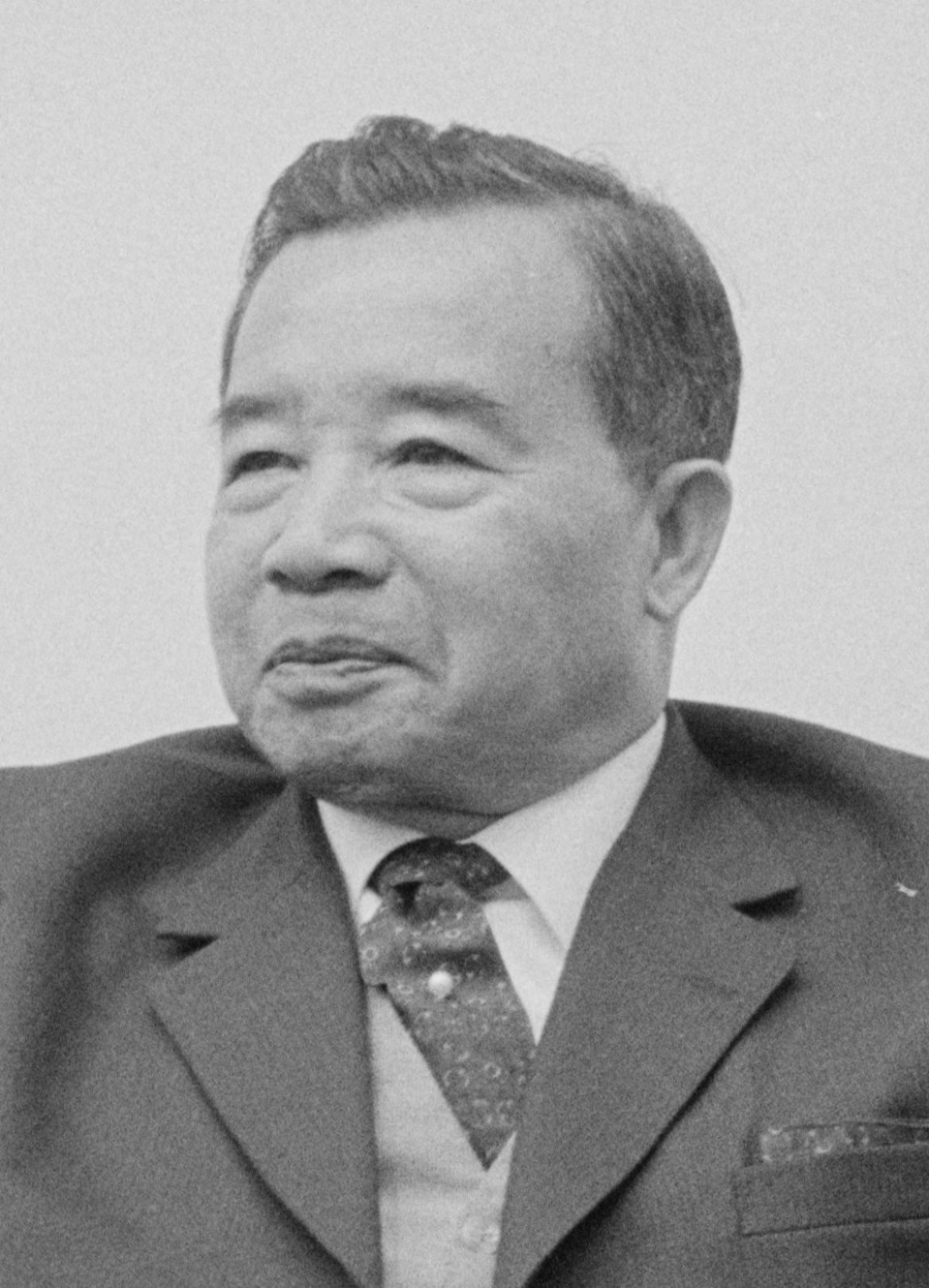
- Souvanna in 1969

7th Prime Minister of Laos
- In office 21 November 1951 – 20 October 1954
- Monarch: Sisavang Vong
- Preceded by: Phoui Sananikone
- Succeeded by: Katay Don Sasorith
- In office 21 March 1956 – 17 August 1958
- Preceded by: Katay Don Sasorith
- Succeeded by: Phoui Sananikone
- In office 30 August 1960 – 13 December 1960
- Monarch: Sisavang Vatthana
- Preceded by: Somsanith Vongkotrattana
- Succeeded by: Boun Oum
- In office 23 June 1962 – 2 December 1975
- Preceded by: Boun Oum
- Succeeded by: Kaysone Phomvihane

Personal details
- Born: 7 October 1901; Luang Prabang, Laos, French Indochina
- Died: 10 January 1984 (aged 82); Vientiane, Laos
- Political party: National Progressive Party; Lao Neutralist Party
- Spouse: Aline Claire Allard (m. 1933; div. 1969)

Prince Souvanna Phouma (Lao: ສຸວັນນະພູມາ; 7 October 1901 – 10 January 1984) was the leader of the neutralist faction and Prime Minister of the Kingdom of Laos several times (1951–1954, 1956–1958, 1960, and 1962–1975).

== Early life ==
Souvanna Phouma was the son of Bounkhong, the last vice-king of Luang Prabang and a nephew of King Sisavang Vong of Laos, given a French education in Hanoi, Paris and Grenoble, where he obtained his degree in architecture and engineering. He returned to his homeland in 1931, married Aline Claire Allard, the daughter of a French father and a Lao mother, and entered the Public Works Service of French Indochina.

Souvanna Phouma, together with his brother, Prince Phetsarath Rattanavongsa (1891–1959) and his half-brother, Prince Souphanouvong (1909–1995), around the end of World War II, joined the Lao Issara (Free Laos) movement established to counter the French occupation and its provisional Vientiane government (1945–46).

When the French reoccupied Laos, Souvanna fled to exile in Bangkok, but returned to Laos in 1949 as France began conceding autonomy to Laos.

Souvanna Phouma and his wife had four children including Mangkra Souvanna Phouma and Princess Moune, who married Perry J. Stieglitz, cultural-affairs attaché of the U.S. embassy.

== Premiership ==
In 1951, Souvanna became Prime Minister of Laos under the National Progressive Party banner with a landslide victory, winning 15 of the 39 seats in the National Assembly. He was prime minister until 1954.

After elections in December 1955, Souvanna Phouma returned to the prime ministership on a platform of national reconciliation. In August 1956 Souvanna and the Communist Pathet Lao—which his half-brother Souphanouvong headed—agreed on broad proposals for a 'government of national union'. Elections for 21 extra assembly seats were finally held in May 1958, with parties aligned with the Pathet Lao acquiring 13. Souphanouvong entered the government as Economic Minister. Another Pathet Lao leader, Phoumi Vongvichit, acquired the Ministry of Religion and Fine Arts.

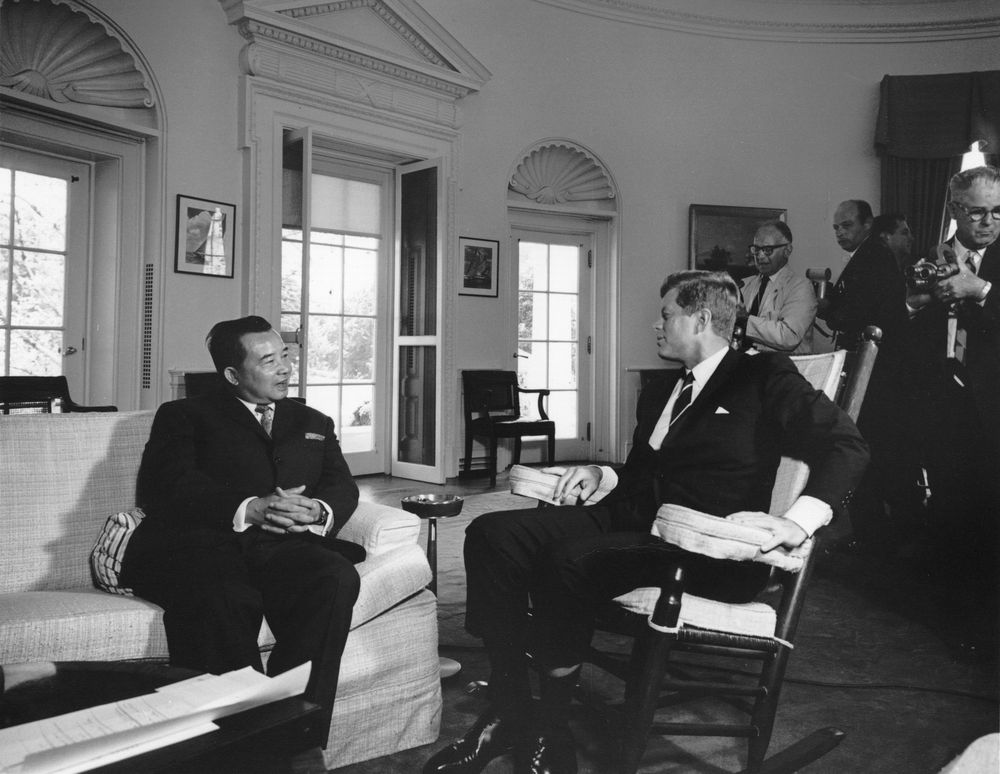
Prince Souvanna Phouma and US president John F. Kennedy in 1962

In June 1958 Souvanna was again forced to resign by the rightists. The king accepted the vote as legal the next day when he signed Royal Ordinance No. 282, dismissing Souvanna Phouma's government and giving powers provisionally to the Revolutionary Committee. Royal Ordinance No. 283, approved a provisional government formed by Prince Boun Oum, who acted as front man for Phoui Sananikone. He was one of the Three Princes, whom Sisavang Vatthana appointed to form a coalition government between the rightists and Pathet Lao but it collapsed, and the Laotian Civil War began.

Souvanna Phouma was elected President of National Assembly from May 1960 to August 1960 following the 1960 elections.

After the end of the civil war he became an advisor to the new Lao PDR government and died in Vientiane in 1984.

== Honours ==
- Kingdom of Laos: Grand Cross and Officer of the Order of the Million Elephants and the White Parasol
- Kingdom of Laos: Commander of the Order of Civic Merit of Laos
- Kingdom of Laos: Order of the Reign, Sisavang Vong and Sisavang Vatthana types
- France: Officier of the Legion of Honour
- Malaysia: Honorary Grand Commander of the Order of the Defender of the Realm (1971)
- Thailand: Knight Grand Cordon (Special Class) of the Order of the White Elephant
- Cambodia: Grand Cross of the Royal Order of Cambodia
- Japan: Grand Cordon of the Order of the Rising Sun
- Germany: Grand Cross 1st Class of the Order of Merit of the Federal Republic of Germany
- Philippines: Grand Collar of the Order of Sikatuna

Political offices
Preceded by Phoui Sananikone	Prime Minister of Laos; 1951–1954	Succeeded by Katay Don Sasorith
Preceded by Katay Don Sasorith	Prime Minister of Laos; 1956–1958	Succeeded by Phoui Sananikone
Preceded by Somsanith Vongkotrattana	Prime Minister of Laos; 1960	Succeeded by Boun Oum
Preceded by Boun Oum	Prime Minister of Laos; 1962–1975	Succeeded by Kaysone Phomvihane
