= List of political parties in Laos =

This article lists political parties in Laos.

Laos is a one-party state. This means that only one political party, the Lao People's Revolutionary Party (LPRP), is legally allowed to hold effective power. The Lao Front for National Development (LFND) serves as a mass organization affiliated with the LPRP and is tasked with involving non-party citizens in government and cultural affairs.

== Former political parties ==
- Committee for the Defence of National Interests (founded 1958)
- Democratic Party (founded 1951)
- Independent Party (founded 1950)
- Lao Socialist Party (exile group)
- Lao Neutralist Party (founded 1949)
- Peace and Neutrality Party (founded 1956)
- National Progressive Party (founded 1950)

== See also ==
- Politics of Laos
