= Prime Minister of Laos =

Head of government

Prime Minister of the Lao People's Democratic Republic
- ນາຍົກລັດຖະມົນຕີ ແຫ່ງ ສປປ ລາວ
- National emblem

- National flag

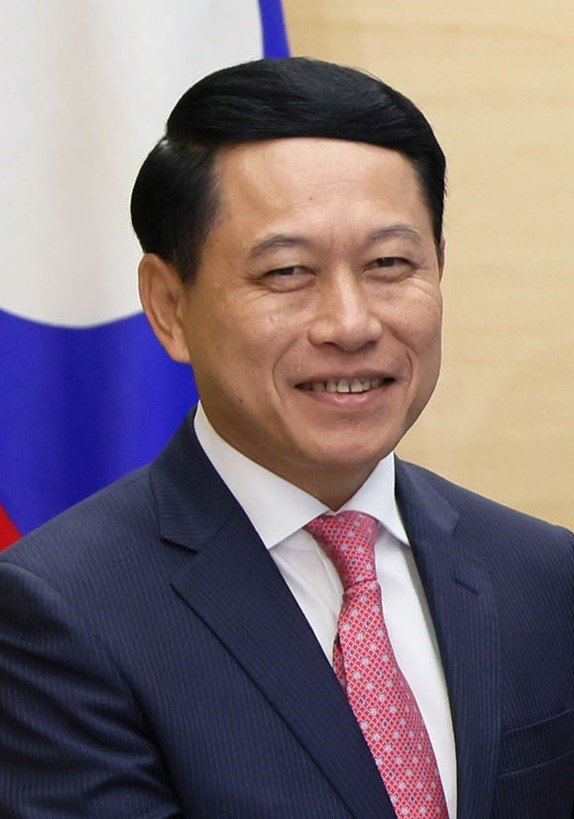
- Incumbent; Saleumxay Kommasith since 5 October 2026
- Supreme executive and administrative organ; Office of the Prime Minister
- Style: Your Excellency
- Type: Head of government
- Member of: LPRP Central Committee; LPRP Politburo
- Residence: Building of the Office of the Prime Minister
- Seat: Vientiane
- Nominator: President
- Appointer: National Assembly
- Term length: Maximum of two five-year terms
- Constituting instrument: Constitution of Laos; Law on Government
- Inaugural holder: Phetsarath Ratanavongsa
- Formation: 21 August 1941 (85 years ago)
- Deputy: Deputy Prime Minister

The prime minister of the Lao People's Democratic Republic, formerly the chairman of the Council of Government of the Lao People's Democratic Republic, is the head of government of Laos. The prime minister is accountable to the president, the National Assembly and the country's only legal party: the Lao People's Revolutionary Party (LPRP). The current prime minister is Saleumxay Kommasith, who was elected in 2026.

The Kingdom of Luang Phrabang was the first Laotian state to establish the office of prime minister. The Constitution of the Kingdom of Laos, ratified in 1947, established the post of prime minister of the Kingdom of Laos. The kingdom was abolished on 2 December 1975, when the National Congress of People's Representatives established the Lao People's Democratic Republic. The congress established the office of prime minister, forming the First Government on that day. The Supreme People's Assembly (SPA) approved the Law on the Council of Government, regulating the government's decision-making process, in 1982. The Constitution was approved on 14 August 1991, and the Prime Minister was made subordinate to the President.

Although the Constitution and the Law on Government do not stipulate any qualifications needed to be elected prime minister except for a minimum age of twenty, the law implies that the prime minister must be a member of the LPRP. Every prime minister since the communist seizure of power on 2 December 1975 has been a member of the LPRP Central Committee and the party's Politburo. Of the seven prime ministers since 1975, two served concurrently as LPRP general secretary; since 1998, however, the general secretary normally serves concurrently as the president.

The prime minister is nominated by the president and elected for a five-year term by the National Assembly. The nominee must receive a majority vote to be elected, and the officeholder can serve a maximum of two terms. The prime minister is responsible for controlling the government's apparatus and composition. They have the right to propose the appointment, reassignment, and removal of minister-level officials and provincial governors to the National Assembly, and is empowered to control and monitor central, provincial and municipal state bodies.

== History ==
=== Background ===
Laos' first head of government was Phetsarath Ratanavongsa, who was appointed Prime Minister of the Kingdom of Luang Phrabang on 15 August 1941. A French–Lao agreement established the Kingdom of Laos – the first unified, modern Laotian state – on 27 August 1946. A Constituent Assembly was formed to enact a new constitution. The Constitution of the Kingdom of Laos was enacted on 28 April 1947 by the Constituent Assembly, and was promulgated by royal decree on 11 May 1947. Under the new constitution, Laos was defined as "a unitary, indivisible and democratic kingdom"; Prince Souvannarat was the first prime minister of the Kingdom of Laos. Seven prime ministers served the Kingdom of Laos between 15 March 1947 and its 2 December 1975 dissolution.

=== Pre-constitutional period (1975–91) ===
The Lao People's Democratic Republic (Lao PDR) and the office of the prime minister were established on 2 December 1975 by a decision of the National Congress of People's Representatives (NCPR). All institutions of the Kingdom of Laos were replaced with institutions strongly influenced by those in other communist states, especially Vietnam. The NCP ordered the Supreme People's Assembly to "propel, assist and control all the activities of the government, to prepare a draft Constitution as well as propose laws which are indispensable and to strengthen the base of the new code of the law of the people's democratic state". The NCPR also gave the Lao People's Revolutionary Party (LPRP) a monopoly on state power. The Prime Minister, the government and the SPA (the supreme state organ of power) would implement party decisions. Lao People's Revolutionary Party general secretary Kaysone Phomvihane said in 1977, "Party committees at all levels must lead [in fulfilling] the revolutionary task in all domains, but the essential is to direct the power of the state. They must make [the state] secure and powerful, capable of applying the line and policies of the Party." According to scholar Chou Norindr, the political system made the government and supreme state organ of power subordinate to the party. This contrasts with liberal democratic societies, in which several parties compete for power and all are subject to state laws.

The governmental structure established on 2 December 1975 was named the Council of Government, like its Vietnamese counterpart. The council was responsible for the political, economic, cultural and social affairs of the state, and its security, defence and foreign relations. It was also responsible for increasing the state's economic performance, developing collective power and establishing a socialist mode of production. The Council of Government was the supreme power in administration and economic affairs.

The government had a hierarchy since its inception. Kaysone Phomvihane, the first prime minister of the Lao PDR, also served as LPRP general secretary and a member of the Politburo and Secretariat. His four deputy prime ministers (Nouhak Phoumsavanh, Phoumi Vongvichit, Khamtai Siphandon and Phoune Sipraseuth) served concurrently in the LPRP Politburo, the highest decision-making body between Central Committee meetings. Below them were members of the LPRP Central Committee and other party members. The presidency of the Council of Government, the highest governmental body, was composed of the prime minister, his deputies, and Saly Vongkhamsao, Sisavath Keobounphanh, Chanmy Douangboudy, Maychantane Sengmany and Thongsavat Khaykhamphitoune. Members of the presidency controlled the state's legislative, executive and judicial powers. The First Government's deputy prime ministers had wide-ranging responsibilities; they led their respective ministries and oversaw other ministries on behalf of the Prime Minister. With the Prime Minister, The First Government and prime minister reported their activities to the SPA (consisting mainly of LPRP members), which rarely held the government accountable.

The assembly passed the Law on the Council of Government, which stated that the Council of Government has the "full power to settle all matters of state management which do not fall under the duties and rights of the Supreme People's Assembly and the SPA Standing Committee", in November 1982. The law changed the prime minister's title to Chairman of the Council of Government, and the deputy prime ministers' to deputy chairmen of the Council of Government. It intended to strengthen the body's collegiality by emphasising collective leadership, a communist leadership principle which seeks to minimise arbitrary decision-making; "representatives of trade unions, youth and women may be invited" to the meetings of the Council of Government "for consultation on problems involving the masses of all strata to which each organisation is responsible". Ministers could also attend council meetings.

The Council of Government organised quarterly meetings of all ministers; between sessions of the Council of Government, the Standing Committee of the Council of Government met weekly. It was composed of the chairman, the first deputy chairman, deputy chairs, ministers and the head of the Office of Council of Government. The first deputy chairman acted for the chairman in his absence. The deputy chairmen, as before, supervised and coordinated the activities of ministries and governmental committees. Decrees, decisions and significant issues decided by the Council of Government (or its standing committee) had to be signed by the chairman to become effective; resolutions, decisions and instructions issued on less-critical matters could be signed by the chairman or first vice-chairman. One section of the law was devoted to the Office of the Council of Government, which was responsible for preparing the council's work, organising its meetings and implementing its decisions. The head of the Office of the Council of Government reported to the chairman and first deputy chairman, working on behalf of the council with the SPA and other organisations.

The absence of a constitution influenced Laos' institutions. Souphanouvong, the Chairman of the SPA Standing Committee, was elected Chairman of the SPA Constitutional Drafting Commission. Between 1975 and 1984, however, none of its work was made public. In 1984, the SPA announced the creation of two subcommittees of the Constitutional Drafting Commission. The lack of an institutionalised structure led the party to bypass state structures in decision-making; the LPRP Secretariat, for example, bypassed the SPA. It reshuffled the First Government in January 1982, in violation of the law. No explanation has been given for why it took so long to write a constitution; Vietnam approved a constitution four years after reunification, and the People's Republic of Kampuchea took two. Laos, influenced by reforms in Vietnam and the rest of the communist world by the mid-1980s, called for SPA elections in 1988. At the assembly's first plenary session, party leaders reported that the draft constitution was nearly finished. On 14 August 1991, the SPA adopted the first constitution of the Lao People's Democratic Republic.

=== Constitutional system (1991–present) ===
The new constitution changed the chairman of the Council of Government back to prime minister. It affirmed the LPRP's role, defining it as the "leading nucleus" of the state. The state's executive organ was strengthened. The Prime Minister's power was reduced, and the president's was increased; the Prime Minister had appointed provincial governors, but the president did under the new constitution. The President now had the right to appoint and dismiss the Prime Minister and ministers in accordance with the National Assembly. According to scholar Stephen T. Johnson, the new presidency was comparable to the President of France during the Fifth Republic. The prime minister was responsible for guiding the work of government ministries, committees, provincial governors and mayors.

The constitution was amended in 2013 and 2015. Amendments in 2013 were needed to "reflect the political and economic reality of contemporary Laos", and in 2015 it was amended to "respond to the Party's renovation policies and the country's development vision until 2030". The 2015 amendments gave the National Assembly the power to appoint and dismiss the prime minister and the government, removing from the president the power to appoint the prime minister.

== Qualifications and selection ==
The constitution stipulates in Article 23 that all "Lao citizens aged eighteen years and above have the right to vote and those aged twenty years and above have the right to be elected, except insane persons, persons with mental disorders and persons whose rights to vote and to be elected have been revoked by a court." The Law on the Government is silent on qualifications to be elected prime minister. According to Article 3, "The government operates on a principle of democratic centralism based on the Constitution and laws, having the Lao People's Revolutionary Party as the axle and having the Lao Front for National Construction, the mass organisations and the social organisations as the power [and] uses educational, economic, and administrative methods to manage the State and to manage the society and economy"; the prime minister and the government are selected on the premise that they implement party decisions.

Since the office was established, the prime minister has been a leading party official. From 1975 to 1991, when it was the most powerful state office, the LPRP general secretary served concurrently as prime minister. No LPRP General Secretary has concurrently served as prime minister since 1998 (except during leadership transitions), opting instead to hold the presidency. However, every prime minister since 1975 has been a member of the LPRP Central Committee and its Politburo. A Politburo member does not require a fixed rank to be elected prime minister; Sisavath Keobounphanh was ranked eighth, Bounnhang Vorachit fourth, Thongsing Thammavong third and Thongloun Sisoulith second in its hierarchy.

== Duties and rights ==
=== Term limits ===
The prime minister leads the state's executive organ. The government is composed of the prime minister, the deputy prime ministers, ministers and chairmen of ministries. The government's term of office is identical to that of the National Assembly: a maximum of five years. No government official can hold an office for more than two consecutive terms, and an individual can serve as prime minister for ten years. The sitting government leaves office when the successor government has received National Assembly approval. The prime minister can leave office during his or her term by resigning. The National Assembly confirms the prime minister's resignation if he is unable perform his duties.

=== Government ===
The constitution establishes the government's duties and responsibilities. The Law on Government clarifies the constitution, extending the government's rights. Both documents state that the government is responsible for implementing the constitution. The government ensures the implementation of laws and resolutions enacted by the National Assembly, and decrees and presidential edicts approved by the Standing Committee of the National Assembly. The government is empowered to submit draft laws to the assembly, suggest draft presidential edicts to the assembly's standing committee and the president, and submit draft presidential decrees.

The government has the right to issue decrees and resolutions on economic and social management, the administrative structure of the state, and the management of science and technology. The same rights apply to national resources, the environment, defence, security and foreign affairs. The government can establish socioeconomic plans and a state budget, submitting them to the National Assembly for consideration. The government has the right to examine and question determinations, amendments and annulments passed by the National Assembly, and the assembly's decisions on taxation; it can make recommendations to the National Assembly and its standing committee, and propose fees and service charges to the committee.

With National Assembly approval, the government can establish, consolidate, separate and liquidate ministries, ministerial bodies, provinces and cities. It can recommend changes to the boundaries of cities and provinces to the National Assembly. The government can recommend establishing, merging, separating or abolishing a sub-ministry, department or department-level body. At the proposal of a provincial governor or provincial-capital mayor, the government can establish or abolish districts, municipalities, and district and municipal boundaries with the approval of the relevant provincial People's Assembly. It can also establish or abolish special and specific economic zones.

The government is responsible for promoting, disseminating and implementing the constitution, instilling respect for it, and implementing approved laws and regulations. It is empowered to control and monitor organisations, local administrative bodies, and defence and security forces to safeguard the constitution, laws and regulations. The government is responsible for the equal protection of its citizens, and has the right to make, enter into, interpret and implement international treaties.

It is the government's duty to protect the rights of citizens, including those living abroad. It is constitutionally empowered to bestow and revoke citizenship. It can grant a foreigner the status of an honorary person, and can propose amnesty to the president.

=== Role and authority ===
As the head of government, the prime minister calls government meetings and presides over them. The Law on Government gives the prime minister the right to direct and control the government's activities and delegate work to ministries, ministry-level organisations, other organisations under government supervision, and local administration. The prime minister directs and monitors the implementation of resolutions, the five-year plan, the state budget, and regulations approved by the Standing Committee of the National Assembly.

They have the right to change the composition of the government, proposing the appointment, reassignment, or dismissal of a deputy prime minister, minister or head of a ministry-level department to the National Assembly. With National Assembly approval, the prime minister can also appoint, reassign or remove a deputy minister, deputy head of the ministry-level department, the head or deputy head of a bureau, assistant minister, assistant head of a ministry-level department, head of a department or head of a department-level organisation. At the provincial and local levels, the prime minister can propose the appointment or dismissal of provincial governors, deputy governors, mayors, deputy mayors or district governors to the provincial People's Assembly and its standing committee. In the armed forces, the prime minister can promote or demote colonels and propose to the president the promotion or demotion of generals. They can propose to the president the appointment or recall of Laotian ambassadors and plenipotentiaries.

With National Assembly approval, the prime minister can approve, annul, and withdraw from international treaties. The prime minister can propose to the National Assembly's Standing Committee the rectification of treaties, and can assign a minister and head of a ministry-level organisation to execute international treaties on behalf of the state.

They can issue decrees, orders and decisions on the implementation of policies, laws, regulations and state plans, and on the establishment and operation of ministries, ministry-level organisations, local administration and other government-level organisations. The head of government can temporarily prevent, terminate and annul decisions of a ministry, local administration and organisations under government supervision if they contradict laws and regulations, except for public prosecutor and People's Supreme Court decisions on legal proceedings. The Prime Minister may summarise and report on the government's operation annually to the president and the National Assembly.

== List of prime ministers ==
=== Prime ministers of the Kingdom of Laos ===
No.	Prime Minister		Term of office			Political party	Monarch (Reign)
No.	Portrait	Name (Lifespan)	Took office	Left office	Time in office	Political party	Monarch (Reign)
1		Prince; Phetsarath Ratanavongsa ເຈົ້າເພັດຊະຣາດ ຣັຕນະວົງສາ (1890–1959) (Note: Under a Japanese puppet state after 8 April 1945. Proclaimed Head of State by Lao Issara on 12 October 1945.)	21 August 1941	10 October 1945	4 years, 50 days	Non-partisan	King; Sisavang Vong (1904–1945)
—		Phaya Khammao ພະຍາ ຄຳມ້າວ (1892–1965) (Note: Until 25 October 1949 in exile in Bangkok, Thailand.)	12 October 1945	23 April 1946	193 days	Lao Issara	Prince; Phetsarath Ratanavongsa (1945–1946)
2		Prince; Kindavong ເຈົ້າກິນດາວົງສ໌ (1900–1951)	23 April 1946	15 March 1947	326 days	Non-partisan	King; Sisavang Vong (1946–1959)
3		Prince; Souvannarath ເຈົ້າສຸວັນນະຣາດ (1893–1960)	15 March 1947	25 March 1948	1 year, 10 days	Non-partisan	King; Sisavang Vong (1946–1959)
4		Prince; Boun Oum ບຸນອຸ້ມ ນະ ຈຳປາສັກ (1911–1980)	25 March 1948	24 February 1950	1 year, 305 days	Non-partisan	King; Sisavang Vong (1946–1959)
5		Phoui Sananikone ຜຸຍ ຊະນະນິກອນ (1903–1983)	24 February 1950	15 October 1951	1 year, 233 days	Independent Party	King; Sisavang Vong (1946–1959)
6		Crown Prince; Sisavang Vatthana ເຈົ້າສີສະຫວ່າງວັດທະນາ (1907–1978)	15 October 1951	21 November 1951	37 days	Non-partisan	King; Sisavang Vong (1946–1959)
7		Prince; Souvanna Phouma ເຈົ້າສຸວັນນະພູມາ (1901–1984)	21 November 1951	25 October 1954	2 years, 338 days	National Progressive Party	King; Sisavang Vong (1946–1959)
8		Katay Don Sasorith ກະຕ່າຍ ໂດນສະໂສລິດ (1904–1959)	25 October 1954	21 March 1956	1 year, 148 days	National Progressive Party	King; Sisavang Vong (1946–1959)
(7)		Prince; Souvanna Phouma ເຈົ້າສຸວັນນະພູມາ (1901–1984)	21 March 1956	17 August 1958	2 years, 149 days	National Progressive Party	King; Sisavang Vong (1946–1959)
(5)		Phoui Sananikone ຜຸຍ ຊະນະນິກອນ (1903–1983)	17 August 1958	31 December 1959	1 year, 136 days	Lao People's Rally	King; Sisavang Vong (1946–1959)
(5)		Phoui Sananikone ຜຸຍ ຊະນະນິກອນ (1903–1983)	17 August 1958	31 December 1959	1 year, 136 days	Lao People's Rally	King; Sisavang Vatthana (1959–1975)
—		General; Sounthone Pathammavong ສູນທອນ ປະຖຳມະວົງ (1911–1985)	31 December 1959	7 January 1960	7 days	Committee for the Defence of National Interests / Military	King; Sisavang Vatthana (1959–1975)
9		Kou Abhay ກຸ ອະໄພ (1892–1964)	7 January 1960	3 June 1960	148 days	Non-partisan	King; Sisavang Vatthana (1959–1975)
10		Prince; Somsanith Vongkotrattana ເຈົ້າສົມສະນິດ ວົງກົຕຣັຕນະ (1913–1975)	3 June 1960	15 August 1960	73 days	Committee for the Defence of National Interests	King; Sisavang Vatthana (1959–1975)
(7)		Prince; Souvanna Phouma ເຈົ້າສຸວັນນະພູມາ (1901–1984) (Note: From 9 December 1960 in exile in Phnom Penh, Cambodia.)	30 August 1960	13 December 1960	105 days	Lao People's Rally	King; Sisavang Vatthana (1959–1975)
		Quinim Pholsena ກວີນິມ ພົລເສນາ (1915–1963) (not recognized)	11 December 1960	13 December 1960	2 days	Peace and Neutrality Party	King; Sisavang Vatthana (1959–1975)
(4)		Prince; Boun Oum ບຸນອຸ້ມ ນະ ຈຳປາສັກ (1911–1980)	13 December 1960	23 June 1962	1 year, 192 days	Non-partisan	King; Sisavang Vatthana (1959–1975)
(7)		Prince; Souvanna Phouma ເຈົ້າສຸວັນນະພູມາ (1901–1984)	23 June 1962	2 December 1975	13 years, 162 days	Lao Neutralist Party	King; Sisavang Vatthana (1959–1975)

=== Prime ministers of the Lao People's Democratic Republic ===
No.	Portrait	Name (Birth–Death)	Term of office			President(s)
No.	Portrait	Name (Birth–Death)	Took office	Left office	Time in office	President(s)
1		Kaysone Phomvihane ໄກສອນ ພົມວິຫານ (1920–1992)	8 December 1975	15 August 1991	15 years, 250 days	Souphanouvong
1		Kaysone Phomvihane ໄກສອນ ພົມວິຫານ (1920–1992)	8 December 1975	15 August 1991	15 years, 250 days	Phoumi Vongvichit
2		Khamtai Siphandone ຄຳໄຕ ສີພັນດອນ (1924–2025)	15 August 1991	16 February 1998	6 years, 193 days	Kaysone Phomvihane
2		Khamtai Siphandone ຄຳໄຕ ສີພັນດອນ (1924–2025)	15 August 1991	16 February 1998	6 years, 193 days	Nouhak Phoumsavanh
3		Sisavath Keobounphanh ສີສະຫວາດ ແກ້ວບຸນພັນ (1928–2020)	16 February 1998	27 March 2001	3 years, 31 days	Khamtai Siphandone
4		Bounnhang Vorachit ບຸນຍັງ ວໍລະຈິດ (born 1937)	27 March 2001	8 June 2006	5 years, 73 days	Khamtai Siphandone
5		Bouasone Bouphavanh ບົວສອນ ບຸບຜາວັນ (born 1954)	8 June 2006	23 December 2010	4 years, 198 days	Choummaly Sayasone
6		Thongsing Thammavong ທອງສິງ ທຳມະວົງ (born 1944)	23 December 2010	20 April 2016	5 years, 119 days	Choummaly Sayasone
7		Thongloun Sisoulith ທອງລຸນ ສີສຸລິດ (born 1945)	20 April 2016	22 March 2021	4 years, 336 days	Bounnhang Vorachith
8		Phankham Viphavanh ພັນຄຳ ວິພາວັນ (born 1951)	22 March 2021	30 December 2022	1 year, 283 days	Thongloun Sisoulith
9		Sonexay Siphandone ສອນໄຊ ສີພັນດອນ (born 1966)	30 December 2022	5 October 2026	3 years, 279 days	Thongloun Sisoulith
10		Saleumxay Kommasith ສະເຫຼີມໄຊ ກົມມະສິດ (born 1968)	5 October 2026	Incumbent	3 days	Thongloun Sisoulith
