= 1958 Laotian parliamentary election =

Parliamentary elections were held in Laos on 4 May 1958, in order to elect an additional 21 seats to the enlarged National Assembly, the lower chamber of Parliament. The Lao Patriotic Front won the most seats, although the ruling National Progressive Party remained the largest party in the Assembly, holding 26 of the 60 seats. Voter turnout was 82%.

== Results ==
Party	Votes	%	Seats			
Party	Votes	%	Existing	Won	Total	+/–
Lao Patriotic Front			0	9	9	New
Peace and Neutrality Party			0	4	4	New
National Progressive Party			22	4	26	+4
Independent Party			7	0	7	0
Democratic Party			3	–	3	0
Lao National Union Party			2	–	2	0
Independents			5	4	9	+4
Total			39	21	60	+21
Total votes	689,598	–				
Registered voters/turnout	840,197	82.08				
Source: Nohlen et al.

== Aftermath ==
The resounding success of the Lao Patriotic Front and its allies in winning thirteen of the 21 seats changed the political atmosphere in Vientiane. This success had less to do with the LPF's adroitness than with the ineptness of the old-line nationalists, more intent on advancing their personal interests than on meeting the challenge from the LPF. The two largest parties, the National Progressive Party and the Independent Party, could not agree on a list of common candidates in spite of repeated prodding by the United States embassy and so split their votes among dozens of candidates. The LPF and Peace and Neutrality Party carefully worked out a strategy of mutual support, which succeeded in winning nearly two-thirds of the seats with barely one-third of the votes cast. Souphanouvong garnered the most votes and became chairman of the National Assembly. The Progressive Party and the Independent Party tardily merged to become the Lao People's Rally.

In the wake of the election fiasco, Washington concentrated on finding alternatives to Souvanna Phouma's strategy of winning over the Pathet Lao and on building up the Royal Lao Army as the only cohesive nationalist force capable of dealing with the communists' united front tactics. On 10 June 1958, a new political grouping called the Committee for the Defense of the National Interests (CDNI) made its appearance. Formed mainly of a younger generation not tied to the big families and as yet untainted by corruption, it announced a program for revitalizing the economy, forming an anticommunist front that excluded the Pathet Lao, suppressing corruption, and creating a national mystique.

Washington, which was paying the entire salary cost of the Royal Lao Army, was enthusiastic about the "young Turks" of the CDNI. This enthusiasm was not altogether shared by United States ambassador Horace H. Smith, who asked what right a group untested by any election had to set its sights on cabinet appointments. Whereas Souvanna Phouma tried and failed to form a government, creating a drawn-out cabinet crisis, Phoui Sananikone eventually succeeded and included four CDNI members and Phoumi Nosavan in a subcabinet post.
