= Kindavong =

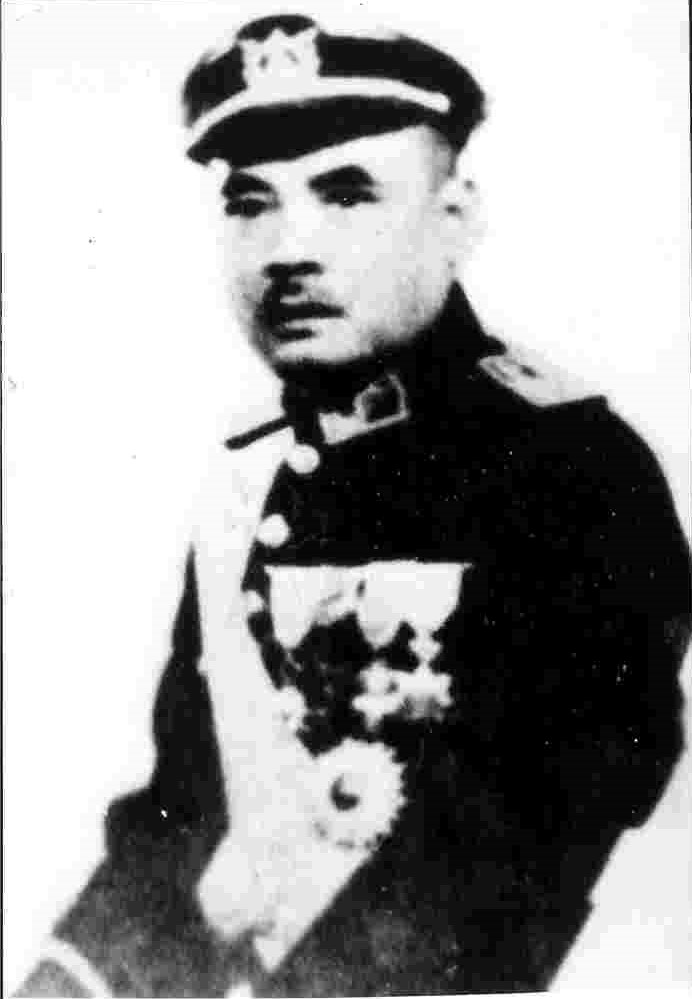
Prince Kindavong

Prince Kindavong (Lao: ເຈົ້າກິດາວົງ; 1900 in Laos – 30 March 1951) was a Laotian politician, prince, and the younger half-brother of Phetsarath Ratanavongsa. During World War II he was secretly sent by King Sisavang Vong to represent Laos to the Allied forces following the Japanese occupation of Laos and the royal capital at Luang Prabang on 7 April 1945. He later became the 2nd Prime Minister of Laos from April 23, 1946 to March 15, 1947.

Political offices
Preceded by Phaya Khammao	Prime Minister of Laos; 1946–1947	Succeeded by Souvannarath
