= Operation Booster Shot =

1958 U.S. aid program in Laos

- Part of 1960 Laotian elections, Laotian Civil War
- Type: Rural aid program
- Location: Laos
- Planned by: J. Graham Parsons
- Commanded by: Rufus C. Phillips, Horace H. Smith
- Objective: Convince rural populace to support US-backed politicians
- Date: March 1958 – April 27, 1958
- Executed by: 483d Troop Carrier Wing, Air America
- Outcome: Logistic success; however, electoral gains made by Communist candidates

Operation Booster Shot was a rural aid program run by the United States in the Kingdom of Laos between March and April 1958. Its purpose was to influence Lao peasantry to vote during May National Assembly elections for those politicians the U.S. favored. Because of the lack of roads in Laos, Booster Shot became an air delivery operation. It proceeded somewhat haphazardly due to rushed planning. Although logistically successful, the result was an electoral victory by the communist candidates opposed to the U.S..

Subsequently, right wing Assembly members organized against the newly elected communists. Also, the Programs Evaluation Office in the American embassy gained an aerial delivery section; this was the beginning of extensive air operations in Laos.

== Background ==
As the First Indochina War ended in French defeat, the 1954 Geneva Conference agreed on neutrality for the newly independent Kingdom of Laos. In January 1955, a United States Operations Mission was established in the American embassy in Vientiane. It spent $1.4 million on such civic action projects as schools, administrative training, farming, and public health, and about four times that in military aid.

== The rural aid campaign ==
As a result of the Geneva Conference, elections were held in Laos in December 1955. Although closed out of the two northeastern Pathet Lao-occupied provinces, votes were cast in the other ten provinces of Laos. However, no clear majority emerged from the election. Those in power remained until a follow-up election could be held.

In preparation to new elections due on 24 April 1960, the Royal Lao Government sent 5,000 troops electioneering on Operation Cleansweep through Military Region 4 for six weeks prior to the election.

American Ambassador to Laos J. Graham Parsons was faced with the prospect of Pathet Lao communists running legally in the elections provided for by the Geneva Conference. Maintaining discipline, the leftists proposed a single candidate for each office. On the other side of the political spectrum, by February the rightists were running 85 candidates for the same 21 seats.

The United States had pumped $202 million in foreign aid into Laos since 1955. The Pathet Lao were electioneering on a platform of peace, national unity, and a cleanup of corruption. Prince Phetsarath Ratanavongsa blamed Americans for inflation of the Lao kip, as well as causing governmental fraud. Worried that the non-communists who were favored by America were going to do poorly, Parsons began a crash rural aid program; he named it Booster Shot. Programs were selected to give "immediate and tangible political benefits" to those Lao politicians the U.S. favored. Central Intelligence Agency officer Rufus C. Phillips was placed in charge. He hired ten man teams to carry out Booster Shot. Each team had two specialists in each of five fields—farming, schools, public works, health, and information. In contrast to the usual low-key approach that allowed credit for the aid to redound to host government, Booster Shot was high-profile. While the State Department had envisioned air drops from unmarked aircraft, newly arrived ambassador Horace H. Smith took charge and not only insisted on using obviously American aircraft, but on affixing U.S. symbols on the aid packages. Bulldozers were parachuted with both American and Lao flags streaming from them. Smith wanted the U.S. help to be evident to the Lao populace.

The roads in Laos were scanty and abysmal, leaving aircraft as the alternative. The Royal Lao Air Force being incapable of air delivery of the civic action supplies, another carrier had to be found. The U.S. 483rd Troop Carrier Wing of C-119 Flying Boxcars was forwarded from Ashiya Air Base, Japan. The C-119s were augmented by two new C-130 Hercules detailed to the specific task of air-dropping a pair of bulldozers. The wing was tasked to airlift 37 tons (33.6 metric tons) of freight from Bangkok to Laos, and with airdropping 23 tons (20.9 metric tons) of supplies.

The airlift mission arrived on station on 31 March 1958. In four days, they finished their assignment. Then, before they could depart, they found themselves charged with another phase of Booster Shot. This had its difficulties. Although prepared for their initial task, the 483rd was unready for operations beyond that. Some of their aircraft were coming due for maintenance; two were scheduled for immediate care in Japan after returning from the planned week's exercise. Additionally, the second phase cargo lists were still being gathered from disparate U.S. agencies in Laos. Obsolete maps caused problems locating drop zones.

On 4 April, the 483rd contingent moved to Vientiane, Laos, in an effort to conserve flying hours on the C-119s. To disguise the fact they were U.S. Air Force members illicitly in country, the airmen donned civilian clothing. Military ranks were dropped as a salutation; thus began a custom that lasted as long as the Air Force was secretly involved in Laos.

Two of the three C-119s flew their last allowable hours the following day, and left for Japan for maintenance. Phase two of Booster Shot would continue with a scratch lot of scrounged craft, including C-124 Globemasters. Air America flew 72 sorties. However, the flights were a logistic success. They moved 1,135 tons (1,030 metric tons) of materiel and airdropped 300 tons (272 metric tons) into 50 rural sites. Over 90 projects had been supplied when the air drops ended 27 April 1958. Work on the projects would continue through the election, ending 23 May.

== Results ==
While Ambassador Smith predicted the leftists would win only three or four seats, communist propaganda took credit for the Booster Shot air drops. It was claimed that heavy equipment and supplies dropped in northern Laos were actually aid from the Chinese communist neighbors. The Pathet Lao also claimed that the air drops were a short-lived attempt to buy votes. Given the Lao government's treatment of the peasantry, that was a compelling argument. One missive read:

"You see, little villagers? Now that your votes are precious to the government, you are being showered with gifts....If the government is so rich that it can now give away these things to you, you can imagine how much the government has put away in its coffers for the past years, depriving you of your rightful share of American aid."

In the event, there were miscues, such as parachuting leather shoes into trackless areas that spent months muddied by the rainy season. The airlift may have been considered a success, despite its difficulties. However, the election results seemed disastrous. With 21 National Assembly seats up for grabs, the Pathet Lao won nine and their fellow leftist allies four more. Although eight of their members were already seated, numbers still did not quite favor them in the 59-seat Assembly.

In reaction, entrenched right wing politicians formed the Comité pour la défense des intérêts nationaux to counter the communists. The new committee worked closely with the new prime minister, Phoui Sananikone.

In June 1958, Ambassador Smith reported to the State Department that Booster Shot "has had a greater impact on Laos than any other aid program which the United States has undertaken in this area to date".

The efficacy of aerial resupply operations in Laos having been proven, a six-man support section was set up in the embassy's Programs Evaluation Office on 16 October 1958 to manage further airlifts.

Souvanna Phouma pointed out to the Americans that the election results weren't so unfavorable after all. He also declared that the election finally satisfied the provisions of the 1954 Geneva Conference.
