= 1951 Laotian parliamentary election =

- 18 August 1951
- All 39 seats in National Assembly; 20 seats needed for a majority
Party	Leader	Seats
National Progressive Party	Souvanna Phouma	19
Independent Party	Phoui Sananikone	10
Democratic Party	Kou Voravong	4
Lao National Union Party	Bong Souvannavong	2
Independents		4
This lists parties that won seats. See the complete results below.
Prime Minister before	Prime Minister after
Phoui Sananikone; Independent Party	Souvanna Phouma; National Progressive Party

Parliamentary elections were held in Laos on 18 August 1951 to elect members of the National Assembly, the lower chamber of Parliament. Unlike previous elections, which had been held on a non-partisan basis, this one saw political parties compete for the first time. The election was held while Laos was still a member state of the French Union, two years before the Franco–Lao Treaty of Amity and Association transferred the remaining French powers to the Royal Lao Government.

The result was a victory for the National Progressive Party, which won 19 of the 39 seats, one seat short of a majority of its own. Prince Souvanna Phouma formed a government that was invested on 21 November 1951.

== Results ==
Party	Votes	%	Seats
National Progressive Party			19
Independent Party			10
Democratic Party			4
Lao National Union Party			2
Independents			4
Total			39
Registered voters/turnout	233,119	–	
Source: Nohlen et al.
