= Lao National Union Party =

Defunct political party in Laos

The Lao National Union Party (Lao: ລາວລວມສຳພັນ, romanized: Lao Ruam Samphanh) was a Buddhist Socialist political party in Laos.

== History ==
The party was established by Bong Souvannavong on 22 September 1947. It won two of the 39 seats in the 1951 elections and retained both in the 1955 elections. It failed to win a seat in the 1958 supplementary elections and lost parliamentary representation following the 1960 elections.
