= Beijing Bayi School =

School in Haidian, Beijing, China

Coordinates: 39.976383°N 116.298495°E

- logo
- Simplified Chinese: 北京市八一学校
- Traditional Chinese: 北京市八一學校
Transcriptions
Standard Mandarin
- Hanyu Pinyin: Běijīng Shì Bā Yī Xuéxiào
- Wade–Giles: Pei-ching Shih Pa I Hsüeh-hsiao
- Yale Romanization: BěiJīng Shr̀ BāYī SywéSyàu

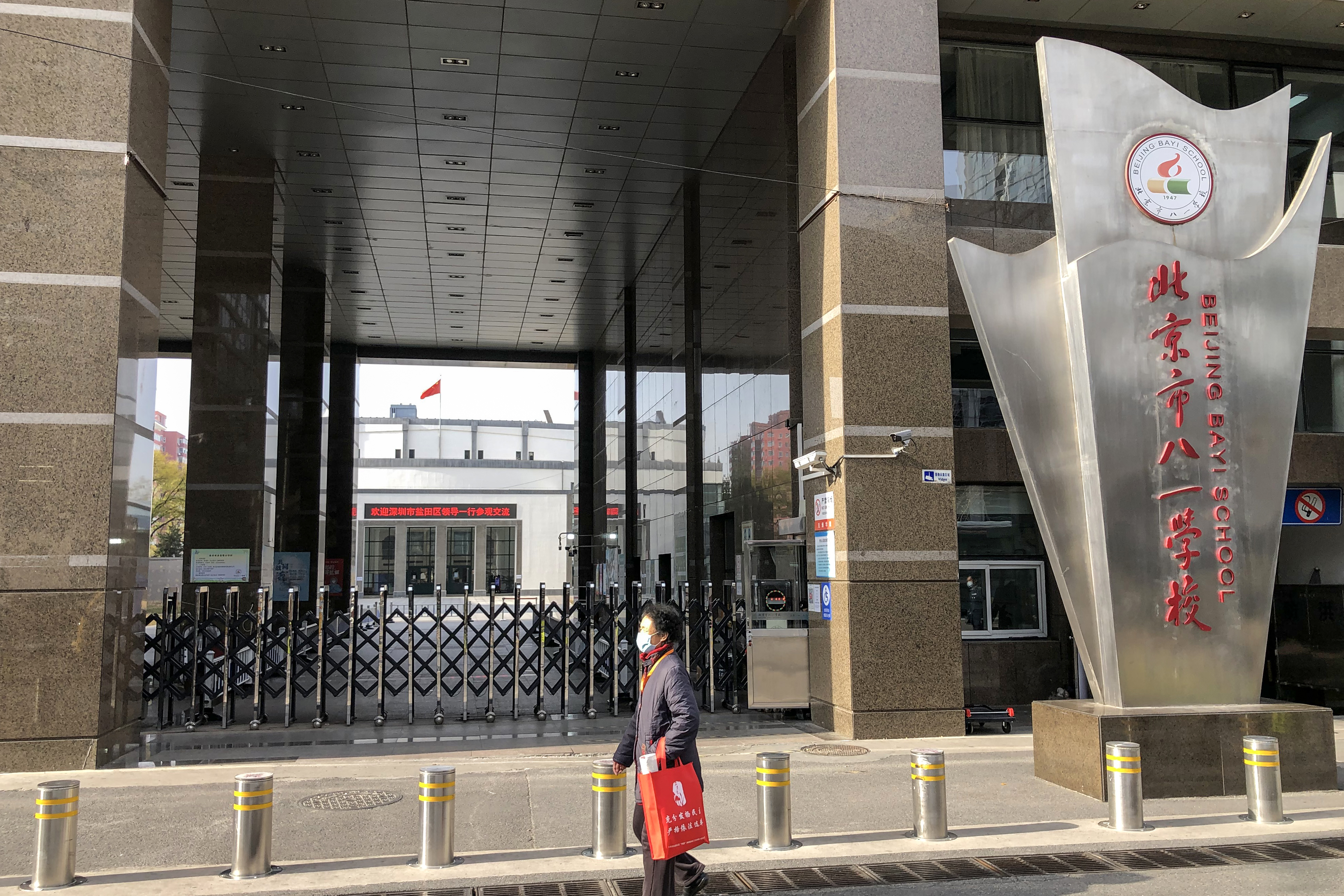
East gate

Beijing Bayi School (Chinese: 北京市八一学校), also known as the August 1st School, is a public elementary through high school with three campuses in Haidian, Beijing.

== History ==
Nie Rongzhen established the school in 1947.

From 2013, the private Shattuck-Saint Mary's School in Minnesota, United States, operated an expansion campus in the Bayi School. The partnership ended in 2016 over disagreements regarding control and funding.

== Campuses ==
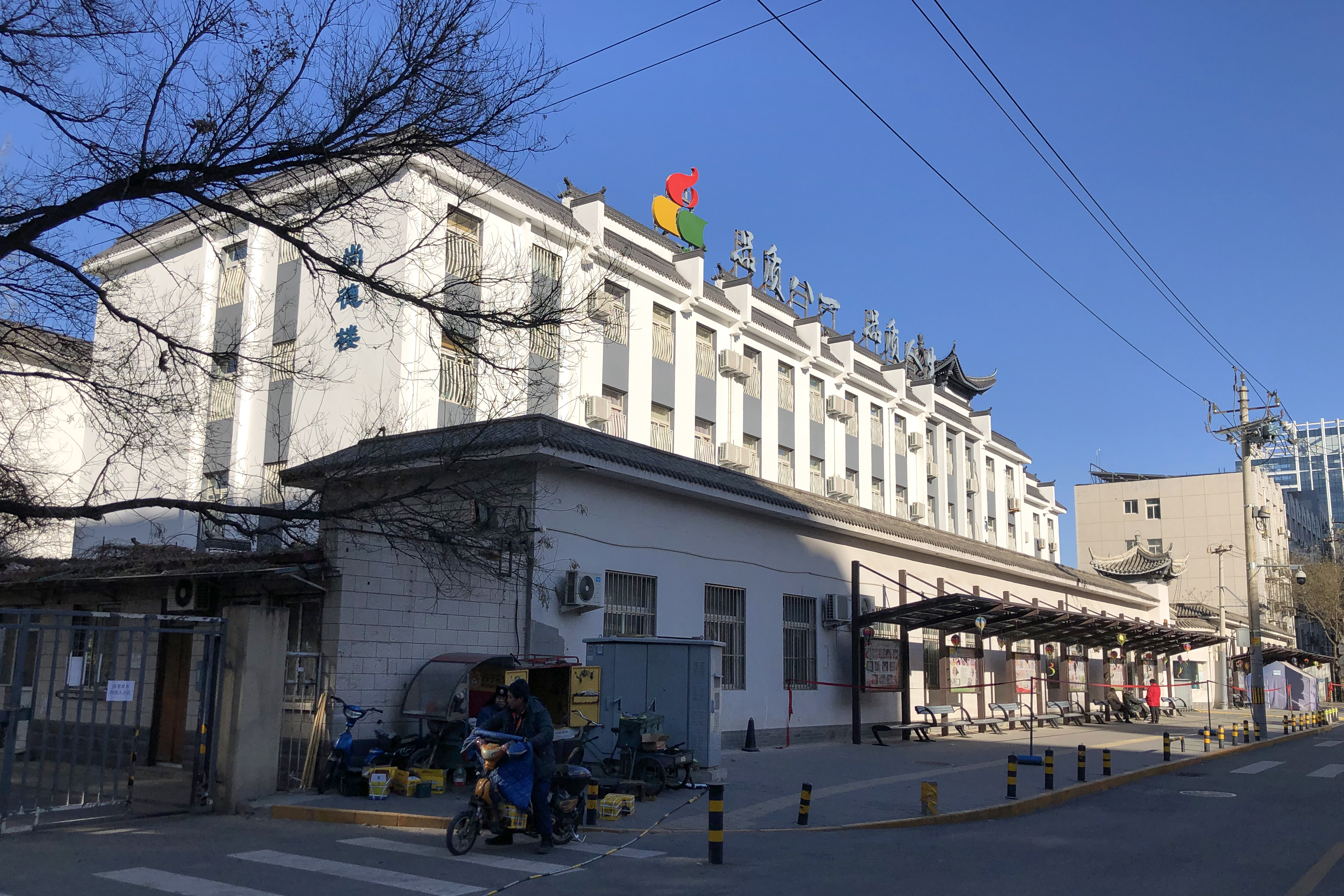
North campus, formerly the Wanquanhe Middle School

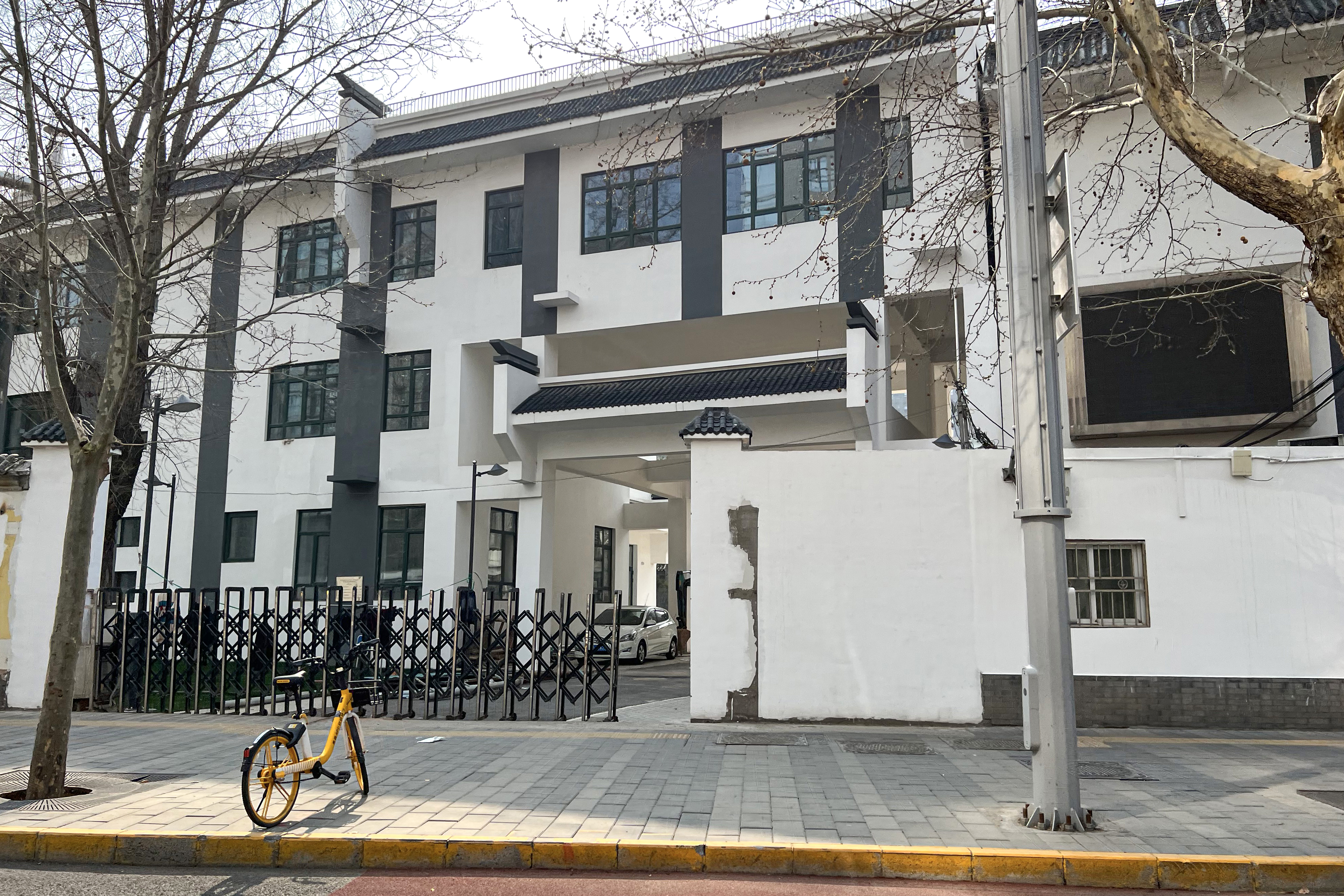
Elementary campus, formerly the Caihefang Primary School

The school has three campuses: Main, North, and Elementary.

The original campus was in a building that previously functioned as a residence for a prince who lived in the Qing Dynasty. It is about 10 kilometers (6.2 mi) north of Zhongnanhai, the residential facility for the top leadership of China.

== Cultural Revolution ==
Tetsushi Takahashi of Nikkei Shimbun wrote that Beijing Bayi School is "prestigious". Evan Osnos of New Yorker wrote that the "exclusive" Beijing Bayi School was known as the "cradle of leaders" (领袖摇篮; lǐngxiù yáolán). Takahashi stated that in the era prior to the Cultural Revolution, descendants of the leaders of the Chinese Communist Party, known as "second-generation reds", were enrolled at Beijing Bayi School. Osnos wrote that in the pre-Cultural Revolution period the pupils "formed a small, close-knit élite; they lived in the same compounds, summered at the same retreats, and shared a sense of noblesse oblige." Mi Hedu, author of The Red Guard Generation, wrote that pre-Cultural Revolution pupils "compared one another on the basis of whose father had a higher rank, whose father rode in a better car."

== Notable alumni ==
- Xi Jinping, general secretary of the Chinese Communist Party and paramount leader of China since 2012 - attended at the elementary and junior high school levels, graduated in 1968
- Khemmani Pholsena, daughter of former Lao Minister of Foreign Affairs Quinim Pholsena - attended school in Beijing between 1963 and 1969
- Yu Zhengsheng, Chairman of the Chinese People's Political Consultative Conference - attended at the elementary level
- Deng Pufang, Vice Chairman of the Chinese People's Political Consultative Conference - attended at the elementary level
