= 1955 Laotian parliamentary election =

- 25 December 1955
- All 39 seats in Parliament; 20 seats needed for a majority
- Turnout: 75.62%
Party	Seats	+/–
National Progressive Party	22	+3
Independent Party	7	−3
Democratic Party	3	−1
Lao National Union Party	2	0
Independents	5	+1
This lists parties that won seats. See the complete results below.
Results by province
Prime Minister before	Prime Minister after
Katay Don Sasorith; NPP	Katay Don Sasorith; NPP

Parliamentary elections were held in Laos on 25 December 1955 to elect members of the National Assembly, the lower chamber of Parliament. The result was a victory for the ruling National Progressive Party, which won 22 of the 39 seats. Voter turnout was 76%.

== Results ==
Elections were only held in ten of the twelve provinces.

Party	Votes	%	Seats	+/–
National Progressive Party			22	+3
Independent Party			7	–3
Democratic Party			3	–1
Lao National Union Party			2	0
Independents			5	+1
Total			39	0
Total votes	227,841	–		
Registered voters/turnout	301,283	75.62		
Source: Nohlen et al.
