= 10th Inspection Commission of the Lao People's Revolutionary Party =

Lao People's Revolutionary Party (LPRP)

The 10th Inspection Commission of the Lao People's Revolutionary Party (LPRP) was elected at the 1st Plenary Session of the 10th LPRP Central Committee on 15 January 2021.

== Members ==
Rank	Name	Akson Lao	9th INS	11th INS	Gender
1	Bounthong Chitmany	ບຸນທອງ ຈິດມະນີ	Old	Not	Male
2	Sinay Mienglavanh	ສີໄນ ມຽງລາວັນ	Old	Reelected	Male
3	Khamsouane Changthavong	ຄໍາສວນ ຈັນທະວົງ	Old	Not	Male
4	Khamsouk Bounyavong	ຄໍາສຸກ ບຸນຍະວົງ	Old	Not	Male
5	Soukkhamphet Heuangbouthsy	ສຸກຄໍາເພັດ ເຮືອງບຸດສີ	?	Reelected	Male
6	Daoboualapha Bhavongphet	ດາວບົວລະພາ ບາວົງເພັດ	?	Reelected	Male
7	Xaykham Ounmyxay	ໄຊຄໍາ ອຸ່ນມີໄຊ	?	Reelected	Male
8	Vanxay Songsayou	ວັນໄຊ ຊົງຊາຢູ	?	Reelected	Male
9	Vilayvanh Boutdakham	ວິໄລວັນ ບຸດດາຄໍາ	?	Reelected	Male
