= Khemmani Pholsena =

- ເຂັມມະນີ ພົນເສນາ
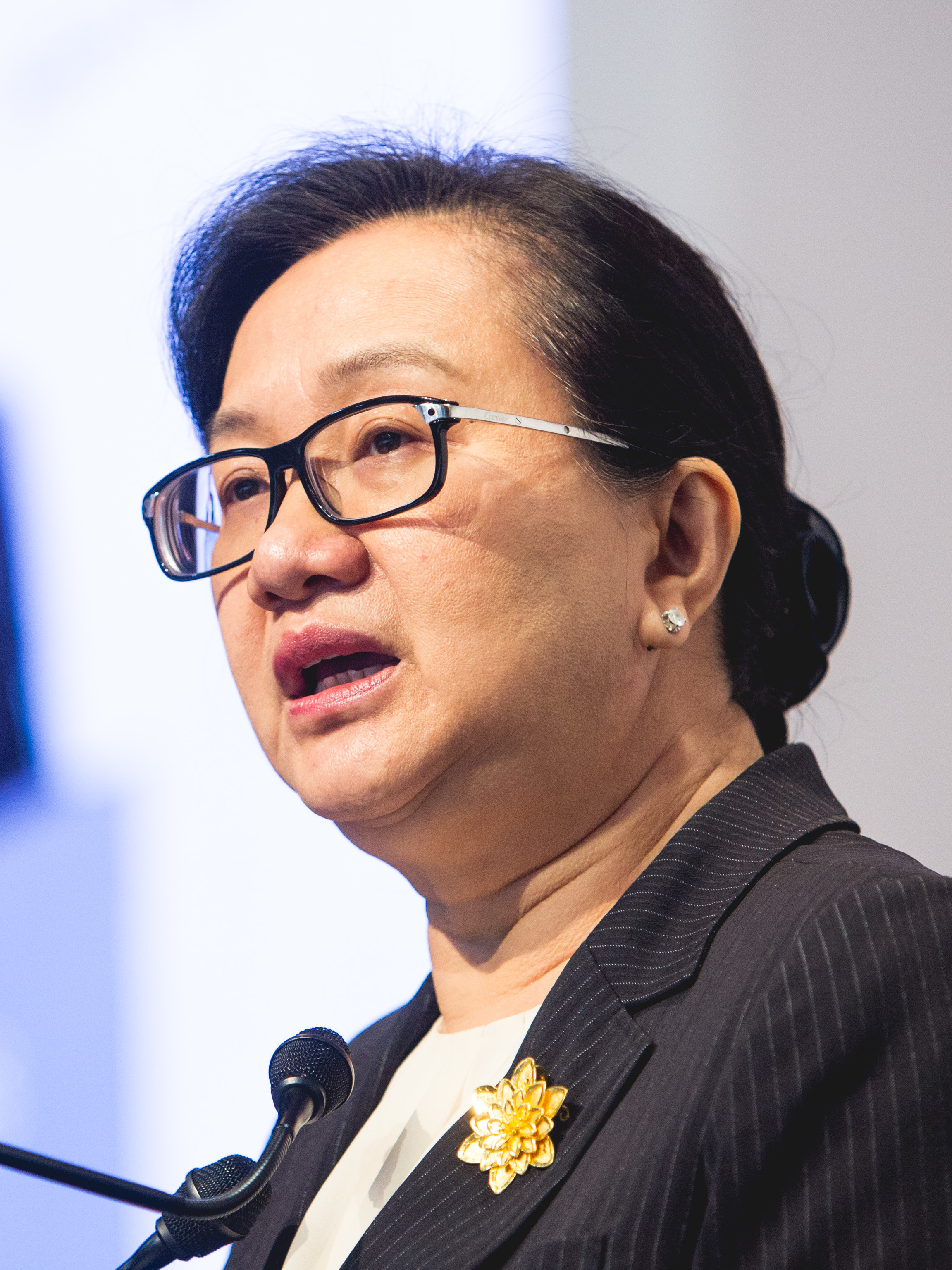
- Pholsena in 2017

Minister and Head of the President's Office

9th term
- Incumbent
- Assumed office 26 March 2021
- President: Thongloun Sisoulith
- Prime Minister: Phankham Viphavanh
- Preceded by: Khammeung Phongthady

Minister of Industry and Commerce

8th term
- In office 20 April 2016 – 22 March 2021
- Prime Minister: Thongloun Sisoulith
- Succeeded by: Khampheng Xaysompheng

7th term
- In office June 2014 – 20 April 2016
- Prime Minister: Thongsing Thammavong
- Preceded by: Nam Vignaket

Personal details
- Born: 1957/1958
- Party: Lao People's Revolutionary Party
- Education: Beijing Bayi School; Moscow State Institute of International Relations; National University of Singapore

Khemmani Pholsena (Lao: ເຂັມມະນີ ພົນເສນາ; born ?) is a Lao politician, Minister and Head of the President's Office and a member of the 11th Central Committee of the Lao People's Revolutionary Party (LPRP).

She is the fifth daughter of former Lao Minister of Foreign Affairs Quinim Pholsena. Together with her siblings, she studied at Beijing Bayi School between 1963 and 1969, where she was a schoolmate of current CCP General Secretary Xi Jinping. Between 1969 and 1975 she received her high school education in Vietnam. Between 1977 and 1982 Pholsena obtained her Bachelor and master's degrees in International Economic Relations from Moscow State Institute of International Relations. In 2003 she obtained a master's degree in Public Management from the National University of Singapore under the Lee Kuan Yew Fellowship.

She has served as Minister of Industry and Commerce, Vice Minister of Industry and Commerce and Director General of Foreign Trade Department at the same ministry. In March 2021 she was appointed as a top aide of Lao President Thongloun Sisoulith.

She was elected to the 10th term of the party Central Committee at the 10th LPRP National Congress in 2016, and to the 11th term at the 11th National Congress in 2021.
