= Phaya Khammao =

Phaya Khammao Vilay (Lao: ພະຍາ ຄຳມ້າວ ວິໄລ, 1892 – 1965) was a Lao politician. He was born in Luang Prabang, and was educated in France, and eventually in 1917 joined the French colonial administrator in Laos. He was appointed governor of Viang Chan from 1941 to 1945. He was one of the big contributors of funding Lao Issara in the cause of fighting for independence from France.

He headed the Lao Issara government formed in October 1945, serving under Phetsarath Ratanavongsa as Head of State, and followed the government into exile. Following the signing of Franco–Lao general convention in 1949, Khammao returned to French protectorate of Laos, and was appointed minister of justice and health in 1950.

In 1955, he was appointed the President of the Royal Council.

| Preceded by Phetsarath Ratanavongsa | Prime Minister of Laos; 1945–1946 | Succeeded by Kindavong |
