= 10th Central Committee of the Lao People's Revolutionary Party =

The 10th Central Committee of the Lao People's Revolutionary Party (LPRP) was elected at the 10th LPRP National Congress in 2016. It is composed of 69 members and 8 alternate members.

== Members ==
Rank	Name	Akson Lao	9th CC		11th CC		Gender
Rank	Name	Akson Lao	Change	Rank	Change	Rank	Gender
1	Bounnhang Vorachit	ບຸນຍັງ ວໍລະຈິດ	Old	3	Retired	—	Male
2	Thongloun Sisoulith	ທອງລຸນ ສີສຸລິດ	Old	6	Reelected	1	Male
3	Pany Yathotou	ນາງ ປານີ ຢາທໍ່ຕູ້	Old	4	Reelected	3	Female
4	Bounthong Chitmany	ບຸນທອງ ຈິດມະນີ	Old	9	Reelected	4	Male
5	Phankham Viphavanh	ພັນຄຳ ວິພາວັນ	Old	11	Reelected	2	Male
6	Chansy Phosikham	ຈັນສີ ໂພສີຄຳ	Old	13	Not	—	Male
7	Saysomphone Phomvihane	ໄຊສົມພອນ ພົມວິຫານ	Old	17	Reelected	5	Male
8	Chansamone Chanyalath	ຈັນສະໝອນ ຈັນຍາລາດ	Old	27	Reelected	6	Male
9	Khamphanh Phommathat	ຄໍາພັນ ພົມມະທັດ	Old	32	Reelected	7	Male
10	Sinlavong Khoutphaythoune	ສິນລະວົງ ຄຸດໄພທູນ	Old	31	Reelected	8	Male
11	Sonexay Siphandone	ສອນໄຊ ສີພັນດອນ	Old	34	Reelected	9	Male
12	Sengnouan Xayalath	ແສງນວນ ໄຊຍະລາດ	Old	15	Retired	—	Male
13	Kikeo Khaykhamphithoune	ກິແກ້ວ ໄຂຄໍາພິທູນ	Old	39	Reelected	10	Male
14	Somkeo Silavong	ສົມແກ້ວ ສີລາວົງ	Old	53	Not	—	Male
15	Vilay Lakhamfong	ວິໄລ ຫລ້າຄໍາຟອງ	New	—	Reelected	11	Male
16	Bounpone Bouttanavong	ບຸນປອນ ບຸດຕະນະວົງ	Old	10	Retired	—	Male
17	Somphanh Phengkhammy	ສົມພັນ ແພງຄຳມີ	Old	18	Retired	—	Male
18	Khammanh Sounvileuth	ຄຳໝັ້ນ ສູນວິເລີດ	Old	21	Retired	—	Male
19	Chaleun Yiapaoher	ຈະເລີນ ເຢຍປາວເຮີ	Old	22	Reelected	19	Male
20	Khamsane Souvong	ຄຳສານ ສຸວົງ	Old	30	Not	—	Male
21	Somkot Mangnomek	ສົມກົດ ມັງໜໍ່ເມກ	Old	33	Not	—	Male
22	Nam Viyaketh	ນາມ ວິຍະເກດ	Old	35	Retired	—	Male
23	Sisay Leudetmounsone	ສີໃສ ລືເດດມູນສອນ	Old	37	Reelected	12	Female
24	Khambay Damlath	ຄຳໃບ ດຳລັດ	Old	40	Reelected	20	Male
25	Sommad Pholsena	ສົມມາດ ພົນເສນາ	Old	41	Reelected	21	Male
26	Somdy Duangdy	ສົມດີ ດວງດີ	Old	42	Not	—	Male
27	Bosengkham Vongdara	ບໍ່ແສງຄໍາ ວົງດາລາ	Old	44	Not	—	Male
28	Lien Thikeo	ລຽນ ທິແກ້ວ	Old	45	Not	—	Male
29	Eksavang Vongvichit	ເອກສະຫວ່າງ ວົງວິຈິດ	Old	46	Not	—	Male
30	Xaysi Santivong	ໄຊສີ ສັນຕິວົງ	Old	48	Not	—	Male
31	Khampheng Saysompheng	ຄຳແພງ ໄຊສົມແພງ	Old	49	Reelected	22	Male
32	Souvone Leuangbounmy	ສຸວອນ ເລືອງບຸນມີ	Old	51	Reelected	23	Male
33	Khammeung Phongthady	ຄຳເມິງ ພົງທະດີ	Old	52	Not	—	Male
34	Khamjane Vongphosy	ຄຳເຈນ ວົງໂພສີ	Old	54	Reelected	24	Male
35	Pan Noymany	ປ້ານ ນ້ອຍມະນີ	Old	55	Not	—	Male
36	Soukkongseng Saignaleuth	ສຸກກົງແສງ ໄຊຍະເລີດ	Old	56	Not	—	Male
37	Khamphanh Sitthidampha	ຄຳພັນ ສິດທິດຳພາ	Old	57	Reelected	25	Male
38	Khampheuy Bouddavieng	ຄຳເຜີຍ ບຸດດາວຽງ	Old	59	Reelected	26	Male
39	Sounthone Xayachack	ສູນທອນ ໄຊຍະຈັກ	Old	60	Reelected	17	Female
40	Thongloy Silivong	ທອງລອຍ ສິລິວົງ	Old	61	Reelected	27	Male
41	Khammany Inthirath	ຄຳມະນີ ອິນທິລາດ	New	—	Not	—	Male
42	Oday Soudaphone	ໂອໄດ ສຸດາພອນ	New	—	Not	—	Male
43	Kongkeo Xaysongkham	ກອງແກ້ວ ໄຊສົງຄາມ	New	—	Reelected	28	Male
44	Inlavanh Keobounphanh	ອິນລາວັນ ແກ້ວບຸນພັນ	New	—	Reelected	29	Female
45	Khamkhan Chanthavisouk	ຄຳຂັນ ຈັນທະວີສຸກ	New	—	Reelected	30	Male
46	Khemmani Pholsena	ເຂັມມະນີ ພົນເສນາ	New	—	Reelected	31	Female
47	Boviengkham Vongdara	ບໍ່ວຽງຄໍາ ວົງດາລາ	New	—	Reelected	32	Male
48	Viengthong Siphandone	ວຽງທອງ ສີພັນດອນ	New	—	Reelected	18	Female
49	Sonethanou Thammavong	ສອນທະນູ ທຳມະວົງ	New	—	Reelected	33	Male
50	Saleumxay Kommasith	ສະເຫລີມໄຊ ກົມມະສິດ	New	—	Reelected	13	Male
51	Sengdeuane Lachanthaboun	ແສງເດືອນ ຫລ້າຈັນທະບູນ	New	—	Not	—	Female
52	Vilayvong Bouddakham	ວິໄລວົງ ບຸດດາຄຳ	New	—	Reelected	34	Male
53	Somphao Phaysith	ສົມພາວ ໄຟສິດ	New	—	Not	—	Male
54	Thansamay Kommasith	ທັນສະໄໝ ກົມມະສິດ	New	—	Not	—	Male
55	Thongsalith Mangnomek	ທອງສະຫລິດ ມັງໜໍ່ເມກ	New	—	Reelected	16	Male
56	Bounchanh Sinthavong	ບຸນຈັນ ສິນທະວົງ	New	—	Not	—	Male
57	Sisouvanh Vongchomsy	ສີສຸວັນ ວົງຈອມສີ	New	—	Not	—	Male
58	Phet Phomphiphak	ເພັດ ພົມພິພັກ	New	—	Reelected	35	Male
59	Phongsavanh Sitthavong	ພົງສະຫວັນ ສິດທະວົງ	New	—	Reelected	36	Male
60	Khamphanh Pheuyavong	ຄຳພັນ ເຜີຍຍະວົງ	New	—	Reelected	14	Male
61	Phetsakhone Luang-aphay	ເພັດສາຄອນ ຫລວງອາໄພ	New	—	Not	—	Male
62	Vidong Sayasone	ວິດົງ ໄຊຍະສອນ	New	—	Not	—	Male
63	Anouphab Tounalom	ອະນຸພາບ ຕຸນາລົມ	New	—	Reelected	15	Male
64	Sinthavong Xayakone	ສິນທະວົງ ໄຊຍະກອນ	New	—	Not	—	Male
65	Bounthong Divixay	ບຸນຖອງ ດີວິໄຊ	New	—	Not	—	Male
66	Souphanh Keomixay	ສຸພັນ ແກ້ວມີໄຊ	New	—	Not	—	Male
67	Vanxay Phengxoumma	ວັນໄຊ ແພງຊຸມມາ	New	—	Reelected	37	Male
68	Phetthavone Philavanh	ເພັດຖາວອນ ພິລາວັນ	New	—	Not	—	Male
69	Santiphab Phomvihane	ສັນຕິພາບ ພົມວິຫານ	New	—	Reelected	38	Male

=== Alternates ===
Rank	Name	Akson Lao	11th CC		Gender
Rank	Name	Akson Lao	Change	Rank	Gender
1	Bounkham Vorachit	ບຸນຄໍາ ວໍລະຈິດ	Member	39	Female
2	Buakhong Nammavong	ບົວຄົງ ນາມມະວົງ	Member	40	Male
3	Sonexay Sitphaxay	ສອນໄຊ ສິດພະໄຊ	Member	41	Male
4	Baykham Khattiya	ໃບຄໍາ ຂັດຕິຍະ	Member	42	Female
5	Alounxay Sounnalath	ອາລຸນໄຊ ສູນນະລາດ	Member	43	Male
6	Suanesavanh Vignaket	ສວນສະຫວັນ ວິຍະເກດ	Member	44	Female
7	Phoxay Sayasone	ໂພໄຊ ໄຊຍະສອນ	Member	45	Male
8	Laopaoxong Navongxay	ລາວປາວຊົງ ນະວົງໄຊ	Member	46	Male
