= Peace and Neutrality Party =

Defunct political party in Laos

Peace and Neutrality Party ສັນຕິພາບເປັນກາງ
- Abbreviation: SPK
- President: Quinim Pholsena
- Founded: 1956
- Split from: National Progressive Party

The Peace and Neutrality Party (Lao: ສັນຕິພາບເປັນກາງ, romanized: Santiphab Pen Kang) was a political party in Laos.

== History ==
The party was established by Quinim Pholsena in 1956 after he was expelled from the National Progressive Party. In the supplementary elections in 1958 it won four seats after campaigning alongside the Lao Patriotic Front.

The electoral law was amended prior to the 1960 elections, introducing a requirement for candidates to have a degree. This disqualified most of the party's leadership and it failed to win a seat.
