= Democratic Party (Laos) =

Defunct political party in Laos

Democratic Party ພັກປະຊາທິປະໄຕ
- Leader: Kou Voravong
- Founded: 1948
- Split from: Lao National Union Party
- Newspaper: Sieng Lao

The Democratic Party was a political party in Laos.

== History ==
The party was established in 1948 by Kou Voravong, and was controlled by the Voravong family, who also paid for the party's newspaper Sieng Lao (Voice of Laos) to be published. It won four of the 39 seats in the 1951 elections. Following Kou Voravong's assassination in 1954, it was reduced to three seats in the 1955 elections. However, the cabinet was constitutionally required to obtain the support of two-thirds of MPs, and therefore the party held a significant amount of power over the National Progressive Party, which had won 22 seats. It failed to win a seat in the 1958 supplementary elections.
