= Constitution of the Kingdom of Laos =

Constituent Assembly
- Citation: Revised constitution of the Kingdom of Laos (30 August 1957)
- Enacted by: Constituent Assembly
- Enacted: 28 April 1947
- Assented to: 11 May 1947
- Commenced: 11 May 1947
- Introduced by: Constituent Assembly
- Status: Repealed

The Constitution of the Kingdom of Laos was the supreme law of the Kingdom of Laos (1947-1975). It was composed of seven sections and 44 articles.

The text of the written constitution was one of the legally binding sources of constitutional law in the Kingdom. The Constitution defined Laos as "a unitary, indivisible and democratic kingdom", defined the Lao language the language of the state, and made Buddhism the state religion. It also specified the role of the King of Laos, the Council of Ministers (the government) and the role of the National Assembly. Due to the French influence over the country during its development, the constitution and government were arranged along French lines.

== History ==
The first written constitution was developed in Laos following the Japanese surrender in the Second World War in April 1945, when the country became independent of both Japan and France, its previous coloniser. Prime Minister Phetsarath Ratanavongsa called a People's Assembly to produce a provisional interim constitution specifying a constitutional monarchy; however, his government fled to Thailand upon the return of the French later that month.

Following the return of the French to Laos, it was decided that a constitutional monarchy would be necessary for stability and to become part of the French Union. Elections were held in 1946 under universal male suffrage for the Constituent Assembly of the Kingdom of Laos, which formulated and enacted the Constitution. It took effect on 11 May 1947.

The Constitution was amended twice: first on 29 September 1956 and again on 30 July 1961. It remained in force until 2 December 1975, when the Lao People's Revolutionary Party seized power and abolished the Kingdom of Laos.
