= Independent Party (Laos) =

Former political party in Laos

Independent Party ພັກເສຣີ
- Leader: Phoui Sananikone
- Founder: Phoui Sananikone
- Founded: 1945
- Dissolved: June 1958
- Merged into: Lao People's Rally
- Ideology: Anti-communism; Capitalism; Social progressivism Pro-western bloc

The Independent Party (Lao: ພັກເສຣີ, romanized: Phak Seri) was a political party in Laos.

== History ==
The party was established by members of Lao Issara in 1945. Led by Phoui Sananikone, the party was involved in post-war governments, with Phoui appointed Minister of Health, Education and Welfare in 1947, and served as prime minister in 1950 and 1951. The party won ten seats in the 1951 parliamentary elections, but was reduced to seven seats in the 1955 elections.

Prior to the 1958 supplementary elections the party held talks with the National Progressive Party about an electoral pact in order to counter the Lao Patriotic Front. However, the parties failed to agree on a joint list and split their vote, resulting in the Patriotic Front winning the most seats. The two merged later in the year to form the Lao People's Rally.
