= 11th Inspection Commission of the Lao People's Revolutionary Party =

The 11th Inspection Commission of the Lao People's Revolutionary Party (LPRP) was elected at the 1st Plenary Session of the 11th LPRP Central Committee on 15 January 2021.

== Members ==
Rank	Name	Akson Lao	10th INS	Gender
1	Khamphan Phommathat	ຄໍາພັນ ພົມມະທັດ	New	Male
2	Vilayvanh Boutdakham	ວິໄລວັນ ບຸດດາຄໍາ	Old	Male
3	Sinay Mienglavanh	ສີໄນ ມຽງລາວັນ	Old	Male
4	Soukkhamphet Heuangbouthsy	ສຸກຄໍາເພັດ ເຮືອງບຸດສີ	Old	Male
5	Daoboualapha Bhavongphet	ດາວບົວລະພາ ບາວົງເພັດ	Old	Male
6	Xaykham Ounmyxay	ໄຊຄໍາ ອຸ່ນມີໄຊ	Old	Male
7	Vanxay Songsayou	ວັນໄຊ ຊົງຊາຢູ	Old	Male
