= Eksavang Vongvichit =

Laotian politician

Vongvichit in 2017

Eksavang Vongvichit (Lao: ເອກສະຫວ່າງ ວົງວິຈິດ) is a Laotian politician who served as Minister for Public Health.
