= 1960 Laotian parliamentary election =

Parliamentary elections were held in Laos on 24 April 1960 to elect members of the National Assembly, the lower chamber of Parliament. The result was a victory for the Committee for the Defence of the National Interests, which won 34 of the 59 seats.

== Results ==
Party	Seats	+/–
Committee for the Defence of National Interests	34	New
Lao People's Rally	17	–16
Lao Patriotic Front	0	–9
Peace and Neutrality Party	0	–4
Independents	8	+4
Total	59	–1
Source: Nohlen et al.
