= List of administrators of the French protectorate of Laos =

This article lists the administrators of the French protectorate of Laos, and also encompass the Japanese occupation of Laos.

(Dates in italics indicate de facto continuation of office)

Tenure	Portrait	Incumbent	Notes
French suzerainty
1887 to 5 June 1894		Auguste Jean Marie Pavie, Vice-Consul	
5 June 1894 to April 1895		Auguste Jean Marie Pavie, Commissioner-General	
1 June 1895 to 30 April 1899		Marie Auguste Armand Tournier, Commandant-Superior of Bas-Laos	In Khong, Champasak
1 June 1895 to 9 March 1897		Joseph Vacle, Interim Commandant-Superior of Haut-Laos	1st time, in Luang Prabang
1 May 1897 to 11 October 1898		Louis Paul Luce, Interim Commandant-Superior of Haut-Laos	In Luang Prabang
11 October 1898 to April 1899		Joseph Vacle, Interim Commandant-Superior of Haut-Laos	2nd time, in Luang Prabang
September 1895 to March 1896		Léon Jules Pol Boulloche, Resident-Superior	
30 April 1899 to February 1903		Marie Auguste Armand Tournier, Resident-Superior	
12 February 1903 to May 1906		Georges Marie Joseph Mahé, Interim Resident-Superior	1st time
11 May 1906 to 1 April 1907		Louis Saturnin Laffont, Interim Resident-Superior	
1 April 1907 to January 1912		Georges Marie Joseph Mahé, Resident-Superior	2nd time
24 August 1910 to 27 July 1911		Antoine Georges Amédeé Ernest Outrey, Acting Resident-Superior	Acting for Mahé
9 January 1912 to July 1913		Louis Antoine Aubry de la Noë, Interim Resident-Superior	
4 July 1913 to October 1913		Claude Léon Garnier, Acting Resident-Superior	1st time
9 October 1913 to February 1914		Jean Édouard Bourcier Saint-Chaffray, Interim Resident-Superior	
31 May 1914 to May 1918		Claude Léon Garnier, Acting Resident-Superior	2nd time
3 May 1918 to March 1931		Jules Georges Théodore Bosc, Resident-Superior	
26 April 1921 to January 1923		Joël Daroussin, Interim Resident-Superior	Acting for Bosc
7 May 1925 to January 1926		Jean-Jacques Dauplay, Interim Resident-Superior	Acting for Bosc
21 May 1928 to 12 December 1928		Paul Raimond Octane Le Boulanger, Interim Resident-Superior	Acting for Bosc
21 March 1931 to 12 May 1931		Paul Raimond Octane Le Boulanger, Interim Resident-Superior	1st time
25 March 1931		Pierre André Michel Pagès, Resident-Superior	Did not take office
21 May 1931 to 4 June 1931		Yves Charles Châtel, Resident-Superior	
11 June 1931 to 21 November 1931		Paul Raimond Octane Le Boulanger, Interim Resident-Superior	2nd time
21 November 1931 to 11 February 1932		Jules Nicolas Thiebaut, Interim Resident-Superior	
11 February 1932 to 16 December 1933		Aristide Eugène Le Fol, Resident-Superior	
16 December 1933 to 1 January 1934		Adrien Anthony Maurice Roques, Acting Resident-Superior	1st time
1 January 1934 to July 1934		Louis Frédéric Eckert, Interim Resident-Superior	
10 July 1934 to 4 August 1934		Adrien Anthony Maurice Roques, Acting Resident-Superior	2nd time
4 August 1934 to April 1938		Eugène Henri Roger Eutrope, Resident-Superior	
25 November 1934 to 13 October 1935		Frédéric Claire Guillaume Louis Marty, Interim Resident-Superior	
5 April 1938 to 16 November 1940		André Touzet, Resident-Superior	
16 November 1940 to 29 December 1941		Adrien Anthony Maurice Roques, Interim Resident-Superior	3rd time
29 December 1941 to August 1945		Louis Antoine Marie Brasey, Resident-Superior	Japanese prisoner 10 March 1945 – 9 June 1945
Japanese suzerainty
10 March 1945 to August 1945		Sako Masanori, Commander	In Vientiane
5 April 1945 to 22 August 1945		Ishibashi, Supreme Counselor	In Luang Prabang
French suzerainty
29 August 1945 to 6 April 1946		Hans Imfeld, Commissioner	Acting to 23 September 1945
6 April 1946 to July 1947		Jean Léon François Marie de Raymond, Commissioner	
29 July 1947 to 20 March 1948		Maurice Marie Auguste Michaudel, Interim Commissioner	
20 March 1948 to August 1949		Alfred Gabriel Joseph Valmary, Interim Commissioner	
8 August 1949 to April 1953		Robert Louis Aimable Régnier, Commissioner	
27 April 1953 to January 1954		Miguel Joaquim de Pereyra, High Commissioner	
6 January 1954 to 1955		Michel Georges Eugène Breal, High Commissioner	

== See also ==
- History of Laos
- French Protectorate of Laos
- French colonial empire
