= Lao Issara =

Laotian anti-French movement (1945–1949)

Kingdom of Laos ພຣະຣາຊອານາຈັກລາວ (Lao) Phrarasa Anachak Lao
- 1945–1946; 1946–1949: Government-in-exile
- Flag
- Anthem: ເພງຊາດລາວ; Pheng Xat Lao "Hymn of the Lao People"
- Capital: Vientiane (official), Luang Prabang (ceremonial)
- Capital-in-exile: Bangkok
- Common languages: Lao (official), French
- Religion: Theravada Buddhism
- Government: Provisional government (1945–1946), Government-in-exile (1946–1949)
- Head of State
  - 1945–1946: Prince Phetsarath
- Prime Minister
  - 1945–1946: Phaya Khammao
- Historical era: World War II
  - Independence declared: 8 April 1945
  - Lao Issara takeover: 12 October 1945
  - French restoration: 24 April 1946
  - Disestablished: 24 October 1949
- Currency: Lao kip
Preceded by	Succeeded by
Kingdom of Laos (Japanese puppet)	French protectorate of Laos
- Today part of: Laos

The Lao Issara (Lao: ລາວອິສຣະ lit. 'Free Laos') was an anti-French nationalist movement formed on 12 October 1945 by Prince Phetsarath Ratanavongsa. The short-lived movement emerged after the Japanese defeat in World War II and became the government of Laos before the return of the French. It aimed to prevent the French from restoring their control over Laos. The group disbanded in 1949.

== Japanese puppet state and French resumption of power ==
In 1944, France was liberated, and General Charles de Gaulle was brought into power. At the same time, Japanese Empire troops were being largely defeated in the Pacific Front and in a last-minute attempt of trying to draw support, Japan dissolved French control over its Indochinese colonies in March 1945. Large numbers of French officials in Laos were then imprisoned by the Japanese. King Sisavang Vong was also imprisoned and was forced by the Japanese, and with the urging of Prime Minister Prince Phetsarath, into declaring his Kingdom of Luang Phrabang within the French Protectorate of Laos as an independent state while accepting it into the Greater East Asia Co-Prosperity Sphere on 8 April 1945.

Prince Phetsarath remained as Prime Minister in the newly-independent nation. At the same time, remaining French officials and civilians withdrew to the mountains to regroup and join a growing Laotian insurgency against the Japanese, who occupied Vientiane in March 1945. Led by Crown Prince Savang Vatthana, Laotian insurgents challenged Japanese forces by carrying out attacks on Japanese officials and troops in Laos and many Lao died fighting with the French resistance against the Japanese occupiers.

After Japan's surrender in August, King Sisavang Vong agreed with the French that he intended to have Laos resume its former status as a French colony against the urging of Prince Phetsarath, who sent a telegram to all Laotian provincial governors notifying them that the Japanese surrender did not affect Laos' status as independent and warning them to resist any foreign intervention. Phetsarath also proclaimed unification with the country and the southern Lao provinces of Indochina on 15 September, which led to the King dismissing him from his post as prime minister on 10 October.

Prince Phetsarath and several other Lao nationalists formed Lao Issara in the power vacuum, which took control of the government and reaffirmed the country's independence on 12 October 1945.

Lao Issara cabinet ministers
Position	Name
Head of State	Phetsarath Ratanavongsa
Prime Minister/Minister of Foreign Affairs	Phaya Khammao
Minister of Public Works	Souvanna Phouma
Minister of Defense and Communication	Souphanouvong
Minister of Interior and Justice	Somsanith Vongkotrattana
Minister of Finance	Katay Don Sasorith
Minister of Education	Nhouy Abhay
Minister of Economic Affairs	Oune Sananikone
Minister of Justice	Ouneheuane Norasing
Vice-Minister of Defense	Sing Ratanasamay
Vice-Minister of Economic Affairs	Keuang Pathoumsath
Vice-Minister of Foreign Affairs	Tham Saygnasithsena

== Weaknesses of government ==
For six months, the Lao Issara government attempted to exercise its authority by establishing a defense force under the command of Phetsarath's younger half-brother Souphanouvong, with the assistance from the Viet Minh government of Ho Chi Minh and the Chinese forces.

However, two events opened the way for the French reconquest of Laos: the modus vivendi agreed between Ho Chi Minh and the French government on 6 March 1946, and the agreement of withdrawal of Chinese forces. This left the Lao Issara government alone to fend for itself, and it became militarily weaker in comparison to the French.

Besides the inability to receive foreign aid, the Lao Issara was also crippled by other internal weaknesses.

The Lao Issara was a small urban-based movement and was therefore unable to gain mass support from a tribal-oriented population. Its ideas of an independent Laos failed to appeal to the masses.

"As for the population, it was mostly silent, used to the established order and did not appear hardly concerned by this aspiration for the country's independence, and personally I think that it was mostly loyal to the ancienne administration, that is to say, the French." - Houmphanh Saignasith, the Secretary to the Minister of Economy

The Lao Issara also did not manage the finances of the country appropriately. The army itself incurred a high cost for its maintenance, and Souphanouvong refused to account for it. Within a very short period of time, the Issara government ran out of money to pay for its own running, let alone anything else. In an attempt to reign in fiscal expenditure and inflation, the Minister of Finance, Katay Don Sasorith, issued new money in early 1946, which quickly became known as "Katay's dried banana leaves" for the poor quality of the paper on which it was printed and its uselessness. The Lao Issara, bankrupt and ill-equipped, could only await the inevitable French return. At the end of April 1946, the French took Vientiane, and by May, they had entered Luang Prabang, and the Lao Issara leadership fled into exile in Thailand.

== Split ==
Once the reconquest was complete, the French set about reconstituting their administration in Laos. On 27 August 1946, the French formally endorsed the unity of the Kingdom of Laos as a constitutional monarchy within the French Union.

There were also French efforts made at conciliation with the nationalists. Discreet overtures toward the Lao Issara in Bangkok suggested the possibility of an amnesty. Gradually, a division of opinion appeared within the Lao Issara ranks over the practical issue of whether to co-operate with the French.

Souphanouvong had made clear his refusal to accept the new political setup in Vientiane, and was ready to embrace an alliance with the Viet Minh against the French. That repelled most of his colleagues, who began to oppose Souphanouvong's leadership in the Lao Issara.

Also, unhappiness towards Souphanouvong became obvious because of his refusal to be accountable to the Issara government for his military activities and financial expenditure. There were personal antagonisms between Souphanouvong and Katay. Both exchanged harsh criticisms at each other since both thought the other to be ineffective in their positions.

A lack of co-operation within the movement led to the Lao Issara to announce its formal dissolution on 14 October 1949. On 22 October 1953, the Franco–Lao Treaty of Amity and Association transferred remaining French powers, except control of military affairs, to the Royal Lao Government, which did not include any representatives from the disbanded Lao Issara.

== Legacy ==
A flag resembling that of Thailand, initially used by Lao Issara and then by the Pathet Lao, was formally adopted on 2 December 1975, as the flag of Laos.

== See also ==
- French colonial administration of Laos
- Khmer Issarak
- Ong Keo
- Ong Kommandam
- Seri Thai
