= Lao People's Rally =

Defunct political party in Laos

Lao People's Rally ພລາວລວມລາວ
- Leader: Souvanna Phouma (last)
- Founded: June 1958
- Merger of: National Progressive Party; Independent Party

The Lao People's Rally (Lao: ລາວລວມລາວ Lao Ruam Lao) was a political party in Laos.

== History ==
The party was established in June 1958 as a merger of the National Progressive Party and the Independent Party following their defeat in the 1958 supplementary elections. The new party held 36 seats and one of its leaders, Phoui Sananikone, became Prime Minister in August 1958. However, it was reduced to 17 seats in the 1960 elections. Following the elections Souvanna Phouma became the party's leader, although by then it was effectively defunct.
