= National Progressive Party (Laos) =

Political party in Laos

National Progressive Party ພັກຊາດກ້າວຫນ້າ
- Leader: Souvanna Phouma
- Founder: Xieng Mao; Souvanna Phouma; Katay Don Sasorith
- Founded: 1950
- Dissolved: 1958
- Merged into: Lao People's Rally

National Progressive Party (Lao: ພັກຊາດກ້າວຫນ້າ, romanized: Phak Xat Kao Na) was a political party in Laos in the 1950s. The party was founded in 1950 by former Lao Issara members Xieng Mao, Souvanna Phouma, and Katay Don Sasorith.

In the August 1951 elections for the National Assembly of Laos, the party won 19 of 39 seats, which was considered a landslide victory; in 1955, won with 23 of 39 seats. The party's leader, Souvanna Phouma, became prime minister.

Following the 1958 election, the party dissolved when it merged with the Independent Party into the Lao People's Rally.

== Election history ==
Elections to the National Assembly of Laos
Election	First-preference votes	FPv%	Seats	Government
1951	unknown	N/A	19 / 39	Government
1955	unknown	N/A	22 / 39	Government
1958	unknown	N/A	26 / 60	Government following a merger with the Independent Party
