= Committee for the Defence of National Interests =

Committee for the Defence of National Interests Comité pour la défense des intérêts nationaux
- Founder: Phoumi Nosavan
- Founded: 10 June 1958
- Dissolved: 1960
- Ideology: Conservatism; Reformism; Nationalism; Anti-communism; Militarism; Authoritarianism; Anti-corruption; Authoritarian direct democracy Pro-western bloc
- Political position: Right-wing
- Religion: Buddhism

The Committee for the Defence of National Interests (original name in French: Comité pour la défense des intérêts nationaux; abbreviated CDNI or CDIN) was an anti-communist right-wing political party founded in the Kingdom of Laos on 10 June 1958. Dismayed by the election of Lao communists to the National Assembly in the May 1958 elections, younger politicians and military officers founded CDNI as an alternative to older Lao politicians and senior officers then in power. The CDNI pronounced itself as a force for anti-corruption efforts in the Royal Lao Government. It was backed by the United States embassy; American support was manifested in political advice and civic actions such as Operation Booster Shot. In the 24 April 1960 elections, which were obviously rigged, the CDNI won 32 of 59 seats. The Pathet Lao leadership had been detained during the election; on 23 May 1960, they escaped to join their insurrection in the mountains. This ended the governing coalition, and fighting began in the Laotian Civil War.

== Background ==
During the First Indochina War, on 23 December 1950, the United States government began providing military support to the French in French Protectorate of Laos in a war against local forces fighting for Laotian independence. The 1954 Geneva Conference ended the war and established a free Kingdom of Laos. Following Laotian independence, the United States continued support for the French-supported Royal Lao Government and the Royal Lao Army. In 1955, the US established both an aid program and a military mission. It also supplied political expertise to Lao right-wing politicians through such propaganda efforts as Operation Booster Shot, run by the Central Intelligence Agency and the US Air Force. The U.S. objective was prevention of a democratic communist takeover of a coalition government.

== History ==
In May 1958, the Kingdom of Laos held national elections. At stake were 21 seats being added to the National Assembly. Despite extensive American aid to rightist candidates, Pathet Lao communist candidates won nine seats; a party allied to them won another four. In reaction to the leftist victories, young conservative Lao politicians and military officers, as evidenced by their group's nickname of les Jeunes (the youngsters), formed the Comite pour la Defense des Interets Nationaux (Committee for the Defense of National Interests, or CDNI) on 10 June 1958. Many of them had been educated abroad, and traveled to other Asian nations, France, and the United States. They had returned to a society corruptly dominated economically and politically by a few families. The new party announced itself opposed to corruption. As a member stated, "... certain families continued to divide titles and prerogatives among themselves ..." and "... ministerial posts cloaked the most disgraceful trafficking or were traded about like currency." On 23 July 1958, the new CDNI managed a vote of "no confidence" on Souvanna Phouma, relegating him to a subsequent exile as Ambassador to France. Having deposed a prime minister, the CDNI reaped the benefits under his replacement, Phoui Sananikone. Four seats in the new 18 August 1958 Cabinet were filled by CDNI members, including Minister of Justice and Minister of Foreign Affairs. There were no Pathet Lao in the Cabinet. The Committee's staunch anti-communism attracted confused American support. While Ambassador Horace H. Smith favored Phoui Sananikone, the military and the Central Intelligence Agency's paramilitary staff favored the CDNI. The subsequent rightward turn in Royal Lao Government policies caused by the CDNI alienated the Pathet Lao.

Among the young Royal Lao Army officers belonging to the CDNI were Oudone Sananikone and Colonel Phoumi Nosavan. The latter would become the Minister of Defense. Although he had accommodated them, Phoui Sananilone disliked having the "Young Turks" of the CDNI usurp his administration; he considered them an illegal political party. With the CDNI holding five seats in the Cabinet, supported by their junior members in the government bureaucracy, and with U.S. backing, by January 1959 they took over the government. On 14 January, the CDNI did appoint him to a year's plenary powers for 1959; however, they replaced his allies in the cabinet, replacing them with military officers from CDNI and reducing him to a figurehead.

In May 1959, Phoui was pressured by his CDNI ministers to integrate Pathet Lao troops into the Royal Lao Army. These attempts at building a coalition failed, with one battalion escaping confinement to continue their campaigning. Skirmishing broke out on the Plain of Jars during July. The Pathet Lao had been peacefully negotiating with the Royal Lao Government since November 1947; now it resorted to arms. Beginning on 30 August 1959, Pathet Lao troops aided by Viet Minh fought with RLA troops in their posts along the border with North Vietnam. Press reports worldwide exaggerated the extent of the fighting and sensationalized Vietnamese involvement. There seemed little recognition of the disparity in forces; 500 Pathet Lao were opposed by an army of about 20,000 Lao regulars. The CDNI-run RLG appealed to the United Nations for help. On 7 September, as the U.N. Security Council opened proceedings on Laos, Phoui declared martial law. A UN investigative subcommittee arrived in Laos on 15 September. A scheduled conference of SEATO military advisers began 20 September. While the Asian members of SEATO were in favor of intervention, the non-Asian members were content to wait and monitor the situation. The 5 November report by the U.N. subcommittee found no external backing for the Pathet Lao. It was during this process that it became apparent that the United States, despite its rhetoric, was in a poor position to overcome geographic difficulties and intervene in Laos to back the CDNI.

Taking note of the fact that the National Assembly's term in office ended 25 December 1959, in early December Phoui extended its term until scheduled elections in April 1960. In return, CDNI adherent Phoumi Nosavan seized the nation on 25 December 1959 and deposed Phoui. Phoumi believed that once he was elected, he could impose an authoritarian "directed democracy" upon an ignorant populace for their own good. Meanwhile, Kou Abhay succeeded to a caretaker Prime Ministership on 7 January 1960. When the elections took place as scheduled, on 24 April 1960, they were easily perceived as fraudulent; one communist candidate lost by 18,189 to 4, another by 6,508. CDNI candidates were awarded 32 of the 59 seats at stake. A month later, on 23 May 1960, the Pathet Lao leadership—including Prince Souphanouvong—escaped imprisonment to join their troops in the hills.

The Laotian Civil War flared up again.
