= Nam Viyaketh =

Laotian politician

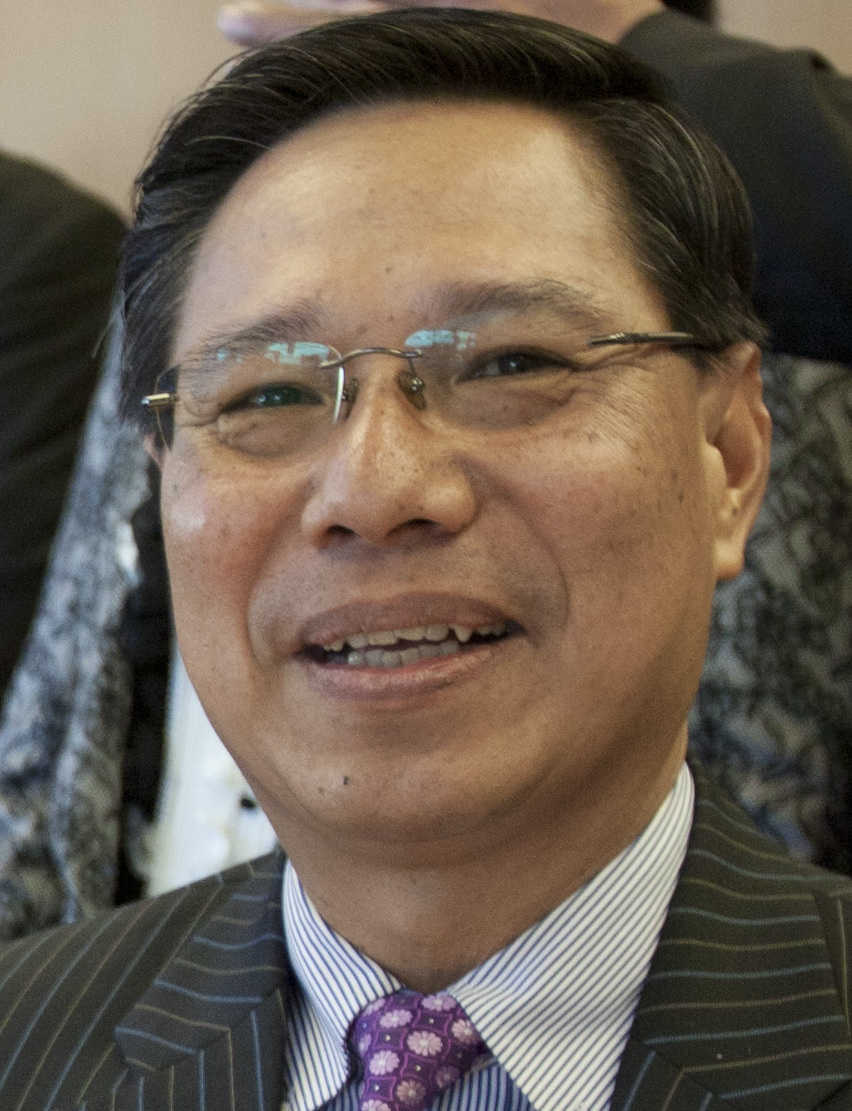
Nam Viyaket in 2012

Nam Viyaketh (Lao: ນາມ ວິຍະເກດ; born 5 June 1958) is a Laotian statesman and member of the Lao People's Revolutionary Party. As of 2010, he was Minister of Industry and Commerce of Laos.

He is the son of Samane Vignaket.
