= Phetsarath Ratanavongsa =

Laotian prime minister and prince

Phetsarath Ratanavongsa Uparaja
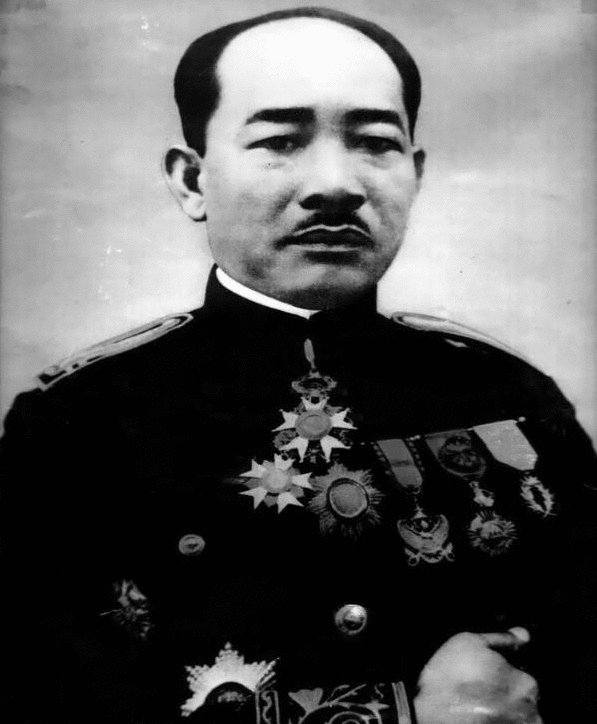
- Phetsarath c. 1940s

Head of State of Laos
- In office 12 October 1945 – 24 April 1946
- Preceded by: Sisavang Vong
- Succeeded by: Sisavang Vong

Prime Minister of Luang Phrabang
- In office 21 August 1941 – 10 October 1945
- Monarch: Sisavang Vong
- Preceded by: Office created
- Succeeded by: Phaya Khammao

Personal details
- Born: 19 January 1890 Luang Prabang, Kingdom of Luang Phrabang, Siam
- Died: 14 October 1959 (aged 69) Luang Prabang; Laos
- Party: Lao Issara (1945-1949)
- Spouse(s): Nhin Kham Venne; Apinnaphon Yongchaiyudh
- Parents: Bounkhong (father); Thongsy (mother)

Prince Phetsarath Ratanavongsa (Somdej Chao Maha Uparaja Petsaraj Ratanavongsa (Lao: ສົມເດັຈເຈົ້າ ມຫາ ອຸປຣາຊ ເພັຊຣາຊ ຣັຕນວົງສາ) (19 January 1890 – 14 October 1959) was the 1st Prime Minister of Luang Phrabang in French Laos from 21 August 1941 to 10 October 1945, and Head of State of Laos between 12 October 1945 and 24 April 1946.

== Biography ==
=== Early life ===
Phetsarath was born on 19 January 1890 in the Kingdom of Luang Phrabang, Siam, the second son of Oupahat Bounkhong and his second wife, Princess Thongsy. One of his younger brothers was Souvanna Phouma. Bounkong's eleventh wife was the mother of Souphanouvong. Luang Phrabang became a French protectorate in 1893. Phetsarath went to study at the colonial Lycée Chasseloup-Laubat in Saigon and continued on in 1905 at the Lycée Montaigne and to the École coloniale in Paris. He returned to Laos in 1912, married Princess Nhin Kham Venne in 1913, and started working as an interpreter for his father.

=== Government service: 1914–1941 ===
In 1914, he became a clerk at the Office of the French governor in Vientiane. Two years later he was promoted to assistant secretary to the French governor. In 1919 he received the title of Somdeth Chao Ratsaphakhinay, a title held by his father and one of the highest ranks in the country. That same year he was named Director of Indigenous Affairs of Laos operating under the French governor in Laos.

As the country's last uparaja, he became a leading figure of modern Laos. He established the system of ranks and titles of the civil service, promotion and pension plans, and created a Lao consultative assembly, reorganized the king's Advisory Council. Phetsarath reorganized the administrative system of the Buddhist clergy, and established a system of schools for educating monks in Pali. He created the Institute of Law and Administration to train entry level officers (Samien) who would then move up the ladder as Phouxouei, Chao Meuang, and Chao Khoueng successively. He set up rules to reward, reassign, and promote deserving civil servants, and created the judicial system, including civil and penal codes.

=== Japanese occupation and Lao Issara: 1941–1957 ===
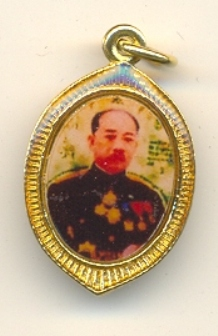
Good-luck charms of Prince Phetsarath, whom many Lao believe possessed magical powers, are widely sold in Laos today

Phetsarath played a dominant role in Lao politics before and after the Japanese occupation. He was the Prime Minister of Luang Phrabang, beginning in August 1941, ascending in prominence under the promises for power from Japan. From 1941 to 1945, Phetsarath attempted to supplant officials in Laos and Vietnam, but in the regions of Vietnam, the resistance from the local proletariat was too strong.

In March 1945 Japan overthrew the French rule in all of Indochina, including Laos. On 8 April 1945 King Sisavang Vong had declared–under Japanese pressure and at the urging of Phetsarath–that his kingdom was no longer a French protectorate. Shortly thereafter however, on 28 August 1945, Japan surrendered.

In the ensuing power vacuum, Phetsarath moved to unite the southern provinces of Laos with Luang Phrabang. This put him at odds with the pro-French King Sisavang Vong, who had agreed with the French that he intended to have the country resume its former status as a French colony. Phetsarath sent a telegram to all Laotian provincial governors notifying them that the Japanese surrender did not affect Laos' status as independent and warning them to resist any foreign intervention. On 15 September Phetsarath declared a unified Kingdom of Laos which led the King to dismiss him from his post as prime minister on 10 October.

Phetsarath and other Lao nationalists then created the Lao Issara (Free Laos) movement and took control of the country. The Lao Issara provisional assembly under Phetsarath proclaimed the deposition of the King and appointed Phetsarath as "Head of State". As the French retook control of Laos, Phetsarath fled in April 1946 to Thailand, where he led the Lao Issara government-in-exile. The group was dissolved in 1949 and its former members were allowed to return to Laos under amnesty.

=== Return: 1957–1959 ===
In March 1957, he returned to Vientiane where he received a wild welcome. On 10 April 1957, he traveled to Luang Prabang by car and was received by an enormous crowd of citizens, government officials, and members of the police and the army. On 16 April he paid a courtesy call to King Sisavang Vong and was given back his old title of Uparaja of the Kingdom of Laos. In December 1957 he visited Samneua and Phongsaly where Souphanouvong symbolically offered the return of the Pathet Lao's two regrouping provinces to the Kingdom of Laos.

He was offered an official government residence in Vientiane, but preferred to stay in his villa, Xieng Keo, in Luang Prabang with his Thai consort, Mom Aphiphorn. In early October 1959 the Phoui Sananikone Government decided to use Phetsarath's official residence in Vientiane as the new prime minister's office. They vacated the building and shipped his personal belongings by boat to Luang Prabang, which upset him immensely. On 14 October 1959 Phetsarath was taken ill to the hospital, suffering from a severe brain hemorrhage. A French doctor operated on him, but it was already too late. He never regained consciousness and he died at the age of 69.

In part because of his popularity and in part because of his perceived shakti/shiva power, many Lao people hang his picture in their homes.

== Awards and decorations ==
- (France) Legion of Honour
- Chevalier of the Ordre des Palmes académiques (France)
- Sena Jayaseddh Medal (Kingdom of Cambodia)
- Officer of the Royal Order of Sowathara (Cambodia)
- Other decorations
