= French protectorate of Laos =

1893–1953 French protectorate in southeast Asia

Kingdom of Luang Prabang (1893–1945; 1946–1947): ພຣະຣາຊອານາຈັກຫລວງພະບາງ (Lao); Royaume de Luang Prabang (French); Kingdom of Laos (1945–1946; 1947–1953): ພຣະຣາຊອານາຈັກລາວ (Lao); Royaume du Laos (French)
- 1893–1945; 1946–1953
- Flag (1893–1952) Coat of arms (1949–1953)

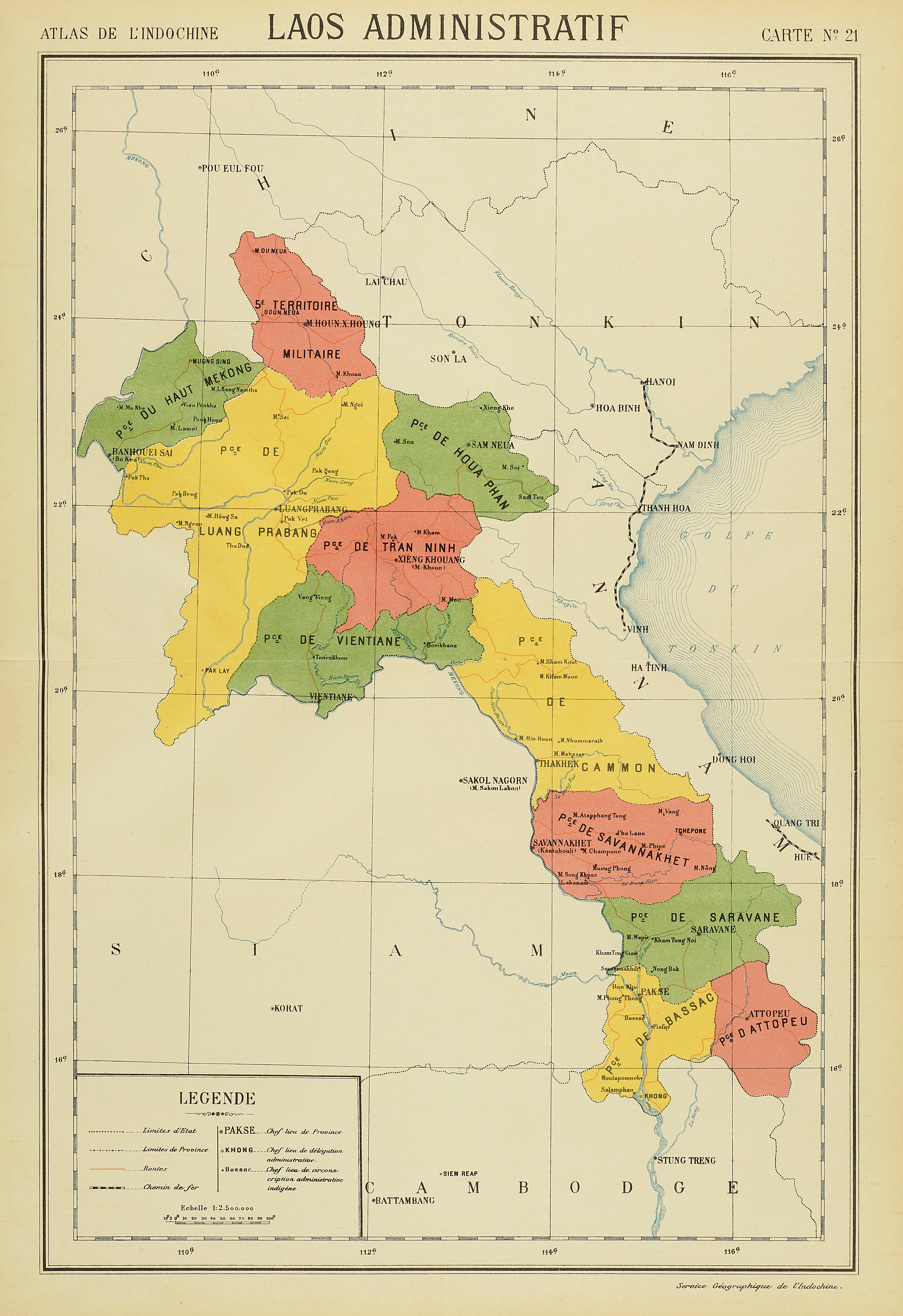
- Status: Protectorate of France (1893–1899); constituent territory of French Indochina (1899–1953)
- Capital: Vientiane (official); Luang Prabang (royal)
- Common languages: French (official); Lao (common)
- Religion: Theravada Buddhism; Roman Catholicism
- Demonyms: Laotian; Lao
- Government: Monarchy under colonial administration (1893–1947); Constitutional monarchy within the French Union (1947–1953)
- King
  - 1868–1895: Oun Kham
  - 1895–1904: Zakarine
  - 1904–1953: Sisavang Vong
- Resident-Superior
  - 1894–1895 (first): Auguste Pavie (Note: as Commissioner-General)
  - 1954–1955 (last): Michel Breal (Note: as Commissioner-General)
- Prime Minister
  - 1941–1945 (first): Phetsarath
  - 1951–1953 (last): Souvanna Phouma
- Legislature: None (rule by decree) (until 1947); Parliament (from 1947)
  - Upper house: Royal Council (from 1947)
  - Lower house: National Assembly (from 1947)
- Historical era: New Imperialism
  - Protectorate established: 3 October 1893
  - Part of French Indochina: 19 April 1899
  - Champasak annexed: 22 November 1904
  - Japanese-backed state: 8 April 1945
  - Lao Issara government: 12 October 1945
  - French restoration: 24 April 1946
  - Kingdom of Laos: 11 May 1947
  - Associated state: 19 July 1949
  - Independence: 22 October 1953
  - Affirmance: 21 July 1954
- Currency: Piastre
Preceded by
1893: Kingdom of Luang Prabang
Principality of Phuan
1904: Kingdom of Champasak
1904: Kingdom of Siam
1946: Kingdom of Laos (Lao Issara)
Succeeded by
1945: Kingdom of Laos (Japanese-backed)
1947: Kingdom of Laos

The French protectorate of Laos (French: Protectorat français du Laos) was a French protectorate in Southeast Asia of what is today Laos between 1893 and 1953—with a brief interregnum as a Japanese-backed state in 1945—which constituted part of French Indochina. It was established over the Siamese vassal, the Kingdom of Luang Phrabang, following the Franco-Siamese crisis of 1893. It was integrated into French Indochina and in the following years further Siamese vassals, the Principality of Phuan and Kingdom of Champasak, were annexed into it in 1899 and 1904, respectively.

The protectorate of Luang Prabang was nominally under the rule of its King, but actual power lay with a local French Governor-General, who in turn reported to the Governor-General of French Indochina. The later annexed regions of Laos were, however, purely under French rule. During World War II, the protectorate briefly proclaimed independence under Japanese occupation in 1945. After the surrender of Japan shortly thereafter, the restoration of French control over the country was opposed by the newly established Lao Issara government, who ultimately failed by April 1946. The protectorate was reestablished, but soon afterward the Kingdom of Laos was expanded to include all Laotian regions and granted self-government within the French Union. It formally became an associated state in 1949 and achieved full independence after the Franco-Lao Treaty in 1953, during the final stages of the First Indochina War. The final dissolution of French Indochina came with the 1954 Geneva Conference.

== Establishment of a protectorate ==
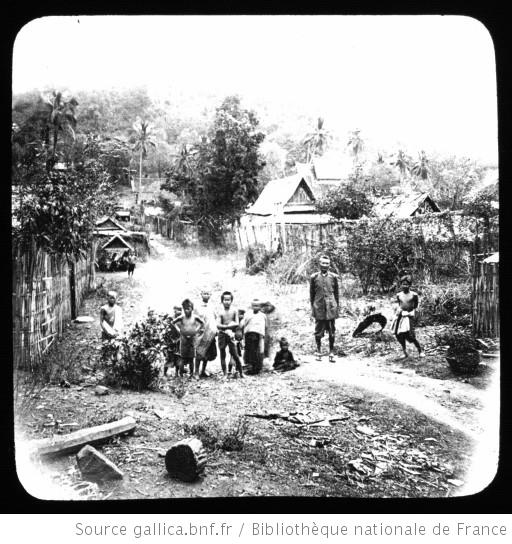
A French government official and Lao children in Luang Prabang, 1887

After the acquisition of Cambodia in 1863, French explorers led by Ernest Doudart de Lagrée went on several expeditions along the Mekong River to find possible trade relations for the territories of French Cambodia and Cochinchina (modern-day Southern Vietnam) to the south. In 1885, a French consulate was established in the Kingdom of Luang Phrabang, which was a vassal kingdom to Siam (modern-day Thailand). Siam, led by king Chulalongkorn, soon feared that France was planning to annex Luang Prabang and signed a treaty with the French on 7 May 1886 which recognised Siam's suzerainty over the Lao kingdoms.

By the end of 1886, Auguste Pavie was named vice-consul to Luang Prabang and was in charge of expeditions occurring in Laotian territory, with the possibility of turning Laos into a French territory. In 1888, outlaws from China known as the Black Flag Army attacked Siam and its vassal state of Luang Prabang by sacking its capital. Pavie and French forces later intervened and evacuated the Lao royal family to safety. Additional French troops from Hanoi later arrived to expel the Black Flags from Luang Prabang. Following his return to the city, King Oun Kham requested a French protectorate over his kingdom. Pavie later sent Oun Kham's request to the French government in Paris. The bill designating Luang Prabang a protectorate of France was signed on 27 March 1889 between both sides despite a Siamese protest.

After an ultimatum was given by Pavie, now resident minister to Siam in Bangkok, in August 1892 to the Siamese government, a diplomatic crisis took place in 1893, culminating in the Paknam incident when France, contrary to promises it had made to Great Britain, entered Bangkok with warships. The kingdom was forced to recognise French control over the eastern side of the Mekong River. Pavie continued to support French expeditions in Laotian territory and gave the territory its modern-day name of Laos. Following Siam's acceptance of the ultimatum, to cede the lands east of the Mekong including its islands, the Protectorate of Laos was officially established and the administrative capital moved from Luang Prabang to Vientiane. However, Luang Prabang remained the seat of the royal family, whose power was reduced to figureheads while the actual power was transferred over to French officials including the vice consulate and Resident-General. In January 1896, France and the United Kingdom signed an accord recognising the border between French Laos and British Burma.

== Administrative reorganisation ==
In 1898, Laos was fully integrated into the French Indochina union that was created in 1887 by unifying French possessions in Vietnam and Cambodia. A colonial governor was later installed in Vientiane and Laos was reorganised from two provinces (Haut-Laos and Bas-Laos) to ten provinces. The royal seat at Luang Prabang was still seen as the official ruler of the province and a royal court still remained, but it was later to be consisted of French appointed officials. The remaining nine provinces were directly ruled under the French government in Vientiane, with each province having a resident governor and military post. To financially support the colonial government, taxes were introduced and imposed on the population.

In 1902, a treaty with Siam forced the kingdom to also surrender lands on the western side of the Mekong River. These lands now form the province of Sainyabuli and the western half of Champasak Province. In 1904, the present border between Laos and Cambodia was established after Siam ceded Meluprey (Preah Vihear Province) and the Kingdom of Champasak to the French. Unlike in the annexation of the Kingdom of Luang Prabang, which had become an official French protectorate at least nominally under the rule of the royal house, the French administration saw no benefit in a protectorate treaty with Champasak. For this reason, Champasak was declared dissolved on 22 November 1904; the area was then managed directly by the colonial administration. By internal reclassification of the provinces and by giving some of the southern areas to French Cambodia, the former Kingdom of Champasak disappeared from the map, leaving only the Champasak Province. However, the last King of Champasak, Ratsadanay, was allowed to keep his title for life and became governor of Champasak province, whose administrative center was relocated to Pakse in 1908. In 1934 he was deposed by the French due to his age.

French plans to expand the territory of Laos ended in 1907, after Siam began co-operating with the British to control French expansion in Indochina, which the British Empire feared would have eventually led to a French annexation of Siam, upsetting the region's balance of power. Within French Administration in 1904, despite Cambodia's historical claim, Laos ceded Stung Treng Province in exchange of the royal capital of Champassak which was temporally under Cambodia's Administration. In addition, prior to the Holy Man's Rebellion, the province of Kontum and Pleiku was placed under the French Protectorate of Annam.

== Colonialism in Laos ==
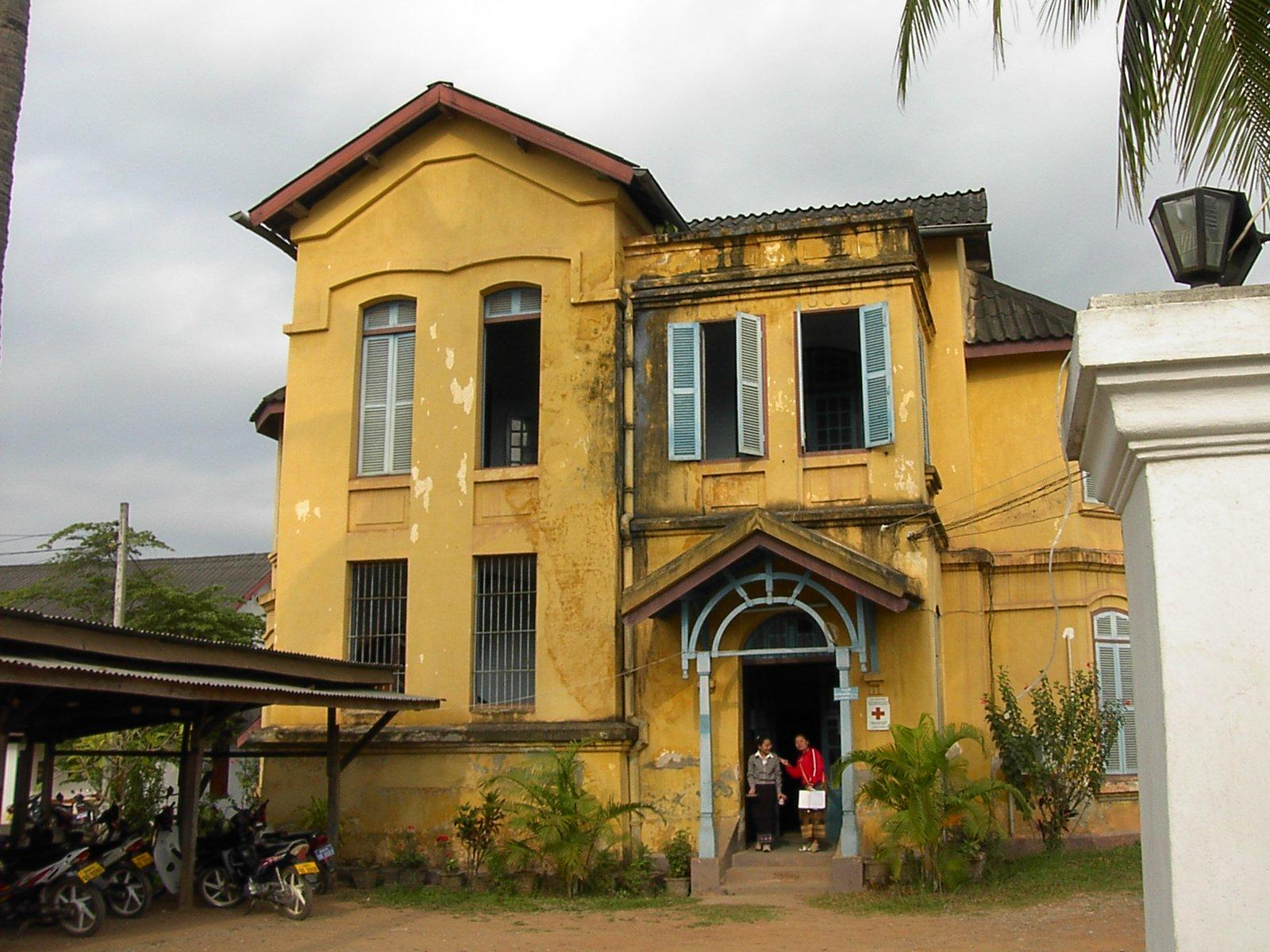
A typical example of French colonial architecture (now a health centre) in Luang Prabang

Having been unsuccessful in their grand plan to annex Siam and with Laos being the least populated of its Indochinese possessions (the population was estimated to be 470,000 in 1900) and lacking seaports for trade, the French lost much interest in Laos, and for the next fifty years it remained a backwater of the French empire in Indochina. Officially, the Kingdom of Luang Prabang remained a protectorate with internal autonomy, but in practice it was controlled by French residents while the rest of Laos was governed as a colony. King Sisavang Vong, who became King of Luang Prabang in 1904, remained conspicuously loyal to the French through his 55-year reign.

Economically, the French did not develop Laos to the scale that it had in Vietnam and many Vietnamese were recruited to work in the government in Laos instead of the Laotian people, causing some conflicts between locals and the government. Economic development occurred very slowly in Laos and was initially fuelled primarily by rice cultivation and distilleries producing rice alcohol. Nevertheless, the French did not plan to expand the Laotian economy and left commercial activity to the local populations. Geographic isolation also led to Laos being less influenced from France compared to other French colonies and in a 1937 estimate, only 574 French civilians along with a smaller number of government workers lived in Laos, a figure significantly smaller than in Vietnam and Cambodia. Under the French rule, the Vietnamese were encouraged to migrate to Laos, which was seen by the French colonists as a rational solution to a practical problem within the confines of an Indochina-wide colonial space. By 1943, the Vietnamese population stood at nearly 40,000, forming the majority in the largest cities of Laos and enjoying the right to elect their own leaders. As a result, 53% of the population of Vientiane, 85% of Thakhek and 62% of Pakse were Vietnamese, with only an exception of Luang Prabang where the population was predominantly Lao. As late as 1945, the French even drew up an ambitious plan to move massive Vietnamese population to three key areas, i.e. the Vientiane Plain, Savannakhet region, Bolaven Plateau, which was only discarded by Japanese invasion of Indochina. Otherwise, according to Martin Stuart-Fox, the Lao might well have lost control over their own country.

Social reforms also occurred under French administration, such as the suppression of banditry, abolishment of slavery, and ending the legal discrimination of the Lao Theung and Lao Soung people by the Lao Loum majority. Vietnamese and Chinese merchants also later arrived to repopulate the towns (particularly Vientiane) and revive trade and some Lao Loum were later allowed to participate in local government. Despite these social reforms, many minority groups, especially the hill tribes of the Lao Soung, did not benefit from French rule and were not, if at all, influenced by French culture.

=== Revolts ===
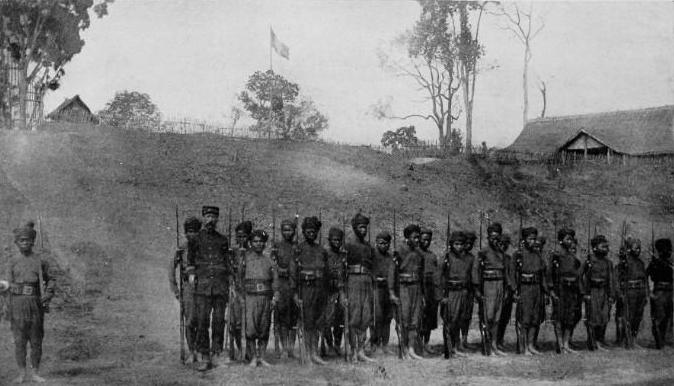
Local Lao soldiers in the French Colonial guard, c.1900

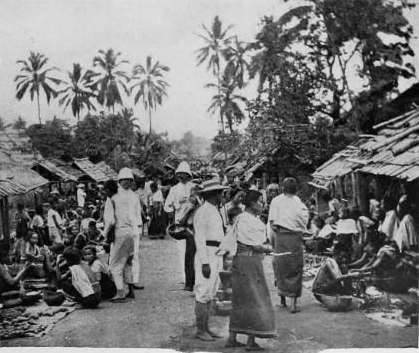
Market in Luang Prabang c.1900

In 1901, a revolt broke out in the south of Laos in the Bolaven Plateau among groups of Lao Theung led by Ong Keo, who was a self-proclaimed phū mī bun (holy man) who led a messianic cult. The revolt challenged French control over Laos and was not fully suppressed until 1910, when Ong Keo was killed. However, his successor and lieutenant, Ong Kommandam, would become an early leader in the Lao nationalist movement.

Between 1899 and 1910, political unrest in the northern Phôngsali Province occurred as local hill tribe chiefs challenged French rule and assimilation policies being carried out in the highlands. At the height of the revolt, the unrest spread to the highlands of Tonkin (northern Vietnam) and was largely concentrated among the minority groups of the Khmu and Hmong. Although the revolt initially started as a resistance against French influence and tightening of administration, it later changed objective into stopping the French suppression of the opium trade.

Instability continued in the north of Laos in 1919 when Hmong groups, who were the chief opium producers in Indochina, revolted against French taxation and special status given to the Lao Loum, who were minorities in the highlands, in a conflict known as the War of the Insane. Hmong rebels claimed that both Lao and French officials were treating them as subordinate and uncivilised groups and were later defeated in March 1921. After the revolt, the French government granted Hmongs partial autonomy in the Xiangkhouang Province.

=== Economic and social developments ===
Despite the unrest among minority hill tribes in the north, the central and southern portions of Laos saw a more favourable comparison under French rule versus Siamese rule and a considerable re-migration of Lao from the Isan area of northeastern Siam to Laos boosted the population and revived trade. Mekong valley cities such as Vientiane and Savannakhet grew considerably and the founding of Pakse fully asserted French rule over southern Laos, although cities still largely contained significant Vietnamese and Chinese minorities.

To compete with Siamese trade, the French proposed a railway linking Hanoi with Vientiane but the plans were never approved. Nevertheless, infrastructure did improve for the first time in Laos as French colonists constructed Route nationale 13, linking Vientiane with Pakse and the road continues to remain the most important highway in Laos today. In 1923, a law school opened in Vientiane to train local Laotians interested in participating in the government; however, a large portion of students at the school were Vietnamese, who continued to dominate political offices.

Although tin mining and coffee cultivation began in the 1920s, the country's isolation and difficult terrain meant that Laos largely remained economically unviable to the French. More than 90% of the Lao remained subsistence farmers, growing just enough surplus produce to sell for cash to pay their taxes.

Although the French did impose an assimilation program in Laos as in Vietnam, they were slow to fully enforce it due to the isolation and lack of economic importance in the colony. Schools were found primarily in major cities and it was not until the 1920s that rural areas began to be exposed to French education. By the 1930s, literacy rates among the Lao Loum and populations in the lowlands had increased considerably and Laotian students began to receive higher education in Hanoi or Paris. However, progress was stagnant in the highlands, where hill tribes were either too isolated to reach or refused to adopt the education system that was based on the foreign French language.

Most of the French who came to Laos as officials, settlers or missionaries developed a strong affection for the country and its people, and many devoted decades to what they saw as bettering the lives of the Lao. Some took Lao wives, learned the language, became Buddhists and "went native"—something more acceptable in the French Empire than in the British. With the racial attitudes typical of Europeans at this time, however, they tended to classify the Lao as gentle, amiable, childlike, naïve and lazy, regarding them with what one writer called "a mixture of affection and exasperation".

French contribution to Lao nationalism, apart from the creation of the Lao state itself, was made by the oriental specialists of the French School of the Far East (École Française d'Extrême-Orient), who undertook major archaeological works, found and published Lao historical texts, standardised the written Lao language, renovated neglected temples and tombs and in 1931, founded the Independent Lao Buddhist Institute in Vientiane, where Pali was taught so that the Lao could either study their own ancient history or Buddhist texts.

== Laos during World War II ==
Laos might have drifted along as a backwater of the French Empire indefinitely had it not been for dramatic outside events that heavily impacted the nation from 1940 onwards.

On 22 September 1940, Japanese forces entered French Indochina. This was done with reluctant cooperation from the Vichy French authorities, who had been put into position following the French defeat by Germany a few months earlier. The subsequent occupation then occurred gradually, with Japanese garrisons being stationed across Indochina which was still administered by the French.

Earlier, in 1932, Plaek Phibunsongkhram, prime minister of Siam, overthrew the king and established his own military dictatorship in the country. He later renamed the country to Thailand, with plans to unify all Tai peoples, including the Lao, under one nation. Around October 1940 Thailand, sensing French weakness from the years previous events, began attacking the eastern banks of the Mekong between Vientiane and Champassak Province. This would erupt into a full Thai invasion in January 1941. After initial Thai victories their offensive stalled, and the French scored a great naval victory at Ko Chang, leading to a stalemate. The Japanese mediated a ceasefire and compelled the French colonial government to cede Champassak and Xaignabouli Province in Laos and Battambang Province in Cambodia to Thailand, ending the war.

The loss of the territories was a massive blow to French prestige in Indochina. The dominant Laotian province of Luang Prabang (the previous, and now mostly formal, Kingdom of Luang Phrabang) demanded sovereignty over all of Laos as compensation, a proposition headed by French-educated Crown Prince Savang Vatthana. A secret French report from March 1941 recognized nationalistic aspirations among the people of Laos, but feared the royal house of Champasak might choose to align themselves with Thailand should they become subordinate to another royal house. The territorial loss had already weakened French hold in the region. Savang Vatthana and Resident-Superior Maurice Roques signed an agreement on 21 August 1941 which attached the provinces of Xiangkhouang and Vientiane to the Kingdom of Luang Prabang, and placed the protectorate on the same footing as Cambodia and Annam. The renewed focus on Laos also brought significant modernization of the kingdoms administration and the French also said they would not object should the kingdom further extend itself southwards. Prince Phetsarath became the first prime minister while a new advisory council for King Sisavang Vong was headed by Savang Vatthana.

To maintain support and expel Thai influence Governor-General of Indochina Jean Decoux encouraged the rise of a Lao nationalist movement, the Movement for National Renovation, which sought to defend Lao territory from Thai expansion. A French report stated "If the protectorate government does not succeed in creating an autonomous Laotian individuality—at least among those who have received education—then they will feel themselves increasingly attracted towards the neighboring country and this situation will create new difficulties". More schools were built in Laos during this period than in the last 40 years and the French School of the Far East was even renamed the "Temple for the National Idea of Laos". The movement also published a propaganda newspaper, Lao Nyai (Great Laos) in January 1941, slamming Thai policies over the Lao people and the ceded lands while promoting a sense of identity across Laos. It ran poetry competitions that celebrated Lao culture and history, and ran columns that reintroduced the ‘glorious lineage’ of the modern Lao from the time of Lan Xang. The paper, however, was not allowed to stray outside official French policy or to become explicitly nationalistic. The paper also covered the movements of King Sisavang Vong who, emboldened by the expansion of his kingdom and of secret French assurances of further expansion, made trips to several southern cities, including Champasak, on his way to Phnom Penh in 1941. In the south of the country later in the war, the Lao-Seri movement was formed in 1944 which unlike the Movement for National Renovation was not supportive of the French and declared a "Laos for Laotians" policy aimed at achieving outright independence.

== Japanese-backed state ==
In 1944, the liberation of Paris under General Charles de Gaulle occurred. At the same time, Imperial Japanese troops were being largely defeated in the Pacific Front and in a last-minute attempt to draw support Japan dissolved French control over its Indochinese colonies in March 1945. Large numbers of French officials in Laos were then imprisoned or executed by the Japanese. The staunchly pro-French King Sisavang Vong was also imprisoned and forced by the Japanese, and at much urging from Prince Phetsarath, into declaring the French protectorate over his kingdom ended, while entering the nation into the Greater East Asia Co-Prosperity Sphere on 8 April 1945. Prince Phetsarath remained as prime minister in the newly independent puppet state.

After Japan's surrender in August, Prince Phetsarath moved to unite the southern provinces with the now independent Luang Prabang. This put him at odds with King Sisavong and the royal court, the King had already agreed with the French that he intended to have the country resume its former status as a French colony. Prince Phetsarath urged the King to reconsider and sent telegrams to all Laotian provincial governors notifying them that the Japanese surrender did not affect Laos' status as independent and warned them to resist any foreign intervention. On 15 September he declared the unification of the Kingdom of Laos with the southern regions; this caused the King to dismiss him from his post as prime minister on 10 October.

== French restoration ==
Map of the French reoccupation of Laos in 1946

In the ensuing power vacuum of neither French or Japanese control, the dismissed Prince Phetsarath and other Lao nationalists formed the Lao Issara (Free Laos) which on 12 October 1945 took control of the government and reaffirmed the country's independence. Katay Don Sasorith, finance minister in the new government, wrote after the war that while the return of the status quo was perhaps desirable to Crown Prince Savang "who had never worked in his life and who had never been concerned with the needs and aspirations of the Lao people" it was a "total misunderstanding of the evolution of our sentiments and views since the Siamese aggression of 1940 and the Japanese action of 1945. We could not allow it". The Lao Issara government asked the King to step down and await a decision regarding the future of the monarchy and on 10 November a group of 30 armed men led by Prince Sisoumang Saleumsak and Prince Bougnavat marched on the palace and put the royal family under house arrest.

The situation had become chaotic in overall Indochina, the Chinese 93rd division of General Lu Han occupied and disarmed the Japanese in the northern half of the colony while the British, under General Douglas Gracey, did the same in the south. The British facilitated the French restoration while the Chinese obstructed it. All the while, the communist Viet Minh began rising against the new occupiers and the French return in Vietnam. Sympathies to all involved factions; French, Thai, Vietnamese, Royal, Nationalist, could be found in Laos and the political situation became extremely confused. The monarchy of Luang Prabang had the promises of a united Kingdom of Laos assured by de Gaulle and continued their support for French protection. They were also worried about perceived Chinese and Vietnamese threats due to their inability to in any way defend themselves. Worries about the Viet Minh were also prevalent among the Lao Issara supporters and Prince Phetsarath; in his appeal to the alles in October 1945 he said that the Lao "had become, on their own soil, a poor and backward minority" in reference to the Vietnamese majority in all major towns in Laos (aside from Luang Prabang).

The Lao Issara government started to lose control of the country by early 1946. They had fast ran out of money and could not rely on any foreign support due to Allied support for the return of the French. The main weakness of the Lao Issara has been cited to be that it always remained a small urban-based movement, failing to connect with the rural population of Laos. In a last desperate attempt to legitimize their government the Lao Issara asked King Sisavang Vong to re-ascend the throne as constitutional monarch, to which he agreed. The withdrawal of the Chinese led to the French, under Colonel Hans Imfeld of the provisional French government, entering the capital of Vientiane towards the end of April 1946, freeing French prisoners with a French-Lao force supported by Prince Boun Oum of Champasak. By May they had reached Luang Prabang and the Lao Issara fled in exile to Thailand.

== End of colonialism in Laos ==
As the French administration was reestablished they found Laos had changed more than they had realized. Even the pro-French Laotians only saw the return of the French as temporary, although necessary, step on the road to full independence. On 27 August 1946 an agreement was signed that a unified Kingdom of Laos would become a constitutional monarchy within the French Union. To ensure that the royal house of Luang Prabang was to ascend to the ruling position in this agreement, a secret protocol had Prince Boun Oum renounce the claims of the house of Champasak in return for becoming Inspector-General of the new Kingdom for life. The provinces annexed by Thailand in 1941 were returned to their respective nations in November after France threatened to block Thai entry into the United Nations. Elections were held in December for a new Constituent Assembly which met in March 1947 and endorsed a new constitution, giving birth to the Kingdom of Laos on 11 May 1947, still a member of the somewhat reorganized Indochinese Federation. The constitution introduced a bicameral parliament.

The exiled Lao Issara meanwhile started to fracture. They had conducted small guerrilla raids against the French with the help of the Viet Minh, but after Thailand started shifting towards a pro-French policy in 1947, Lao Issara had to cease their military activities from the country. Prince Souphanouvong, who had previously been alienated during the group's ruling period in 1945–46 due to his strong support for the Viet Minh now argued that they fully relocate to inside Viet Minh controlled territory and continue their operations there. When this was rejected he resigned from the Lao Issara and fully joined the Viet Minh. He would become the leader of the communist Pathet Lao.

Meanwhile, greater autonomy for Laos was granted in July 1949 from both internal and external pressure, this satisfied the Lao Issara who dissolved the group and gradually returned to Laos under amnesty. Laos could at this point join the United Nations even though their foreign affairs and national defense was still controlled by France. Following world-wide anti-colonial sentiment and France's loss of control of Indochina during the First Indochina War against the Viet Minh, the Kingdom of Laos was granted full independence in the Franco-Lao Treaty of 1953, reaffirmed in the 1954 Geneva Conference which ended French control of all of Indochina.

== See also ==
- History of Laos (1945–present)
- List of administrators of the French protectorate of Laos

== Sources ==
- Kenneth Conboy, War in Laos 1954–1975, Squadron/Signal publications 1994
- Marini, G.F. de. (1998). A New and Interesting Description of the Lao Kingdom (1642–1648). Translated by Walter E. J. Tips and Claudio Bertuccio. Bangkok, Thailand: White Lotus Press.
- Moppert, François. 1981. Le révolte des Bolovens (1901–1936). In Histoire de l'Asie du Sud-est: Révoltes, Réformes, Révolutions, Pierre Brocheux (ed.), pp. 47–62. Lille: Presses Universitaires de Lille.
- Murdoch, John (1974) "The 1901–1902 Holy Man's Rebellion", Journal of the Siam Society 62(1), pp. 47–66.
- Ngaosrivathana, Mayoury & Breazeale, Kenon (ed). (2002). Breaking New Ground in Lao History: Essays on the Seventh to Twentieth Centuries. Chiangmai, Thailand: Silkworm Books.
- Phothisane, Souneth. (1996). The Nidan Khun Borom: Annotated Translation and Analysis, Unpublished doctoral dissertation, University of Queensland. [This is a full and literal translation of a Lān Xāng chronicle]
- Stuart-Fox, Martin. "The French in Laos, 1887–1945." Modern Asian Studies (1995) 29#1, pp. 111–139.
- Stuart-Fox, Martin. A history of Laos (Cambridge University Press, 1997)
