= Katay Don Sasorith =

Laotian politician

- ກະຕ່າຍ ໂດນສະໂສລິດ
- Born: July 12, 1904; Vientiane, Laos, French Indochina
- Died: December 29, 1959 (aged 55); Vientiane, Laos
- Other name: William Rabbit
- Occupations: Politician; author
- Political party: National Progressive Party

Katay Don Sasorith (Lao: ກະຕ່າຍ ໂດນສະໂສລິດ; July 12, 1904 – December 29, 1959) was a Laotian nationalist, politician, author, and the 8th Prime Minister of Laos (October 25, 1954 – March 21, 1956).

After working as a civil servant, Katay became the chief spokesman of the national resistance movement against the Japanese and then the French during and after World War II. He held a post as Minister of Finance in the provisional government, but had to join the government in exile in Thailand. He published a newspaper under the pseudonym William Rabbit (Katay meaning rabbit).

After returning to Vientiane in 1949, he was appointed the Minister of Finance from 1951 to 1954. Katay was elected prime minister in 1954. In that position, he managed to play on U.S. fears of the Viet Minh invading Laos to get substantial aid for his country. He was succeeded in 1956 by prince Souvanna Phouma.

Katay Don Sasorith died in Vientiane, Laos.

== Works ==
- Contribution à l’histoire du mouvement d’indépendance national Lao ("Contribution to the History of the Lao National Independence Movement", 1948)

Political offices
Preceded by Souvanna Phouma	Prime Minister of Laos; 1954–1956	Succeeded by Souvanna Phouma
