= Quinim Pholsena =

Laotian politician

Quinim Pholsena (Lao: ກິນິມ ພົລເສນາ; 18 November 1915 – 1 April 1963) was a Laotian politician and the Foreign Minister of the Kingdom of Laos from 1962 to 1963, under Prime Minister Souvanna Phouma.

== Early life ==
Pholsena was born 18 November 1915, Pakse, Champasak to a Chinese merchant father and a Laotian mother. As a teenager Pholsena lived in the household of Souvanna Phouma and was accepted as the adopted son of their household. With the backing of Prince Souvanna, Pholsena served various high-level administrative ranks in the government, notably as the district officer of Pakse from 1949 to 1952 and then as the governor of Xam Neua.

== Life in politics ==
After the coup of 1960, a coalition government was formed between neutralists, communists and rightists on 18 November 1960. On 8 December, Phouma relieved Kong Le from his command, but the next day Kong Le deposed Souvanna Phouma (who flew to Phnom Penh with Prince Boun Om and his other ministers) and Pholsena, then Minister of the Interior, was appointed premier, who was unrecognised. A few days later Phoumi took Vientiane and installed Boun Oum as premier. After more than a year of negotiations a coalition government was formed under the leadership of Phouma.

Pholsena, who served as interior minister in the three-week-old government, became information minister in August. Then from 1962 to 1963, he served as the foreign minister under the coalition government of Phouma.

== Assassination ==
On April 3, 1963, Pholsena returned home from a party at the King's residence in Vientiane. Pholsena and his wife arrived at their newly renovated villa. As the couple left the car, Quinim mounted the steps and one of the soldiers who was assigned to protect his villa, lance corporal Chy Song, stepped forward and fired from his submachine gun that killed him and seriously wounded his wife, who was wounded in both legs. In his signed confession, Quinim's assassin, Song, charged Quinim with trying to overthrow the government and bribing neutralist officers to defect to the Pathet Lao. His funeral was held on 11 April 1963.

== Personal life ==
Pholsena was married to Phayboun. He had 12 children: "eldest son Kenekeo Pholsena, second son Sommano Pholsena, third son Sommad Pholsena, fourth son Sommak Pholsena, fifth son Sompong Pholsena and sixth son Somphone Pholsena, as well as the fourth daughter Khemvieng Pholsena and fifth daughter Khemmani Pholsena."

- Third son Sommad Pholsena, current Vice Chairman of National Assembly of Laos , former Minister of Natural Resources and Environment, former Minister of Public Works and Transport.

== See also ==
- Souvanna Phouma

== Bibliography ==
- Stieglitz, Perry, In a little kingdom, M.E. Sharpe, 1990, ISBN 0-87332-617-2
