= Horace H. Smith =

US diplomat (1905–1976)

Horace Harrison Smith

4th United States Ambassador to Laos
- In office April 9, 1958 – June 21, 1960
- President: Dwight Eisenhower
- Preceded by: J. Graham Parsons
- Succeeded by: Winthrop G. Brown

Personal details
- Born: October 30, 1905 Xenia, Ohio
- Died: September 22, 1976 (aged 70)
- Profession: Diplomat

Horace Harrison Smith (October 5, 1905 – September 22, 1976) was an American diplomat. He was a career diplomat of the United States Foreign Service, and was the United States Ambassador to Laos from 1958 to 1960.

== Biography ==
Horace H. Smith was born in Xenia, Greene County, on October 30, 1905. He later joined the U.S. Foreign Service and became a career officer some time later. In 1932, he was a U.S. Vice Consul in the Chinese city of Guangzhou. In 1938, he was a U.S. Consul in Jinan. On March 26, 1958, President Eisenhower nominated Smith to be the United States Ambassador to Laos. He presented his credentials on April 9, 1958, and served in that position until June 21, 1960. He died on September 22, 1976, at 70 years of age.

Diplomatic posts
Preceded by J. Graham Parsons	United States Ambassador to Laos; April 9, 1958 – June 21, 1960	Succeeded by Winthrop G. Brown
