= Romanization of Lao =

Systems of transcribing the Lao alphabet into the Latin alphabet

Romanisation of Lao (Lao: ການໂຣມັນພາສາລາວ) is the transcription from Lao script to Latin script.

== History ==
There was no romanisation system in the United Nations Group of Experts on Geographical Names for Laotian script and no national romanisation system in Laos until 1996. BGN and PCGN joined Commission Nationale de Toponymie (National Commission of Toponym) and finally established a system for Lao romanisation.

== Tables ==
- American Library of Congress (LC)
- American United States Board on Geographic Names (BGN)
- British Permanent Committee on Geographical Names for British Official Use (PCGN)

=== Consonants ===
Character	Initial position			Final position
Character	IPA	BGN/PCGN	LC	IPA	BGN	LC
ກ	/k/	k		/k̚/	k
ຂ	/kʰ/	kh		—	—
ຄ	/kʰ/	kh		—	—
ງ	/ŋ/	ng		/ŋ/	ng
ຈ	/tɕ/	ch		—	—	—
ສ	/s/	s		—	—	—
ຊ	/s/	x	s	—	—	—
ຍ	/ɲ/	gn	ny	/j/	y	y
ດ	/d/	d		/t̚/	t	d
ຕ	/t/	t		—	—
ຖ	/tʰ/	th		—	—	—
ທ	/tʰ/	th		—	—	—
ນ	/n/	n		/n/	ne	n
ບ	/b/	b		/p̚/	p	b
ປ	/p/	p		—	—
ຜ	/pʰ/	ph		—	—	—
ຝ	/f/	f		—	—	—
ພ	/pʰ/	ph		—	—	—
ຟ	/f/	f		—	—	—
ມ	/m/	m		/m/	m
ຢ	/j/	y		—	—	—
ຣ	/r/, /l/	r		—	—	—
ລ	/l/	l		—	—	—
ວ	/ʋ/, /w/	v	v, w	/w/	w	w
ຫ	/h/	h		—	—	—
ອ	/ʔ/	—		—	—	—
ຮ	/h/	h	h	—		—

=== Vowel nuclei ===
The table below shows the Lao vowel nuclei, combined with the consonant ກ.

	IPA	BGN	LC	Unicode		IPA	BGN	LC	Unicode		IPA	BGN	LC	Unicode		IPA	BGN	LC	Unicode
ກະ/ກັກ	/a/	a	a	a	ກາ	/aː/	a	ā	aa
ກິ	/i/	i	i	i	ກີ	/iː/	i	ī	ii	ເກັຽະ/ເກັຍ	/iaʔ/	ia	ia		ເກັຽ/ເກຍ/ກຽກ	/ia/	ia	īa
ກຶ	/ɯ/	u	ư	y	ກື	/ɯː/	u	ư̄	yy	ເກຶອ	/ɯaʔ/	ua	ưa		ເກືອ	/ɯa/	ua	ư̄a
ກຸ	/u/	ou	u	u	ກູ	/uː/	ou	ū	uu	ກົວະ	/uaʔ/	oua	ua		ກົວ/ ກວກ	/ua/	oua	ūa
ເກະ/ເກັກ	/e/	é	e		ເກ	/eː/	é	ē	e
ແກະ/ແກັກ	/ɛ/	è	æ		ແກ	/ɛː/	è	ǣ	ei
ໂກະ/ກົກ	/o/	ô	o		ໂກ	/oː/	ô	ō	o
ເກາະ/ກັອກ	/ɔ/	o	o̜		ກໍ/ກອກ	/ɔː/	o	ō̜
ເກິ/ເກິະ	/ɤ/	eu	œ		ເກີ	/ɤː/	eu	œ̄
										ໄກ/ໃກ/ກັຍ	/aj/	ai	ai	ai/ay	ກາຍ/ກາຽ	/aːj/	ai	āi
ເກົາ	/aw/	ao	ao
ກໍາ	/am/	am	am	am

== See also ==
- Romanization
- Romanization of Thai
