= Kham Ouane Boupha =

Laotian soldier and politician

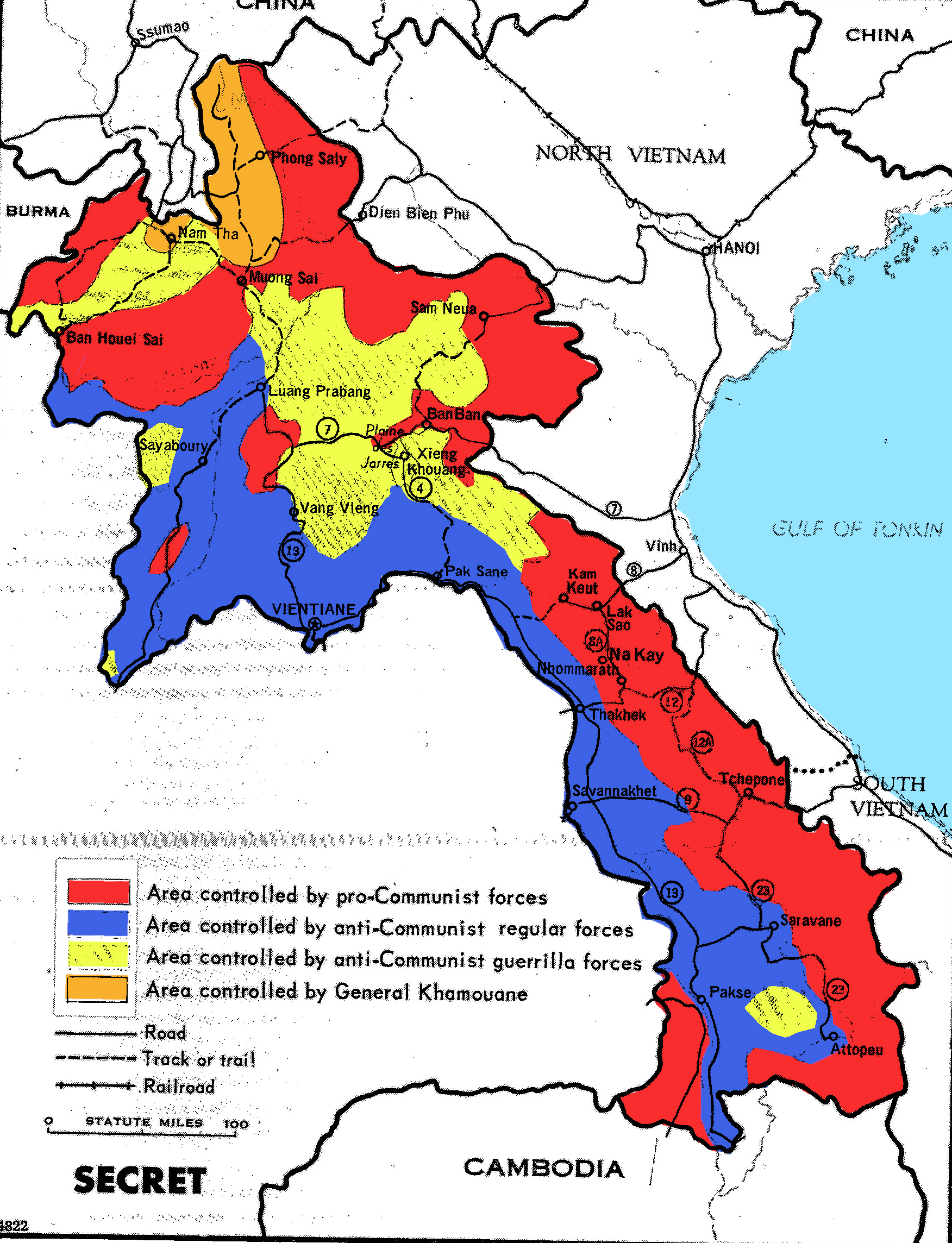
Areas controlled by Kham Ouane in Laos

Kham Ouane Boupha (born December 5, 1932, in Luang Prabang) is a Laotian soldier and politician. Appointed to command Phongsali Province in the Kingdom of Laos in 1957 or 1958 while he was in his mid-twenties, he would maintain that base throughout the impending Laotian Civil War. During that war, in April 1963, he would defect from government service to head the pro-communist Patriotic Neutralists movement. At the end of the war, as the Communists succeeded in gaining power through the Provisional Government of the National Union, Kham Ouane Boupha was appointed Deputy Minister of Defense on April 9, 1974. He was promoted to become Minister of Defense on May 12, 1975 and served as such for many years, even while he was also Minister of Justice. He retired from cabinet rank in 2006, becoming a minister in the Office of the Prime Minister.

== Background ==
The Patriotic Neutralists movement that Kham Ouane Boupha headed was an indirect result of the 1960 coup led by Captain Kong Le. When the paratroop officer took control of the Kingdom of Laos in August 1960, he founded Forces Armee Neutraliste (Neutral Armed Forces) as a non-aligned force in the Laotian Civil War separate from the Communists and the Royalists. Kong Le would subsequently lose both the Battle of Vientiane and control of Laos in December 1960 to General Phoumi Nosavan, and retreat to the Plain of Jars. Once there, Kong Le was originally helped by the Pathet Lao communists, but eventually turned away from them toward the Royalists. Dissatisfaction within FAN's ranks would lead to a split in the neutralist movement in April 1963. The Patriotic Neutralists split off as a pro-communist faction.

== Early life ==
Kham Ouane Boupha (alternate spelling Khamouane or Khammouane Boupha) was born on December 5, 1932, in Luang Prabang, the Kingdom of Laos. He was a high school dropout. His brother became a high-ranking official in the Pathet Lao.

== Military service ==
Because he was considered competent, Kham Ouane Boupha was appointed to the dual posts of governor and Military Region commander in Phongsali Province in either November 1957 or January 1958. The Royal Lao Government arranged for the Chinese military to supply the 2,000 troops under his command. In January 1958, Major Kham Ouane founded and commanded Bataillon Volontaires 11 (Battalion of Volunteers 11), deploying them throughout the province. This was a security measure in preparation for Operation Booster Shot and the subsequent election.

When Captain Kong Le seized power in his August coup, Kham Ouane declared support for him. At that time, he still had 2,000 troops under his command—a mixture of militia and the regular soldiers of BV 11. However, after General Phoumi Nosavan regained power in Laos, Kham Ouane supported him. On January 3, 1961, the troops in Phongsali were airdropped rice from Phoumi's supplies. On January 9, Brigadier General Kham Ouane offered to march on Luang Prabang and oust Kong Le's Forces Armee Neutraliste. Though he never actually attacked, his change of allegiance was clear.

Nevertheless, when a garrison from all parties to the Laotian Civil War was agreed upon in Luang Prabang, a company from BV 11 was flown in from Boun Neua. As there were few communist troops in Phongsali Province, his switch to their side was welcome. However, he had to deal with disloyalty in his ranks. In 1962, he reportedly executed two captains for attempting a coup against him.

Prime Minister Souvanna Phouma struck a deal with the People's Republic of China, allowing the Chinese to build roads within Laos. The road from Meng La, in Yunnan Province, to Phongsali City opened in January 1963. China supplied the local Pathet Lao units via that road. They also brought troops, as well as construction workers, into Laos on the all-weather highway. When the Patriotic Neutralists split from Kong Le's Forces Armee Neutraliste in April 1963, General Khamouane sided with Colonel Deuane Sunnalath and his new organization. Kham Ouane became the supreme commander of the Patriotic Neutralists in Military Region 1. Although remaining nominally independent, he coordinated his activities with the Pathet Lao. He cut communications with the Royal Lao Government and blocked his local airstrip so their airplanes could not land. By May 1964, there was a Chinese consulate in Phongsali city; the locals called it an embassy. In July 1964, the honor guard company of BV 11 in Luang Prabang was disbanded by Kong Le as being pro-communist.

In July 1965, Kham Ouane apparently executed Colonel Bountam for an attempted coup.

In autumn 1967, Kham Ouane supplied seven paratroopers to Team Sone Pet for their spying mission inside China.

== Political career ==
On April 9, 1974, Kham Ouane Boupha was named Deputy Minister of Defense in the newly formed Provisional Government of the National Union. In accordance with the new government's directives, U.S. personnel were drawn down to a 45-person Defense Attaché Office supplying the Royal Lao Army. On February 15, 1975, Kham Ouane demanded that the DAO channel aid to the PGNU so it could also be distributed to the Pathet Lao. On May 12, 1975 he became Defense Minister, succeeding to the post upon the resignation of four right-wing ministers. As Deputy Minister, he had been deprived of power over royalist forces. As Minister, he promptly halted Royalist troop movements as part of ending the Laotian Civil War and required them to pledge loyalty to the PGNU.

Kham Ouane Boupha would spend many years of service in the government of the Lao People's Democratic Republic. He was named Minister of Defense in 1992. However, he was acting as the Minister for Justice on November 2, 1996, when he promulgated Water Resources Law 005. He was reappointed as Minister of Defense in 1998. On 17–18 June 2002, he attended an ASEAN conference in Bangkok as Minister of Justice. On 29 November 2004, he was still representing Laos internationally as Minister of Justice, as he signed a treaty that day. Kham Ouane Boupha gave up serving in the Lao cabinet in 2006, but remained a Minister in the Office of the Prime Minister.

A 1 July 2010 report of That Luang Marsh in Vientiane being preserved instead of developed by Chinese into a model city quoted Kham Ouane as saying the marsh was now an environmentally protected area. He was in charge of land management.

On December 3, 2012, the Bureau of Human Resources of the Lao People's Revolutionary Party rewarded Kham Ouane Boupha's service with a housing award of 400 million kips.
