= Patriotic Neutralists =

Political movement of the Laotian Civil War

The Patriotic Neutralists were an armed political movement of the Laotian Civil War. Founded in April 1963 by a schism within the Forces Armee Neutraliste (FAN) when the latter favored alliance with the Royal Lao Army, the Patriotic Neutralists allied themselves with the opposing Communist forces in the war. The most notable military action that involved them was a devastating air raid on 13 October 1969 that killed all its officers except commanding officer Colonel Deuane Sunnalath. Although it retained a nominally separate identity from the Pathet Lao, Patriotic Neutralist leaders Deuane Sunnalath and Khamouane Boupha would succeed to ministerial posts in the communist-dominated Provisional Government of National Union on 9 April 1974.

== Background ==
The Patriotic Neutralists were indirectly created by the 1960 coup d'état led by Kong Le. When the paratrooper captain captured control of the Kingdom of Laos in August 1960, he founded Forces Armee Neutraliste (Neutral Armed Forces) as a non-aligned third side in the Laotian Civil War; the other sides were the Communists and the Royalists. Captain Kong Le would subsequently lose both the Battle of Vientiane and control of Laos in December 1960, and retreat to the Plain of Jars. Once there, he was originally helped by the Pathet Lao communists, but turned away from them toward the Royalists. Dissatisfaction within his ranks would lead to a split in the neutralist movement in April 1963. The new pro-communist faction was the Patriotic Neutralists.

== Origin ==
In April 1963, Lieutenant Deuane Sunnalath would lead a defection that established itself as a pro-communist neutralist force, the Patriotic Neutralists, as opposed to the pro-Royalist FAN. He founded the Patriotic Neutralists from units abandoning FAN. Deuane had about 250 troops under his command in Military Region 2; they allied themselves with General Khamouane Boupha's force of 1,500 in far northern Phongsali Province. The Phetsarath Artillery Battalion, which had downed an Air America resupply plane, was one of the units that joined Deuane. Battalion Parachutistes 1 (Battalion of Parachutists 1) was another, along with all of Khamouane's Neutralist Forces from Military Region 1. In the southern panhandle, the majority of Battalion Infanterie 4 (Battalion of Infantry 4) near Tchepone defected to the new movement, which allied itself with the Pathet Lao communists. On 6 April 1963, the Pathet Lao launched several simultaneous surprise attacks on the Neutralists on the Plain of Jars. On 10 April 1963, U.S. President John F. Kennedy approved U.S. military aid supply drops to bolster FAN. Although FAN was driven from its positions, it evacuated most of its vehicles and crew-served weapons to Muong Phanh.

== Joining the communists ==
By the time of the 1964 coup, the Patriotic Neutralists had been largely absorbed into the Pathet Lao, although the two sides held the first of its biannual cooperative mock political congresses in 1964. On the Plain of Jars, the coup sparked further dissension in the Neutralist movement. Two of FAN's paratroop battalions—BP 4 and BP 6—favored siding with the communists. On 27 April 1964, as the Royalist garrison withdrew from Phou San, it was attacked and defeated by communist forces as nearby FAN units deigned to intervene. However, when Pathet Lao occupied the vacated strongpoint overlooking Kong Le's headquarters at Muong Phan, his Bataillon Parachutistes 5 unsuccessfully assaulted the mountaintop. Six days later, the third mountaintop position, on Phou Nong, also fell. The defeated troops split into two columns escaping in opposite directions, with the Royalists retreating southeast while FAN withdrew to the northwest.

On 13 May 1964, as Pathet Lao troops moved to isolate the Neutralist garrisons at Muong Phan and Muong Kheung, a revolt against Kong Le broke out within FAN. His armored commander, Colonel Sourideth, encircled Kong Le's headquarters with a dozen tanks. The next day, BP 4 went over to Deuane's Patriotic Neutralists. One company of the latter was fighting in an offensive against Royalist regiment Groupement Mobile 17 (Mobile Group 17). Kong Le withdrew FAN from the Plain in good order, except for an inconsequential loss of small arms. However, in June, his armored force of 23 vehicles had to be abandoned at Muong Kheung. The American Special National Intelligence Estimate of 5 August 1965 credited the Patriotic Neutralists as an ineffectual force of 2,600 men.

The Patriotic Neutralists established their headquarters within a known no-strike zone so that it could not be bombed by air strikes. The rules of engagement followed by the American forces within the Kingdom of Laos posited a 16 kilometer wide sanctuary along the border of the Democratic Republic of Vietnam to avoid inadvertent attacks on the DRV. However, in October 1969, the American ambassador changed the rules of engagement; the protected border area was cut to eight kilometers. The Patriotic Neutralist headquarters lay in the newly exposed zone. At 0600 hours on 13 October 1969, one of the Raven FACs flying a T-28 Trojan directed a pair of F-4 Phantoms in a devastating raid on the headquarters. All of Deuane's subordinate officers were killed; however, he was in the DRV at the time.

As the communists gained power toward the end of the Laotian Civil War, the Patriotic Neutralist front was still recognized as a separate organization. Some of its leaders were appointed to positions in the communist-dominated Provisional Government of National Union. Deuane Sunnalath was appointed as Deputy Minister for Education on 9 April 1974. That same day, Khamouane Boupha was named as Deputy Minister of Defense.
