= Deuane Sunnalath =

Lieutenant and colonel in Laos

Lieutenant (later Colonel) Deuane Sunnalath (Lao: ເດືອນ ສຸນນະລາດ, 1927–1978) led a schism within neutralist forces fighting in the Laotian Civil War. After following Captain Kong Le through his 1960 coup that established a third side in the war, Deuane led a walkout from Kong Le's Forces Armee Neutraliste (Neutral Armed Forces) in April 1963. Deuane would lead his disaffected Patriotic Neutralists into an alliance with the Communists, while the remaining Neutralists in FAN would favor the Royalists. Deuane would eventually become the Deputy Minister of Education in the Provisional Government for National Union on 9 April 1974.

== Service under the French ==
Lieutenant Deuane Sunnalath (alternative spelling Deuane or Deuan Sounnarath) was born in Vientiane, the Kingdom of Laos in 1927. He originally served as an interpreter for the French military at their Vung Tau training center during the First Indochina War. In December, 1953 Aspirant Deuane and Vang Pao led a 100-man Lao contingent undergoing military training at Khang Khay, the Kingdom of Laos. Once commissioned, Deuane proved a bright, flamboyant, mercurial but capable officer. At various times, he led the Groupement de Commando Mixtes Aeroportes (Mixed Airborne Commando Group), and ran the commando training course for the Royal Lao Army.

== Service with the paratroopers ==
Deuane continued to serve in the Lao military after the French defeat, becoming a company commander in Bataillion Parachutistes 2 (Parachute Battalion 2) under Captain Kong Le. When Kong Le revolted against what he perceived as a corrupt government in August 1960, Deuane sat out the coup. However, afterward he attached himself to Kong Le as the captain tried to rally the nation to the side of the coup forces.

When General Phoumi Nosavan attacked Vientiane in a countercoup, Deuane was at Wattay just outside the city. He may have joined General Kouprasith Abhay on 8 December 1960 in the general's abortive countercoup attempt in Vientiane, but returned to Wattay upon its failure. At any rate, he was a member of the party that flew to Hanoi on 10 December to formalize the ongoing Soviet aerial supply mission to Kong Le's forces. At 0900 hours the following morning, six Russian transports landed at Wattay to unload four 105mm howitzers, six 4.2 inch mortars, and a dozen artillery experts from the People's Army of Vietnam. Despite this reinforcement by heavy weapons, Kong Le's Forces Armee Neutraliste (Neutral Armed Forces) was defeated and withdrew northward up Route 13 to the Plain of Jars. Along the route was the town of Vang Vieng about 150 kilometers north of Vientiane.

Kong Le entrusted Deuane with the task of raising and leading two new FAN battalions there, Bataillon Infanterie 1 and Bataillon Infanterie 2 (Infantry Battalions 1 and 2). When FAN's intelligence officer was arrested in Vientiane on 5 November 1961, Deuan was poised to attack the capital with those troops if the major was not released. The major walked on 7 November.

With two putative governments in power, international pressure led to talks that led to the International Agreement on the Neutrality of Laos of 23 July 1962. By 27 September 1962, Kong Le had struck an agreement for supplying American military aid to FAN. However, political dissension began to cleave FAN, as members leaned toward either the Royalist or communist sides. Communist political strategy focused on fostering Neutralist hatred of Americans, with the aim of cutting off U.S. aid while co-opting the Neutralist movement. On 22 November 1962, while Kong Le was in Hanoi for surgery, an Air America transport plane was shot down while landing on the Plain of Jars, killing the pilots. Antiaircraft gunners of the pro-communist Phetsarath Artillery Battalion were responsible. Then, on 12 February 1963, the anti-communist FAN commander of Military Region 2, Colonel Kettsana Vongsouvanh, was murdered with a bullet to the brain. Deuane was blamed for both fatal incidents; a series of assassinations were sparked by Kettsana's death, leading to a split in the Neutralist movement.

== Founding of the Patriotic Neutralists ==
When the Pathet Lao forced FAN to retreat on 6 April 1963, Deuane split the Forces Armee Neutraliste movement by splintering off a pro-communist faction, the Patriotic Neutralists. At a conference mediated by former Souvanna Phouma allies Khamsouk Keola and Heuan Mongkholvilay the three battalions of neutralists under Brigadier General Khamouane Boupha in Military Region 1's far northern Phongsali Province opted to join him. So did Battalion Parachutistes 1 (Parachute Battalion 1) and the Phetsarath Artillery Battalion in MR 2. By November 1963, nearly all of Battalion Infanterie 4 (Infantry Battalion 4) in Xepon in the Laotian southern panhandle swung over to the new Neutralist organization. Laotian Route 9 from Khe Sanh to Xepon was open to the communists. The Patriotic Neutralists would ally themselves with the communists, and serve to occupy localities that had been communist held at the time of the 1962 International Agreement on the Neutrality of Laos. Colonel Deuane would maintain a low profile into the 1970s.

== Later life ==
As the communists gained power toward the end of the Laotian Civil War, Deuane Sunnalath was appointed as Deputy Minister for Education in the Provisional Government of National Union on 9 April 1974. In 1978, he would transition to Deputy Minister of Agriculture, Forestry, and Irrigation.

While on an official mission to Moscow, Deuane Sunnalath died of a stroke in 1978.
