= Laotian Civil War =

1959–1975 conflict in Laos

- Part of the Vietnam War, the Indochina Wars, and the Cold War in Asia
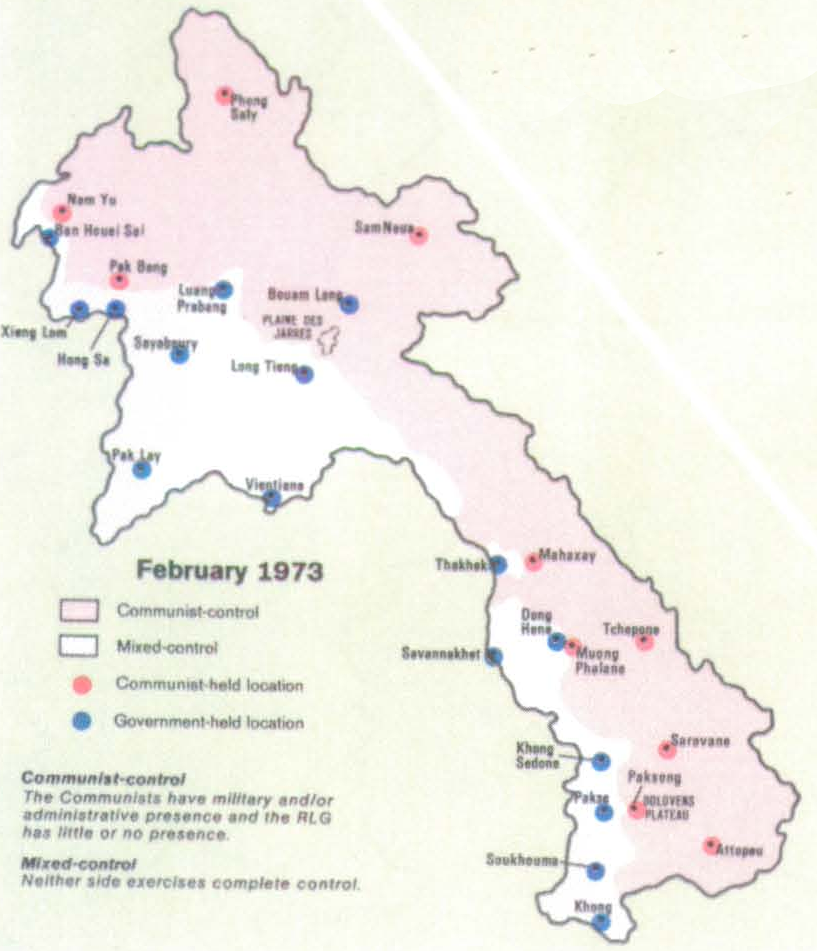
- Areas of Laos controlled by the Pathet Lao in February 1973, tinted pink
Date	23 May 1959 – 2 December 1975 (16 years, 6 months, 1 week and 2 days)
Location	Laos
Result	Pathet Lao and North Vietnamese victory: Establishment of the Lao People's Democratic Republic; End of the Kingdom of Laos; Insurgency by anti-communists

Belligerents
Pathet Lao; North Vietnam; Neutralists (1960–1962; 1963–1969); China; Soviet Union	Kingdom of Laos; Neutralists (1962–1966); United States; Thailand; Republic of China; South Vietnam

Commanders and leaders
Souphanouvong; Kaysone Phomvihane; Phoumi Vongvichit; Deuane Sunnalath; Nouhak Phoumsavanh; Hồ Chí Minh # Lê Duẩn; Phạm Văn Đồng; Lê Đức Thọ; Võ Nguyên Giáp; Lê Trọng Tấn; Văn Tiến Dũng	Sisavang Vatthana; Souvanna Phouma; Phoumi Nosavan; Vang Pao; Boun Oum; Kong Le; Lyndon B. Johnson; Richard Nixon; Henry Kissinger; Robert McNamara; Clark Clifford; Melvin Laird; Sarit Thanarat; Thanom Kittikachorn; Li Mi

Strength
8,000 (1960); 48,000 (1970); 10,000+ (1970)	50,000 soldiers (1954); 17,000–22,000 mercenaries 19,000–23,000 Hmong militiamen (1964)

Casualties and losses
Unknown c. 42,000 killed	15,000 killed c. 1,751+ killed
- 20,000–62,000 total killed

The Laotian Civil War was waged between the Communist Pathet Lao and the Royal Lao Government from 23 May 1959 to 2 December 1975. The Kingdom of Laos was a covert theater during the Vietnam War with both sides receiving heavy external support in a proxy war between the global Cold War superpowers. The fighting also involved the North Vietnamese, South Vietnamese, American and Thai armies, both directly and through irregular proxies. The war is known as the "Secret War" among the American CIA Special Activities Center, and Hmong and Mien veterans of the conflict.

The Franco–Lao Treaty of Amity and Association (signed 23 October 1953) transferred remaining French powers to the Royal Lao Government (except control of military affairs), establishing Laos as an independent member of the French Union. However, this government did not include representatives from the left wing of the Lao Issara anti-colonial armed movement. The following years were marked by a rivalry between the neutralists under Prince Souvanna Phouma, the right wing under Prince Boun Oum of Champassak, and the left-wing Lao Patriotic Front under Prince Souphanouvong and half-Vietnamese future Prime Minister Kaysone Phomvihane. Several attempts were made to establish coalition governments, and a "tri-coalition" government was finally seated in Vientiane.

The North Vietnamese Army, in collaboration with the Pathet Lao, invaded Laos in 1958 and 1959, occupying the east of the country to use for its Ho Chi Minh trail supply corridor and as a staging area for offensives into South Vietnam. There were two major theatres of the war, one for control over the Laotian Panhandle and the other was fought around the northern Plain of Jars. From 1961 onward, the US trained Hmong tribesmen to disrupt North Vietnamese operations and in 1964, the US began bombing North Vietnamese supply routes.

The North Vietnamese and Pathet Lao eventually emerged victorious in December 1975, following from North Vietnam's final victory over South Vietnam in April 1975. The conflict killed tens of thousands of people including many thousands of North Vietnamese soldiers. Unexploded ordnance (UXO), mostly from US bombing, remains a problem. According to the Laotian government in 2017, there were 29,522 deaths and 21,048 injuries from explosive ordnance during the war or as result of UXO since the end of the war.

After the communist takeover in Laos, up to 300,000 people fled to neighbouring Thailand, and Hmong rebels began an insurgency against the new government. The Hmong were persecuted as traitors, with the Laotian government and its Vietnamese allies carrying out human rights abuses against Hmong civilians. The incipient conflict between Vietnam and China also played a role with Hmong rebels being accused of receiving support from China. Over 40,000 people died in the conflict. The Lao royal family were arrested by the Pathet Lao and sent to labor camps, where most of them died in the late 1970s and 1980s, including King Savang Vatthana, Queen Khamphoui and Crown Prince Vong Savang.

== Overview ==
The 1954 Geneva Conference established Laotian neutrality. The People's Army of Vietnam (PAVN), however, continued to operate in both northern and southeastern Laos. There were repeated attempts from 1954 onward to force the North Vietnamese out of Laos, but regardless of any agreements or concessions, Hanoi had no intention of withdrawing from the country or abandoning its Laotian communist allies.

North Vietnam established the Ho Chi Minh trail as a paved highway in southeast Laos paralleling the Vietnamese border. The trail was designed to transport North Vietnamese troops and supplies to South Vietnam, as well as to aid the National Liberation Front (Viet Cong).

North Vietnam also had a sizable military effort in northern Laos, while sponsoring and maintaining an indigenous communist rebellion, the Pathet Lao, to put pressure on the Royal Lao Government.

The U.S. Central Intelligence Agency (CIA), in an effort to disrupt these operations in northern Laos without direct U.S. military involvement, responded by training a guerrilla force of about 30,000 Laotian hill tribesmen known as Special Guerrilla Units (SGUs). Consisting mostly of local Hmong (Meo) tribesmen along with the Mien and Khmu, they were led by Royal Lao Army General Vang Pao, a Hmong military leader. This army, supported by the CIA's proprietary airline Air America, Thailand, the Royal Lao Air Force, and a covert air operation directed by the United States ambassador to Laos, fought the People's Army of Vietnam, the National Liberation Front (NLF), and their Pathet Lao allies to a seesaw stalemate, greatly aiding U.S. interests in the war in Vietnam.

The status of the war in the north throughout the year generally depended on the weather. As the dry season started, in November or December, so did North Vietnamese military operations, as fresh troops and supplies flowed down out of North Vietnam on newly passable routes, either down from Dien Bien Phu, across Phong Saly Province on all-weather highways, or on Route 7 through Ban Ban, Laos on the northeast corner of the Plain of Jars. The CIA's covert operations clandestine army would give way, harrying the PAVN and Pathet Lao as they retreated; Raven Forward Air Controllers would direct massive air strikes against the communists by USAF jets and RLAF T-28s to prevent the capture of the Laotian capitals of Vientiane and Luang Prabang. When the rainy season six months later rendered North Vietnamese supply lines impassable, the Vietnamese communists would recede toward Vietnam.

The war in the southeastern panhandle against the Ho Chi Minh trail was primarily a massive air interdiction program by the USAF and United States Navy because political constraints kept the trail safe from ground assault from South Vietnam. Raven FACs also directed air strikes in the southeast. Other Forward Air Controllers from South Vietnam, such as Covey FACs from the 20th Tactical Air Support Squadron and Nail FACs from the 23rd Tactical Air Support Squadron, also directed strikes. Other air strikes were planned ahead. Overall coordination of the air campaign was directed by an Airborne Command and Control Center, such as those deployed in Operation Igloo White.

The existence of the conflict in Laos was sometimes reported in the U.S., and described in press reports as the CIA's "Secret War in Laos" because details were largely unavailable due to official government denials that the war existed. The denials were seen as necessary considering that the North Vietnamese government and the U.S. had both signed agreements specifying the neutrality of Laos. U.S. involvement was considered necessary because North Vietnam had effectively gained control over a large part of the country. Despite these denials, however, the civil war was the largest U.S. covert operation prior to the Soviet–Afghan War, with areas of Laos controlled by North Vietnam subjected to years of intense U.S. aerial bombardment, representing the heaviest bombing campaign in history. Overshadowing it all was the struggle of the Cold War, with the United States' policy of the containment of communism and the policies of the People's Republic of China and the Soviet Union of spreading communism via subversion and insurgency.

== Chronology of the Laotian Civil War ==
=== 1945: Prelude to war ===
The end of World War II left Laos in political chaos. The French, who had been displaced from their protectorate by the Japanese, wanted to resume control of Laos, and sponsored guerrilla forces to regain control. The Japanese had proclaimed Laos independent even as they lost the war. Though King Sisavang Vong thought Laos was too small for independence, he had proclaimed the end of the French protectorate status while simultaneously favoring the French return. He let it be known he would accept independence if it should occur. Thus there was a nascent movement for independence amid the turmoil.

Underlying all this was a strong undercurrent of Vietnamese involvement. Sixty percent of the population of Laos' six urban areas were Vietnamese, with the Vietnamese holding key positions in the civil bureaucracies and the police. Since the 1930s the Indochinese Communist Party had established wholly Vietnamese cells in Laos.

Prince Phetsarath Ratanavongsa, as Viceroy and Prime Minister, established the Lao royal treasury account with the Indochinese treasury in Hanoi in an attempt to establish a functional economy.

French commandos parachuted into Laos beginning in 1945 to organize guerrilla forces. By November, they had formed the guerrillas into four light infantry battalions of the newly founded French Union Army. The officers and sergeants of the new Lao battalions were French.

In October 1945, a Lao nationalist movement called Lao Issara (Free Laos) was founded as a new government for Laos. Among Lao Issara's prominent members were three European-educated princes; brothers Phetsarath Ratanavongsa and Souvanna Phouma, and their half brother, Souphanouvong. The former became the titular founder of Lao Issara. Souphanouvong became commander in chief, as well as minister of foreign affairs. Souvanna Phouma became minister of public works.

Independence began with an uprising of the Vietnamese residents in Savannakhet. Prince Souphanouvong took command of a band of partisans armed with weapons looted from the local militia. The band moved northward to the administrative capitol of Vientiane with its provisional revolutionary government. Souphanouvong then urged the signing of a military cooperation treaty with the newly established North Vietnamese communist government, which was done. The French military mission was escorted out of Laos into Thailand by a contingent of Chinese troops.

However, the Lao Issara never gained more than a tenuous hold on the entirety of Laos. Roving Viet Minh detachments ruled the northeast, but the Viet Minh declined to aid the new government. Chinese troops, including the Chinese Nationalist 93rd Division, occupied cities as far south as Luang Prabang. The French-sponsored guerrillas controlled the southern provinces of Savannakhet and Khammouan. Prince Boun Oum, who sympathized with the French, occupied the rest of the southern panhandle.

For these, and other reasons, Lao Issara could not hold the country against the returning French colonial government and its troops. The French negotiated a Chinese withdrawal from Laos prior to their own return, removing them from the field.

=== 1946: French return; Vietnamese arrive ===
In January 1946, the French began the reconquest of Laos by sweeping the Bolovens Plateau. They had organized six battalions of light infantry, to which they added a minor force of French troops.

On 21 March 1946, Souphanouvong and his largely Vietnamese force fought the French Union troops at Savannakhet, to no avail; the attackers mustered paratroopers, artillery, armored cars, and Spitfire fighter-bombers. The Lao Issara troops suffered 700 killed. They fled, leaving behind 250 bodies and 150 prisoners.

On 24 April, the French dropped a paratroop battalion on the outskirts of Vientiane, and took the city without resistance. On 9 May, they repeated their airborne tactics with a drop outside Luang Prabang. This was coupled with a thrust to the north by the French forces, from Vientiane to Luang Prabang, that chased Phetsarath Ratanavongsa and the Lao Issara ministers out of Laos. The king reinstated the French rule by repudiating his actions that had been pressured from him by the Japanese, Chinese, and Lao Issara.

By September 1946, the Lao Issara had been defeated and had fled to exile in Bangkok. One of its splinter groups, led by Thao O Anourack, fled to Hanoi. There he allied himself with two men trusted by Ho Chi Minh; Nouhak Phoumsavanh was Vietnamese, and Kaysone Phomvihane was Vietnamese-Lao. These three men founded the military movement that would become the Pathet Lao (Land of Laos).

Thao O Anourack established the initial Pathet Lao base at Con Cuong, Vietnam. Kaysone Phomvihane organized the first detachment of the new force. By the end of 1946, at least 500 Viet Minh agents had crossed into Laos.

=== 1947–1952: Build-up of forces ===
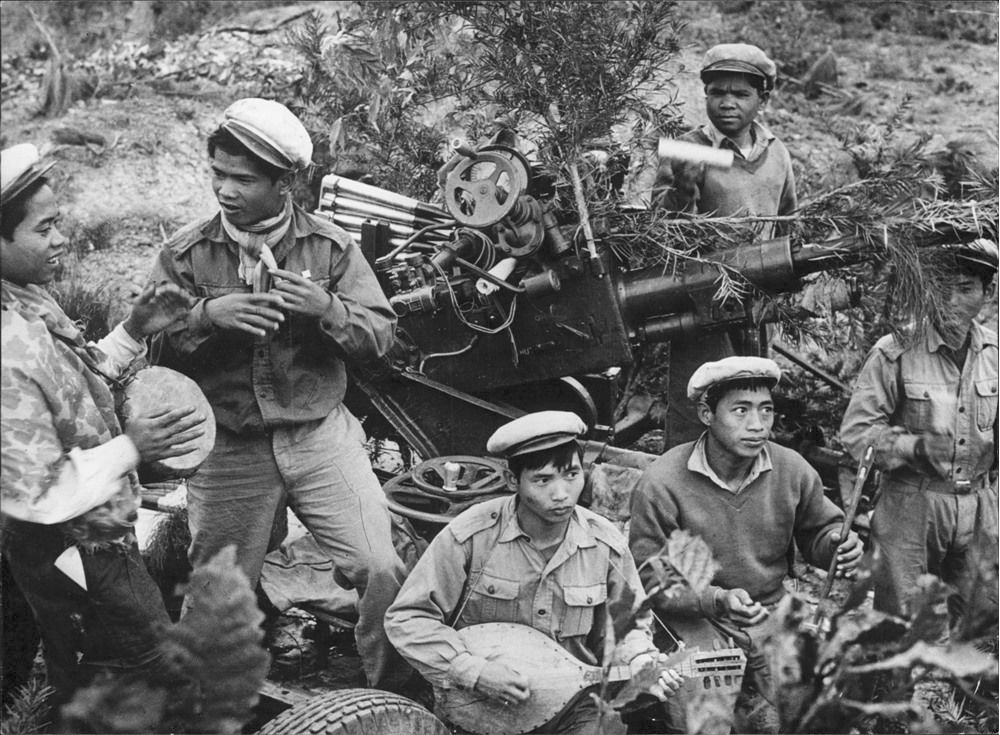
Pathet Lao's Laotian People's Liberation Army (LPLA) Anti-aircraft artillery crew, 1967.

On 11 May 1947, King Sisavang Vong granted a constitution declaring Laos an independent nation within the French Union. This began the building of a new government over the next few years, including the establishment of a national army, the Armée Nationale Laotienne, which was the first iteration of the Royal Lao Army.

The nascent army was plagued by lack of Lao leadership, and its weaponry was a hodgepodge. Thus the new Armée Nationale Laotienne consisted of light infantry battalions officered by the French. There was one paratroop battalion included. The French began training Lao officers and non-commissioned officers even as they continued to lead and train the new army.

In opposition, the Viet Minh raised a subsidiary revolutionary movement, the Pathet Lao, starting with an initial guerrilla band of 25 in January 1949.

In October 1949, the exiled Lao Issara dissolved and the three royal brothers each chose a separate destiny.

Phetsarath Rattanavongsa chose to remain in Bangkok. His stay was temporary. He would once again become the viceroy of Laos.

Souvanna Phouma chose to return to Laos via an amnesty, believing that the Lao would soon free themselves. In 1951 he became Prime Minister for the first time and held that office until 1954.

Souphanouvong, who had spent seven years in Nha Trang during his sixteen years in Vietnam, met Ho Chi Minh and acquired a Vietnamese wife while in Vietnam, and he solicited Viet Minh aid in founding a guerrilla force.

In August 1950, Souphanouvong had joined the Viet Minh in their headquarters north of Hanoi, Vietnam, and become the head of the Pathet Lao, along with its political arm dubbed Neo Lao Hak Sat (Lao Patriotic Front). This was an attempt to give a false front of authority to the Lao communist movement by claiming to represent a united non-partisan effort. Two of its most important founders were members of the Indochinese Communist Party, which advocated overthrow of the monarchy as well as expulsion of the French. This got Laos involved in the First Indochina War, but it started off mainly against the French.

On 23 December 1950, the Pentalateral Mutual Defense Assistance Pact was signed by the United States, France, Vietnam, Cambodia, and Laos; it was a tool to transfer American military aid to the French war effort in Indochina. This year also marked the infiltration of at least 5,000 more Viet Minh into Laos.

In February 1951, the Indochinese Communist Party decided to split in three to sponsor war against the French in Cambodia and Laos, along with the war in Vietnam. The new Laotian branch consisted of 2,091 members, but included only 31 Lao.

Also, by 1951, the Pathet Lao had mustered sufficient trained troops to join the Viet Minh in military operations.

By October 1951, the Armée Nationale Laotienne had raised two more battalions of infantry and began training a battalion of paratroops. The ANL ended the year with a strength of 5,091.

By the end of 1952, the Royal Lao Army had grown to include a battalion of troops commanded by Laotian officers, as well as 17 other companies.

=== 1953–1954: First North Vietnamese invasion and French defeat ===
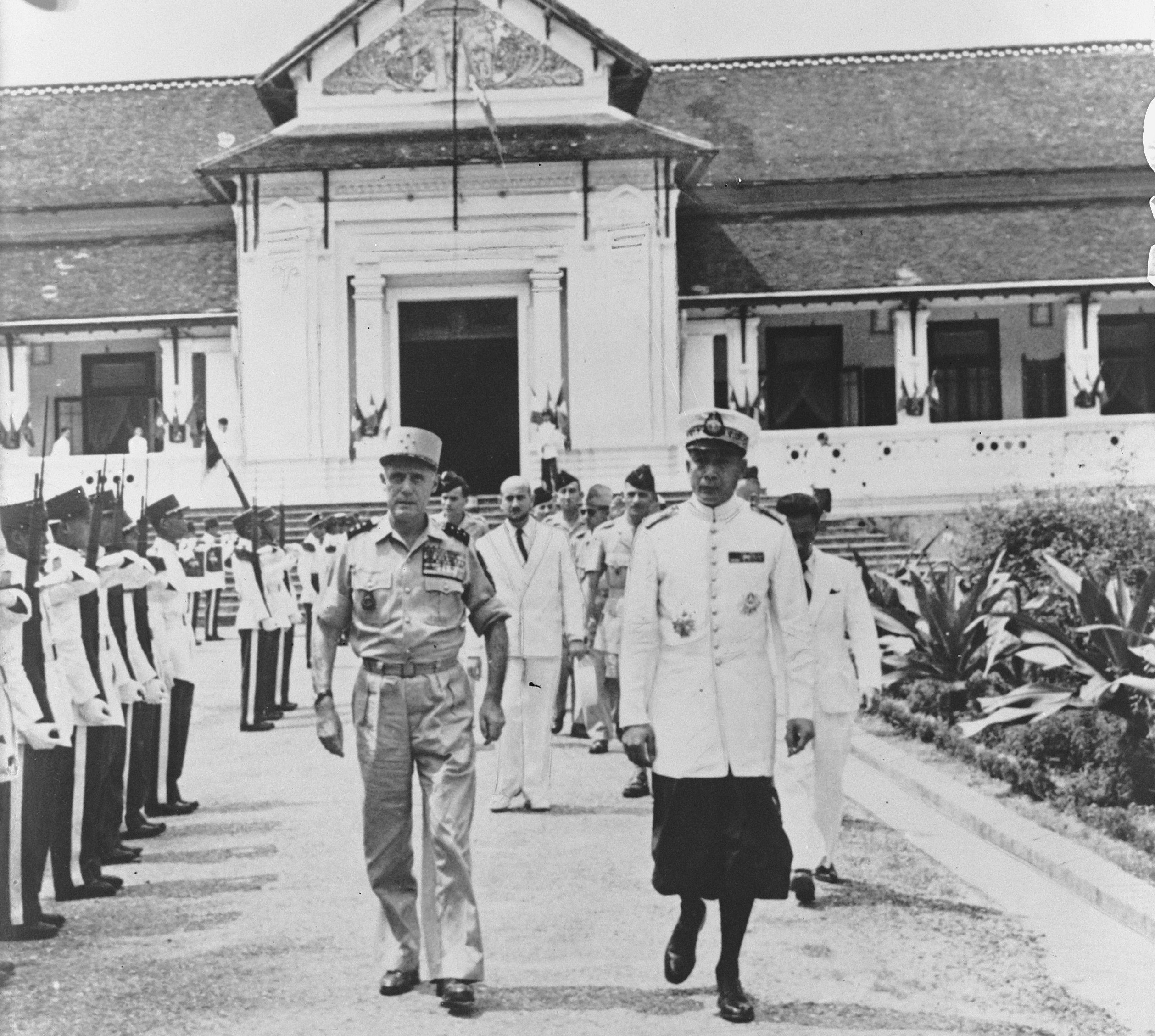
French General Raoul Salan and Lao Prince Sisavang Vatthana inspecting an honour guard of the Laotian Royal Guard outside the Royal Palace in Luang Prabang, 4 May 1953.

In April 1953, the Viet Minh's People's Army of Vietnam (PAVN) invaded the northeastern part of what was still the Kingdom of Laos with 40,000 troops commanded by General Võ Nguyên Giáp; including 2,000 Pathet Lao soldiers led by Souphanouvong. The objective of the two-pronged invasion was the capture of the royal capital of Luang Prabang and of the Plain of Jars. On 9 November the Pathet Lao began its conflict with the Kingdom of Laos, thus beginning the civil war and technically the Second Indochina War while the First Indochina War was still ongoing.

They were opposed by 10,000 Lao troops and 3,000 French regulars.

The North Vietnamese invaders succeeded in conquering the border provinces of Phongsali and Xam Neua, which were adjacent to northern Vietnam and on the northeastern verge of the Plain of Jars. They then moved aside to allow the Pathet Lao force with its mismatched scrounged equipment to occupy the captured ground, and Souphanouvong moved the Pathet Lao headquarters into Xam Neua on 19 April.

The other strike, moving from Điện Biên Phủ and aimed downriver at Luang Prabang, was thwarted by oncoming monsoons and resistance by the French.

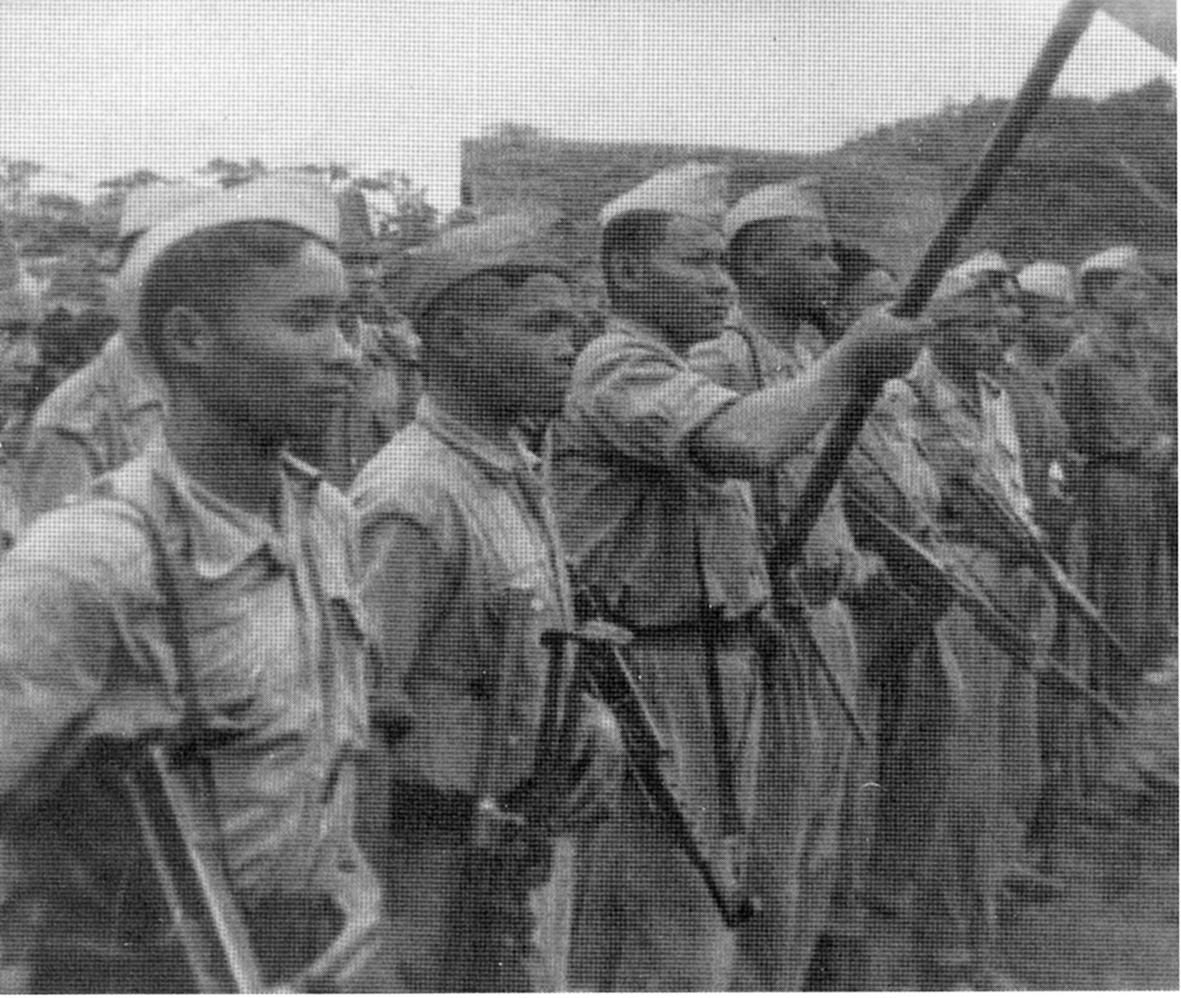
Pathet Lao's LPLA guerrillas assemble at Sam Neua, April 1953.

The Vietnamese invasion was stalled, but only because the French had airlifted in battalions of Foreign Legionnaires and Moroccan Tirailleurs.

In December, the French Union Army, as part of its attempt to protect Laos from the PAVN, recaptured the Dien Bien Phu valley.

In January 1954, the PAVN launched two assaults on Laos. One thrust crossed the top of the panhandle to the Mekong River town of Thakhek. The other was again aimed at Luang Prabang. Both were thwarted in a month.

These were diversions to the famous Battle of Dien Bien Phu, which took place from March through May 1954 within ten kilometers of the Lao border, on the lines of communication into the Plain of Jars. The ruggedness of the karst mountains of northern Laos channels movement into a few canyons; small watercraft could move from Điện Biên Phủ down to the Nam Ou, and thence directly downriver to Luang Prabang, or they cross into the PDJ via Ban Ban.

The United States used Civil Air Transport, which later morphed into Air America, in a covert operation to fly supplies to the embattled French in Điện Biên Phủ. The PAVN also launched a diversionary thrust at Seno, Laos aimed at cutting away the panhandle from the main body of Laos. This thrust was foiled by paratroopers from the French Union's Army of the Republic of Vietnam.

When the relief troops failed to lift the siege in time, the French and their local allies lost the bastion of Điện Biên Phủ. One of the troopers in the relief column marching from Luang Prabang was a young Hmong named Vang Pao.

The French loss at Điện Biên Phủ marked the end of the First Indochina War; the French were driven to negotiate for peace. On 20 July, the Agreement on the Cessation of Hostilities in Laos was signed, ending French rule. Two months later, the North Vietnamese established a support group for Pathet Lao forces at Ban Nameo, well within northeastern Laos.

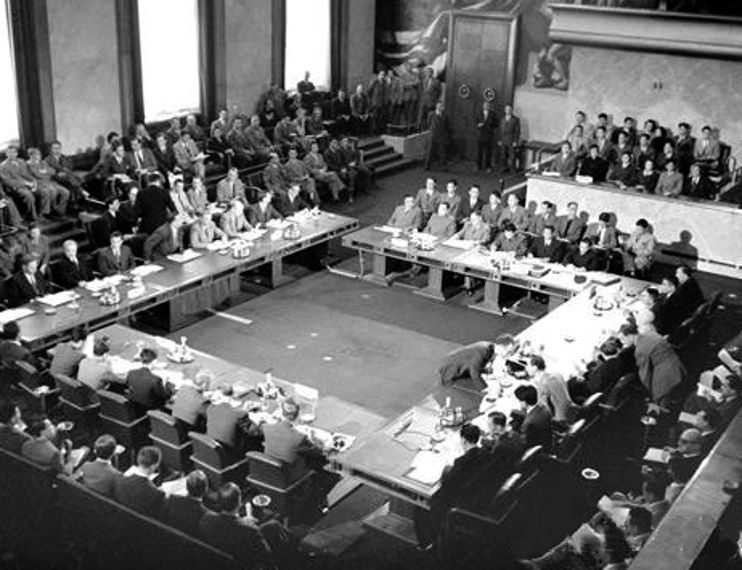
The Geneva Conference of 1954

The Agreement radically changed the geography of Indochina, resulting in independence for Laos. On 1 August 1954 the French army withdrew from Laos declaring independence for the nation alongside North Vietnam, South Vietnam and Cambodia which ended the First Indochina War but the Laotian Civil War was still ongoing. The northern half of Vietnam became independent of the French imperialist enterprise and was ruled by an independent Vietnamese Communist government. Lao French Union troops joined the military of independent Laos, however France kept two military bases in Laos and maintained its "military advisors" in the new Lao military. The Royal Lao government military also received its first aircraft from the French in 1954; nine Morane-Saulnier MS-500 Criquets were supplied for support and medevac.

=== 1955–1958: The lull ===
In January, 1955, French advisors began training the first Lao aviation force. Later that year, Thailand would supply Sikorsky H-19 helicopters and volunteer pilots to the Lao military. The Thais also trained thirty Lao officers in weapons use at Hua Hin, Thailand.

In early 1955, a United States Operation Mission was set up in Laos. Its primary purpose was supply of military defense materials to the Royal Lao Government; 80% of its budget was dedicated to this purpose. The United States paid 100% of the Lao military budget. However, the embassy staff was not up to monitoring this program. There was an obvious need for a Military Assistance Advisory Group; however, the United States had signed a treaty that expressly forbade such.

U.S. President Dwight D. Eisenhower's solution was to establish the Programs Evaluation Office (PEO) in December, 1955, staffed by American civilians with prior military experience and headed up by retired Brigadier General Rothwell Brown. These civilians were given U.S. State Department status. However, they did not work strictly for the State Department. On military matters, they reported to the Commander in Chief Pacific Command, with information supplied to the American ambassador; on non-military matters, they reported directly to the ambassador.

1955 was also notable for the despatch of Royal Lao Government troops to Sam Neua and Phong Saly, which was much resented by the Pathet Lao. As a result of this resentment, and disputes about electoral procedures, the Laotian communists boycotted that year's national elections.

On 21 March 1956, Souvanna Phouma began his second term as prime minister. He opened a dialogue with his brother, Souphanouvong. In August, they announced the intention of declaring a ceasefire and reintegrating the Pathet Lao and their occupied territory into the government. However, the Pathet Lao claimed the right to administer the provinces they occupied.

At the same time, they and their North Vietnamese backers ran a massive recruitment campaign, with the aim of forming nine battalions of troops. Many of the new recruits were sent into North Vietnam for schooling and training. This led to United States concern that the Royal Lao Army would be inadequately equipped and trained because there was only one small French military mission working with the RLA.

In February, 1957, the PEO personnel began supplying training materials to the French Military Mission that was charged with training the Royal Lao Army. The rationale was that improved training would better fit the army with defending its country. As part of this process, the United States even took over paying the Royal Lao Army's salaries.

Beginning in March, 1957, the Royal Lao Army began shuttling arms to Hmong guerrillas, to enable them to fight on the side of the RLA.

In November, 1957, a coalition government incorporating the Pathet Lao was finally established. Using the slogan, "one vote to the right, one vote to the left to prevent civil war", pro-communist parties received one-third of the popular vote and won 13 of 21 contested seats in the elections of 4 May 1958. With these additional seats, the left controlled a total of 16 seats in the 59 member National Assembly. Combined with independents, this was enough to deny Souvanna's center right, neutralist coalition the two-thirds majority it needed to form a government. With parliament deadlocked, the U.S. suspended aid in June to force a devaluation of the overpriced currency, which was leading to the abuse of U.S. aid. In July the government requested that the ICSC for Laos be adjourned, to which the Chief Commissioner consented. The National Assembly responded to the withdrawal of aid by confirming a right-wing government led by Phuy Xananikôn in August. This government included four members of the U.S.-backed Committee for the Defence of the National Interest (none of them National Assembly members). Three more unelected CDNI members were added in December, when Phuy received emergency powers to govern without the National Assembly.

In November 1958, Brigadier General John A. Heintges reviewed the PEO. He promptly replaced General Brown and forged a new agreement with the Lao and the French. Integral to the new agreement was the displacement of the French military trainers by Americans. As a result, PEO expanded over twentyfold. Included in the expansion were 149 Special Forces on temporary duty, and 103 Filipino military veterans working for a newly formed front company named Eastern Construction Company in Laos.

=== 1959: Second North Vietnamese invasion ===
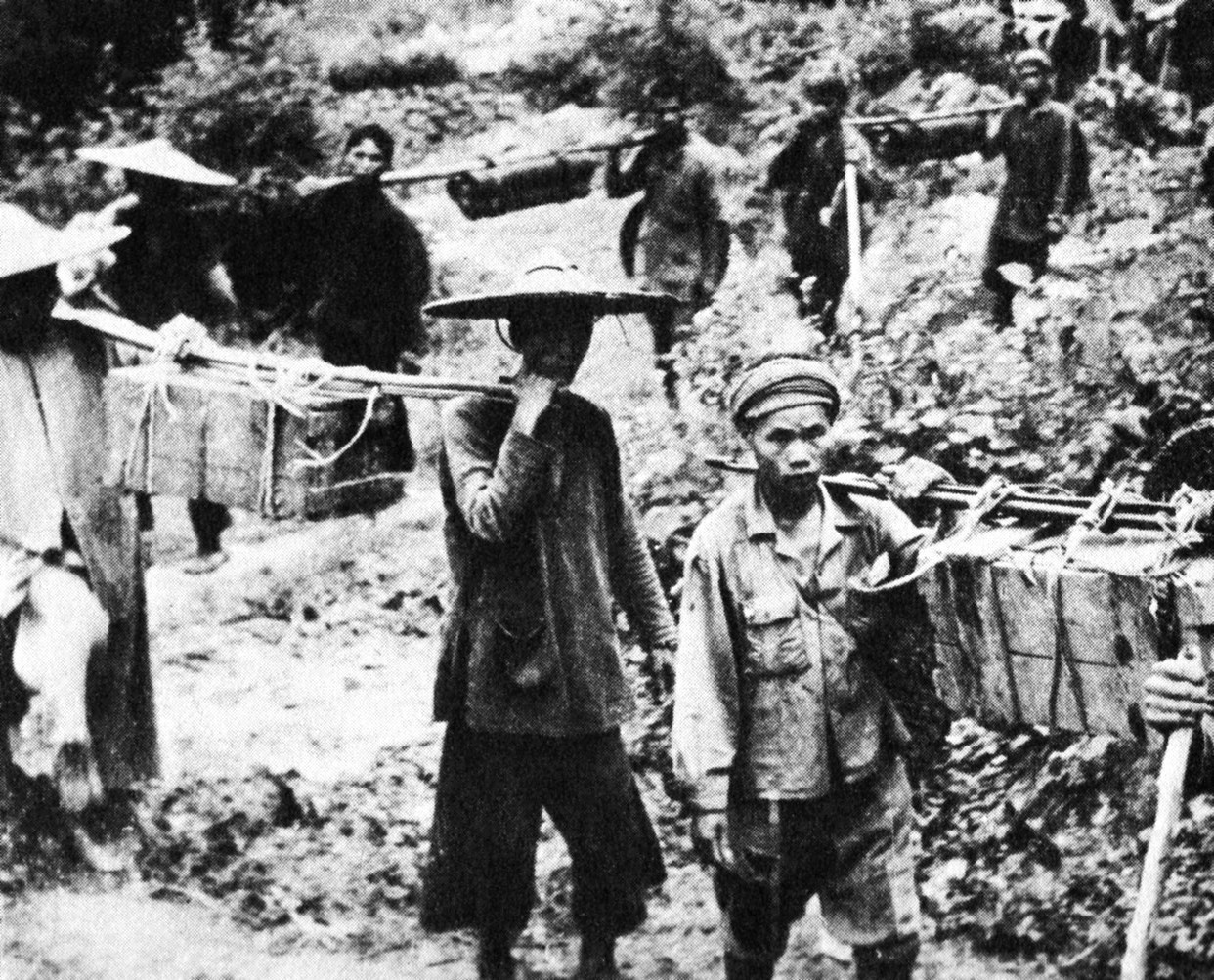
The Ho Chi Minh trail was used by both the North Vietnamese military and Laotian people from the very beginning. Captured North Vietnamese photo, c.1959.

On 15 May 1959, the PAVN established Group 559; this unit was charged with the logistics of moving the necessities of war from North Vietnam to the South. Its foremost feat was building and maintaining the Ho Chi Minh trail down the eastern spine of Laos. Eventually, this transportation network would power the Vietnamese communists to victory. It would have to survive a relentless air campaign comparable to any interdiction bombing in World War II.

According to assistant secretary of state Roger Hilsman, if the communist Pathet Lao regular forces assisted by medium sized NVA forces successfully overthrew the Kingdom of Laos government before the mid-1960s, then other SE Asian nations feared the massive revolutionary communists expansions from town to town, envisioning the domino effect.

Also in May, the long-awaited integration of 1,500 Pathet Lao troops into the national army was scheduled. The U.S. embassy told the Lao government that it would be difficult to gain congressional approval of aid to Laos with communists serving in the army. The Pathet Lao stalled.

The North Vietnamese government (Hanoi) deployed about 30,000-40,000 NVA soldiers to penetrate northern Laos to assist the battalions of Pathet Laos forces beyond major military campaigns.

Under orders from Souphanouvong, the Pathet Lao battalions refused to be integrated into the Royal Lao Army. Souphanouvong was then arrested and imprisoned, along with his aides. The two Pathet Lao battalions, one after the other, escaped during the night with no shots fired, taking their equipment, families, and domestic animals with them. On 23 May, Souphanouvong and his companions also escaped unscathed.

In July, U.S. Special Forces Mobile Training Teams from the 77th Special Forces Group, working under the code name Hotfoot, began training the Royal Laotian army. The Green Berets were attached to the Programs Evaluation Office, and like other PEO employees, were nominal civilians and dressed as such.

The RLA was being formed into Groupement Mobiles – regimental-sized units of three battalions. The training teams were assigned one per GM, with some battalions also meriting a team.

On 28 July, PAVN units attacked all along the North Vietnamese-Lao border. As they took ground from the Royal Lao Army, they moved in Pathet Lao as occupation troops. Poor battle performance by the RLA seemed to verify the need for further training; the RLA outnumbered the attackers, but still lost ground.

Also in July, the American embassy began to contract for aerial resupply for RLA troops, hiring Robert "Dutch" Brongersma and his Beech 18.

In September, Group 100 was succeeded by Group 959; the North Vietnamese were upgrading their military mission to the Pathet Lao, just as the Americans had expanded PEO. Both sides were raising larger client armies, in hopes the Lao would fight.

=== 1960: Neutralist coup ===
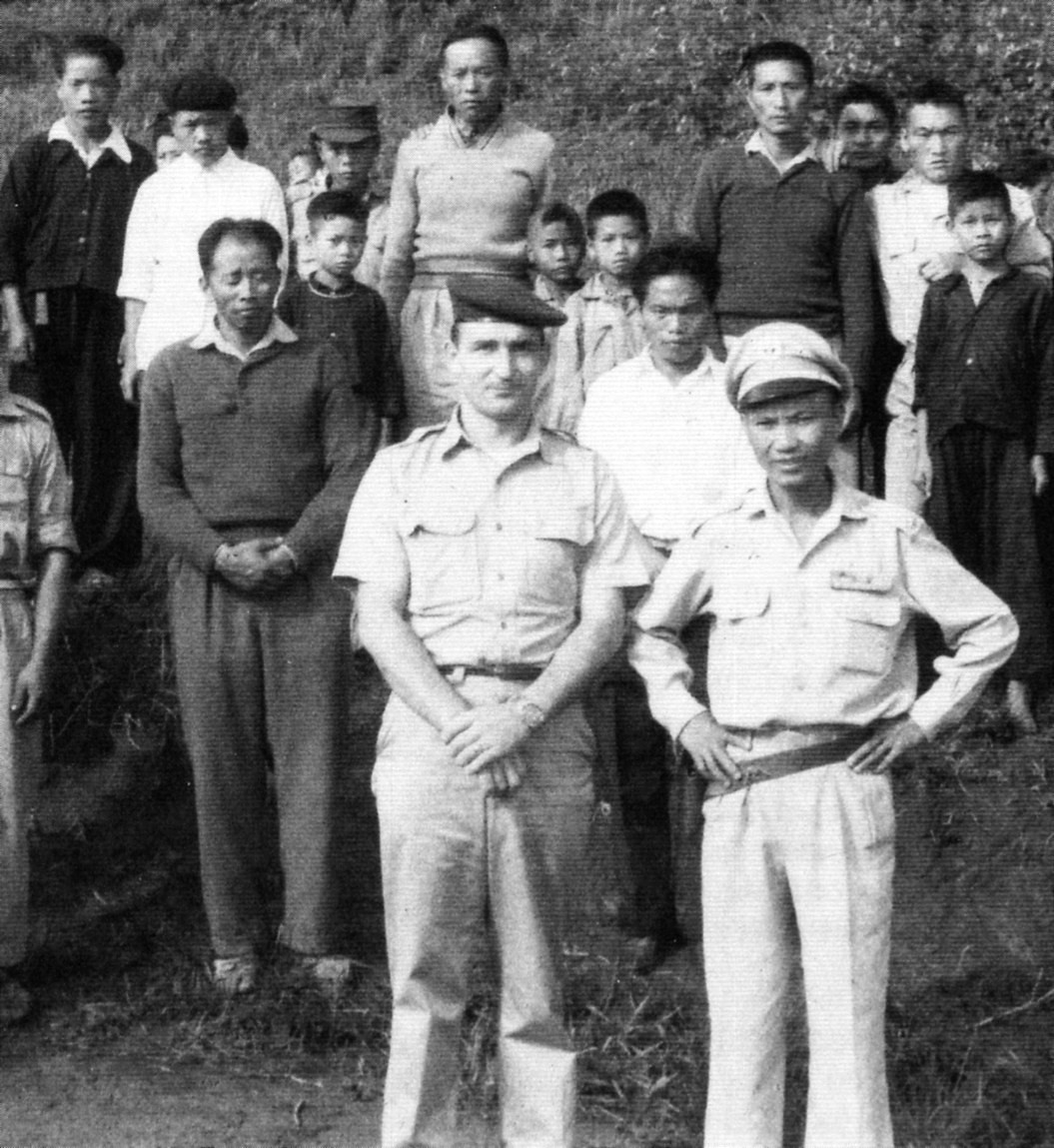
PEO adviser Jack F. Mathews with then Major Vang Pao, commander of the 10éme Bataillon de Infanterie (10 BI), at Nong Net, Laos, July 1960.

On 9 August 1960, Captain Kong Le and his Special Forces-trained Neutralist paratrooper battalion were able to seize control of the administrative capital of Vientiane in a virtually bloodless coup, while Prime Minister Tiao Samsanith, government officials, and military leaders met in Luang Prabang. His stated aim for the coup was an end to fighting in Laos, the end of foreign interference in his country, an end to the consequent corruption caused by foreign aid, and better treatment for his soldiers. However, Kong Le's coup did not end opposition to him, and there was a scramble among unit commanders to choose sides. If one was not pro-coup, then he had the further decision to make as to whom he would back to counter the coup. The front runner was General Phoumi Nosavan, first cousins with the prime minister of Thailand, Field Marshal Sarit Thanarat.

With CIA support, Field Marshal Sarit set up a covert Thai military advisory group, called Kaw Taw. Kaw Taw supported a counter-coup against the new Neutralist Lao government in Vientiane, supplying artillery, artillerymen, and advisers to Phoumi's forces. It also committed the CIA-sponsored Police Aerial Reinforcement Unit (PARU) to operations within Laos.

Alongside its covert Kaw Taw operation, immediately after Kong Le's coup the government of Thailand began an embargo via land blockade, cutting off the main source of imported goods for Vientiane. The United States Secretary of State, Christian Herter, stated that the United States supported the "legitimate government under the King's direction." The United States supported the pro-Western government of Prime Minister Tiao Samsanith while at the same time the CIA supported the covert counter-coup effort organized by Sarit against the Neutralist government in Vientiane.

The Neutralist forces in Vientiane organized the executive committee of the High Command of the Revolution as the interim government in Laos the following day. General Phoumi Nosavan, stated on 10 August that he planned to retake Vientiane by force. The United States Ambassador to Laos, Winthrop G. Brown, responded to General Phoumi by stating that the United States supported a restoration of peace "through quick and decisive action."

PEO had turned its support to General Phoumi. With the help of Air America and covert aid from Thailand, the general and his troops moved north toward Vientiane from Savannakhet in southern Laos, in November.

The Soviet Union began a military air bridge into Vientiane in early December; it was characterized as the largest Soviet airlift since World War II. This air bridge flew in PAVN artillery and gunners to reinforce the Neutralist/Pathet Lao coalition.

On their side, the United States flew four B-26 Invader bombers from Taiwan into Takhli Royal Thai Air Force Base, poised to strike into Laos. They were later joined by an additional eight B26s. With a dozen guns, half a dozen rockets, and a napalm canister apiece, they were a potent threat, but were never used.

On 13 December, Phoumi's army began a three-day bombardment of Vientiane. Five hundred civilians and seventeen of Kong Le's paratroopers were killed by the shellfire. On the 14th, a U.S. carrier task force went on alert, and the Second Airborne Brigade stood by to seize selected Laotian airfields. The U.S. was poised to rescue its paramilitary and diplomatic advisers in Laos.

Kong Le and his Neutralists finally withdrew northward to the Plain of Jars. Their withdrawal was covered by artillery fire from the PAVN 105 mm howitzers rushed in from Hanoi, and supported by Soviet airdrops of crucial supplies of rations, munitions, and radios. In the retreat, Kong Le picked up 400 recruits, swelling his force to 1,200 men.

Phoumi's coup was thus successful, but the result was the alliance of the Neutralists with the Pathet Lao on 23 December. As 1960 ended, the nation of Laos had become an arena of confrontation for the world's superpowers.

=== 1961: Superpowers' involvement deepens ===
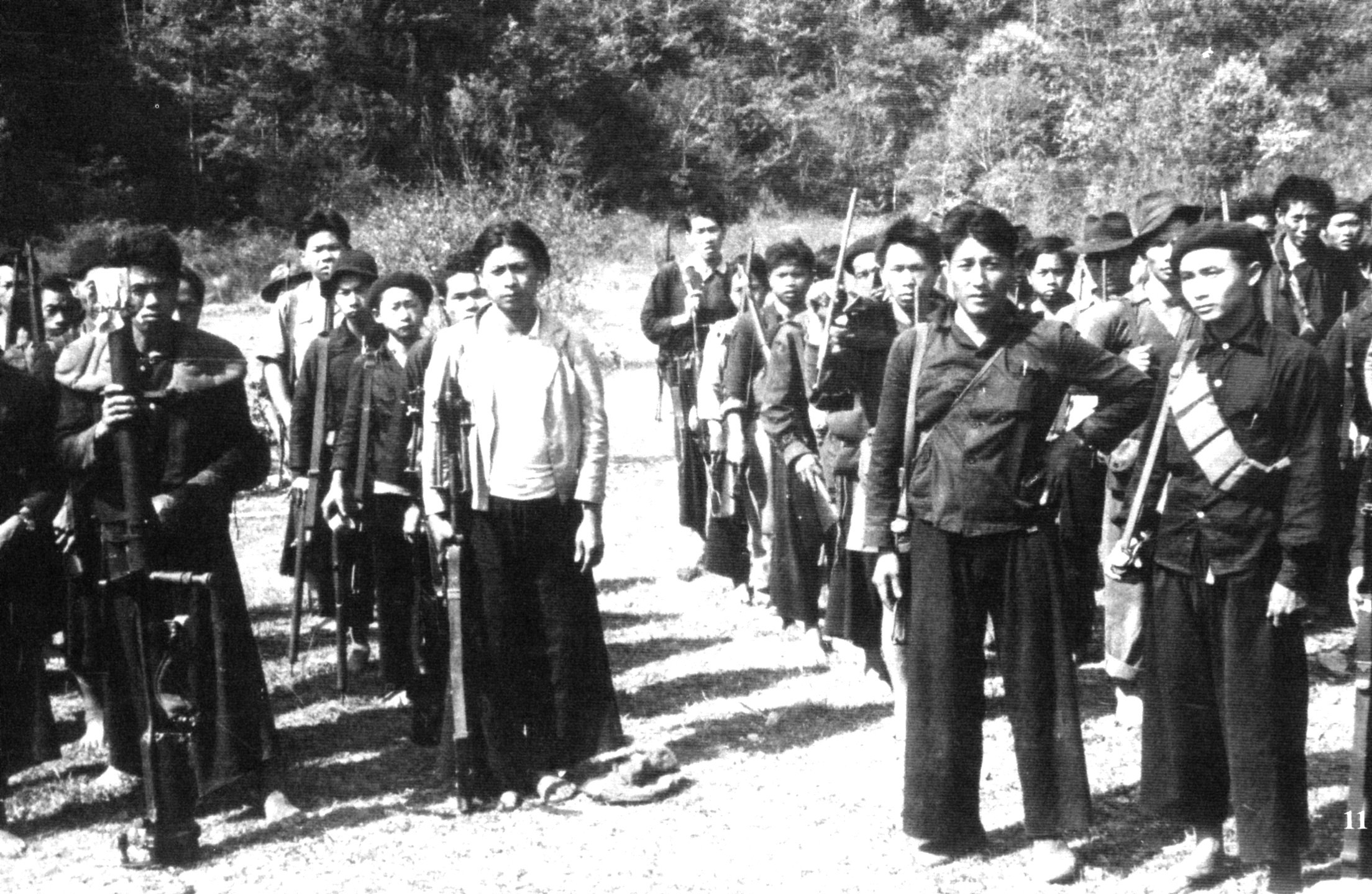
An Auto Defense de Choc (ADC) Hmong guerrilla company assembles at Phou Vieng, Spring 1961.

Beginning on 1 January, a new coalition of Kong Le's Neutralists, Pathet Lao, and PAVN drove 9,000 Royal Lao Army troops from the Plain of Jars.

On 3 January, the Royal Laotian Air Force (RLAF) received its first counter-insurgency aircraft, American-built T-6 Texans, via the Royal Thai Air Force (RTAF). These four reconfigured trainers were armed with two .30 caliber machine guns and five-inch rockets, and could carry 100-pound bombs. Four previously trained Lao pilots undertook transition training in Thailand; on 9 January, the pilots flew the new RLAF fighter-bombers to Vientiane. Two days later, they flew their first combat sorties, against PAVN and Pathet Lao covering Kong Le's retreat into the Plain of Jars.

Russian Soviet air supply continued, bringing in heavy weapons to supplement the light arms previously delivered. On 7 January, the North Vietnamese presence was escalated by an additional four battalions; two of the battalions immediately moved to the point of conflict, on Route 7, which connected to Vientiane. A third PAVN battalion moved into action at Tha Thom, south of the Plain of Jars. On 15 January, the entire 925th Independent Brigade of the PAVN had crossed into Laos to reinforce the Pathet Lao/Neutralist coalition.

The U.S. decided to counter-escalate by airdropping arms to a force of 7,000 Hmong guerrillas later in the month. The U.S. Navy transferred four H-34 helicopters to Air America.

By the beginning of February 1961, the first four Thai pilots arrived to fly four more T-6s supplied to the Royal Laotian Air Force (RLAF). The Thai pilots had been officially discharged from the Royal Thai Air Force (RTAF) and held no official position in the RLAF. The growth of the RLAF would be nullified by its casualties, as five of the T-6s were lost in action by the end of March.

An inter-agency task force set up by the incoming Kennedy administration in early February undertook a two-month study of possible American responses to the Laotian civil war. Even as the French ended their training mission, American training efforts were ramped up: Sixteen H-34 helicopters were transferred from the U.S. Marine Corps to Air America; maintenance facilities were established at Udorn in northern Thailand, about 85 kilometres south of Vientiane. The most drastic alternative the task force envisioned was a 60,000-man commitment of American ground troops in southern Laos, with a possible use of nuclear weapons. These latter options were not elected.

On 9 March, the communists captured the only road junction between Luang Prabang and Vientiane. When RLA troops were ordered to counterattack and retake the junction, they dropped their weapons and ran. Special Forces Team Moon was assigned as advisers to the RLA unit. On 22 April 1961, Team Moon was overrun. Two sergeants were killed, and team leader Captain Walter H. Moon was captured; he was later executed while trying to escape captivity. Another sergeant was released sixteen months later.

The Operation Millpond B-26s had been scheduled to strike at Kong Le, but the strike was stayed by an event on the far side of the world. The Bay of Pigs Invasion failed, and that failure gave pause to U.S. actions in Laos. A ceasefire was sought. Simultaneously, the PEO shed its civilian guise and went above ground to become a Military Advisory Assistance Group. Emblematic of the change, the Hotfoot teams donned their U.S. uniforms and became White Star Mobile Training Teams.

The truce supposedly went into effect the first week of May, but was repeatedly breached by the communists. With the Royal Lao Army ineffective, the Hmong guerrillas were left as the only opposition to the communists. In early June, they were forced from their beleaguered position at the Ban Padong by an artillery barrage followed by a ground assault. Under command of General Vang Pao, they fell back to Long Tieng.

The U.S. Central Intelligence Agency had begun secretly recruiting Lao montagnards into 100-man militia companies. Riflemen trained for these militias would receive eight weeks basic training, then serve several months in their militia. Once they had that experience, which often included their first combat, they were further recruited into battalions of irregular troops called Special Guerrilla Units. The battalions were filled out along ethnic lines, most being Hmong, but some being Yao (Iu-Mien) or Lao Theung (Lao Saetern). SGUs, once formed up, underwent three further months training by Thai officers and sergeants in Phitsanuloke, Thailand.

By summer, the CIA had mustered 9,000 hill tribesmen into the ranks of the Armée Clandestine. It was aided by nine CIA agents, nine Special Forces augmenters, and 99 Thai Special Forces troopers from the Police Aerial Resupply Unit.

By autumn, the future course of American involvement was set. Paramilitary trainers would train guerrilla units, with resupply coming via airdrops, and specialized short takeoff and landing aircraft using makeshift dirt airstrips. Other trainers would try to mold the Royalist regulars into a fighting force. Fighter-bombers would serve as flying artillery to blast the communist forces into retreat or submission.

In December, the Royalists decided to assert control over the provincial capital of Nam Tha, which was on the northwestern border, almost in southern China. Laotian Army Groupement Mobiles (GMs) 11 and 18 were stationed there, and soon came under pressure from the communists.

=== 1962: Disaster and a new government ===
By February, the Royal Lao Government's hold on Nam Tha seemed tenuous enough that it was reinforced by the paratroopers of GM 15. That gave a numerical edge to the defenders and should have guaranteed Nam Tha's retention. The presence of armed American Special Forces advisors should have stiffened them with military expertise. In May, a PAVN assault broke the RLG forces and routed them. The Royalist soldiers fled southward across the entirety of northwestern Laos into Thailand, a retreat of over a hundred miles.

Faced with this fiasco, the U.S. and other foreign powers pressured the RLG into a coalition with the Pathet Lao and Kong Le's Forces Armee Neutrale. The International Agreement on the Neutrality of Laos was signed on July 23, 1962, in Geneva, Switzerland between 14 other governments (including the United States and South Vietnam, who had not signed the agreements of the prior 1954 Geneva Conference). It aimed to end the civil war by committing that the signatories would refrain from direct or indirect interference in the internal affairs and international neutrality of Laos, and that the government of Laos would commit to maintaining national unity. As part of the requirements for all foreign powers to withdraw military operations, the United States removed its Military Assistance Advisory Group in September. However, believing that the Vietnamese communists would not uphold their commitment to withdraw, the Requirements Office was established the same month as a branch of USAID, although it operated primarily as supply and logistics support to the Royal Lao Army and base for CIA operations.

Over this period, several companies of hill tribes irregulars were being sent to Hua Hin, Thailand for training, initially by the CIA and then by Vang Pao after the withdrawal.

=== 1963: Stasis ===
By the middle of the year, the Pathet Lao and Neutralists had begun to squabble with one another. The neutralist group was soon divided between right-leaning neutralists (headed by Kong Le) and left-leaning neutralists (headed by Quinim Polsena and Colonel Deuane Sunnalath). On 12 February 1963 Kong Le's second in command, Colonel Ketsana, was assassinated. Shortly afterwards Quinim Polsena and his deputy were also assassinated. The neutralist camp was split with some going over to the Pathēt Lao. Fighting between the Pathet Lao and government troops soon resumed.

Vang Pao gathered three SGU battalions into Groupement Mobile 21 and spearheaded a drive into Sam Neua against the Pathet Lao. His offensive was resupplied by supplies airdropped by the civilian aircraft of Air America and Bird and Sons.

In the meantime, the United States re-established a Military Assistance Advisory Group to support its efforts in Laos, basing it in Bangkok. The Requirements Office of the U.S. Embassy in Vientiane was staffed by civilians and monitored the need for U.S. military aid to Laos.

In August, the Royal Laotian Air Force received its first four T-28 Trojans that had been adapted for counter-insurgency warfare.

The irregular companies trained the previous year in Thailand were now formed into a battalion called SGU 1. Irregular forces proliferated throughout the country. In Military Regions 3 and 4, action, intelligence, and road watch teams infiltrated the Ho Chi Minh trail.

In December, Vang Pao was promoted to Brigadier General by King Sisavong.

=== 1964–1965: Escalation and U.S. Air Force involvement ===
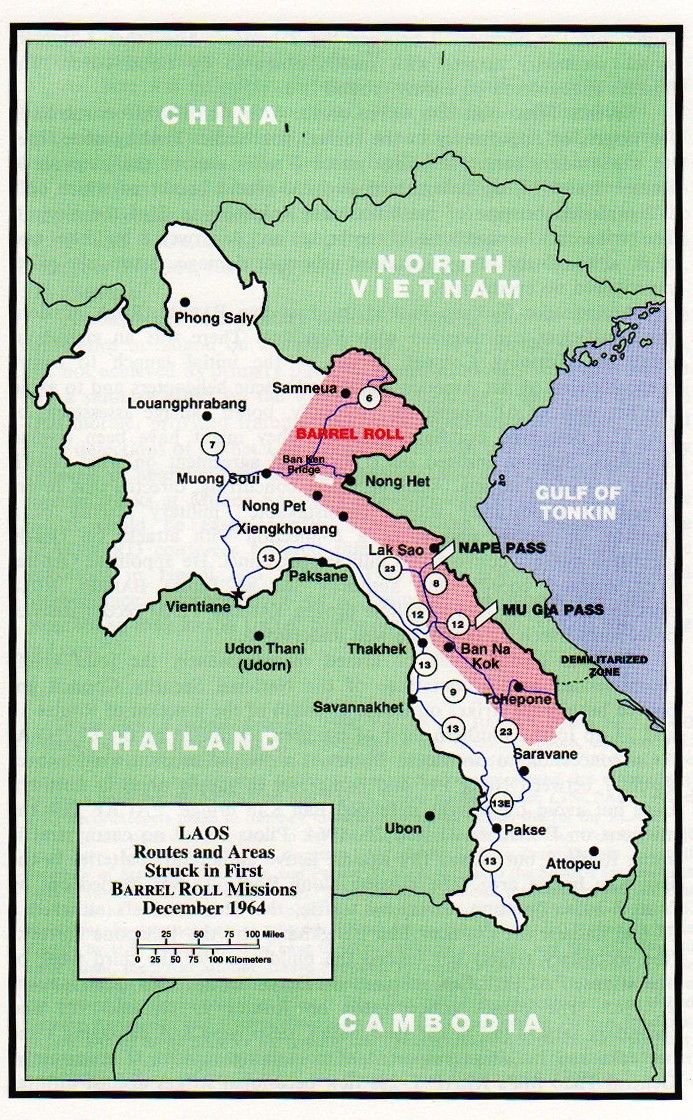
Barrel Roll operational area, 1964

On 1 April, the USAF set up Project Waterpump, which was a pilot training program at Udorn Royal Thai Air Force Base to supply Lao pilots for the Royal Laotian Air Force. The RLAF also began augmenting its ranks with Thai volunteer pilots in 1964.

Run by a 41-man team from Detachment 6 of the 1st Air Commando Wing, this facility was an end run around the treaty obligation that forbade training in Laos. Besides training pilots, Waterpump encouraged cooperation between the RLAF and the Royal Thai Air Force. It was also tasked, as a last resort, to augment the RLAF to counter a renewed Communist offensive in Laos.

In Laos itself, there was an effort to train Laotians as forward air guides. Meantime, the Butterfly forward air control program began.

Even as the air commandos established themselves in Udorn and Laos, several Lao generals attempted a coup in Vientiane. With the capital in turmoil, the Communists on the Plain of Jars attacked and overran the Royalist and Neutralist positions. The United States then released the necessary ordnance for the RLAF to bomb Communist encampments, beginning on 18 May.

On 19 May, the United States Air Force began flying mid and low-level missions over the renewed fighting, under the code name Yankee Team. They also began reconnaissance missions over the Laotian panhandle to obtain target information on men and material being moved into South Vietnam over the Ho Chi Minh trail. By this time, the footpaths on the trail had been enlarged to truck roads, with smaller paths for bicycles and walking. The Trail had become the major artery for use by North Vietnam to infiltrate South Vietnam.

On 9 June, U.S. President Lyndon B. Johnson ordered an F-100 strike against the enemy in retaliation for the shoot down of another U.S. aircraft.

The summer of 1964 was marked by a successful attack by the Forces Armee Royale. Operation Triangle cleared one of the few roads in Laos; Route 13 connected the administrative capitol of Vientiane with the royal capitol of Luang Prabang.

The Plain of Jars activities expanded by December 1964, were named Operation Barrel Roll, and were under the control of the U.S. ambassador to Laos, who approved all targets before they were attacked.

==== Operations Steel Tiger and Tiger Hound ====
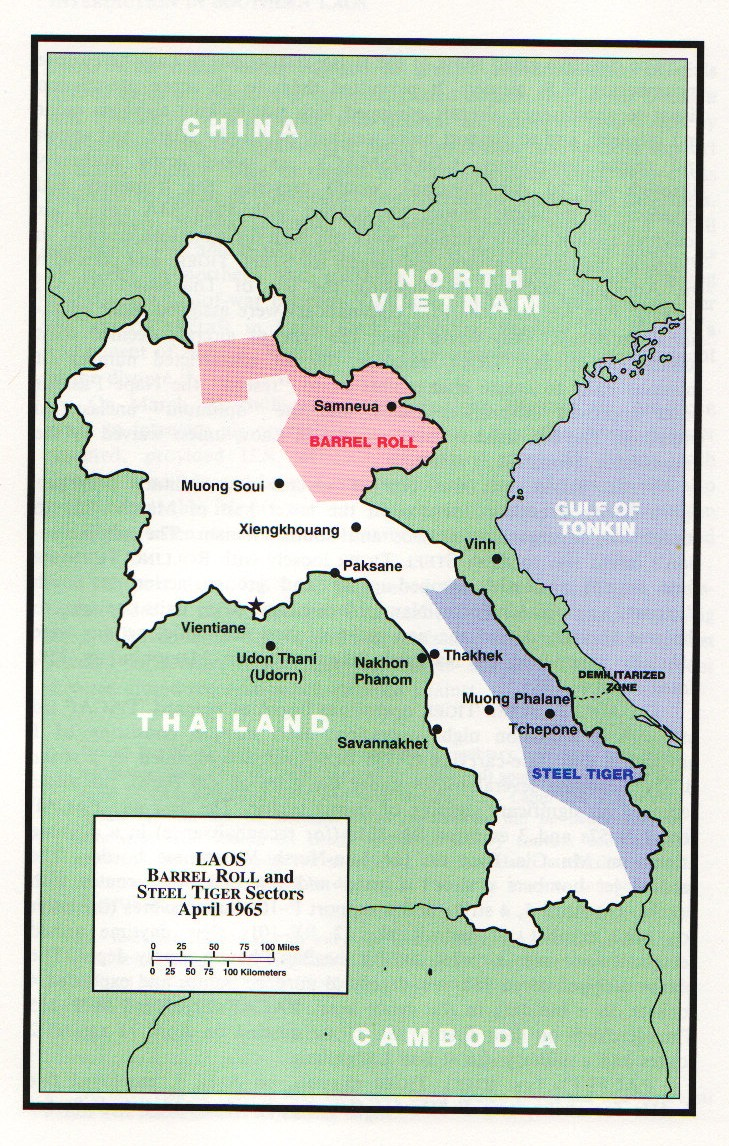
Barrel Roll and Steel Tiger operational area, 1965

1965 began with an event that showed how the commanding generals of the five military regions of Laos were essentially warlords of their own domains.

In February, Commanding General of Military Region 5 Kouprasith Abhay mounted a coup against the group of generals who had attempted a coup the previous year. Among the losers fleeing into exile were General Phoumi Nosavan.

On 3 April, the U.S. began Operation Steel Tiger over the Laotian panhandle and the Vietnamese DMZ to locate and destroy enemy forces and materiel being moved southward at night on the Ho Chi Minh trail into South Vietnam. However, since circumstances made it a highly complex matter in regard to the apparent neutrality of Laos, target approval had to come from the U.S. government in Washington, D.C.. Additionally, the U.S. ambassadors in South Vietnam, Laos, and Thailand were involved in controlling these U.S. air operations.

Late in 1965, the communists greatly increased their infiltration along the Ho Chi Minh trail. The United States decided to concentrate airpower upon a small segment of the Trail closest to South Vietnam and used most extensively by the enemy. As a result, Operation Tiger Hound was initiated in December 1965, utilizing aircraft from the Air Force, the United States Navy and U.S. Marines, the Vietnamese Air Force, and the Royal Laotian Air Force. On 11 December, B-52 heavy bombers were called in to this tactical operation, in their first use over Laos.

From 1965 to 1973, the civil war moved back and forth in northern Laos, characterized by short but often very intense engagements.

=== 1966–1967 ===
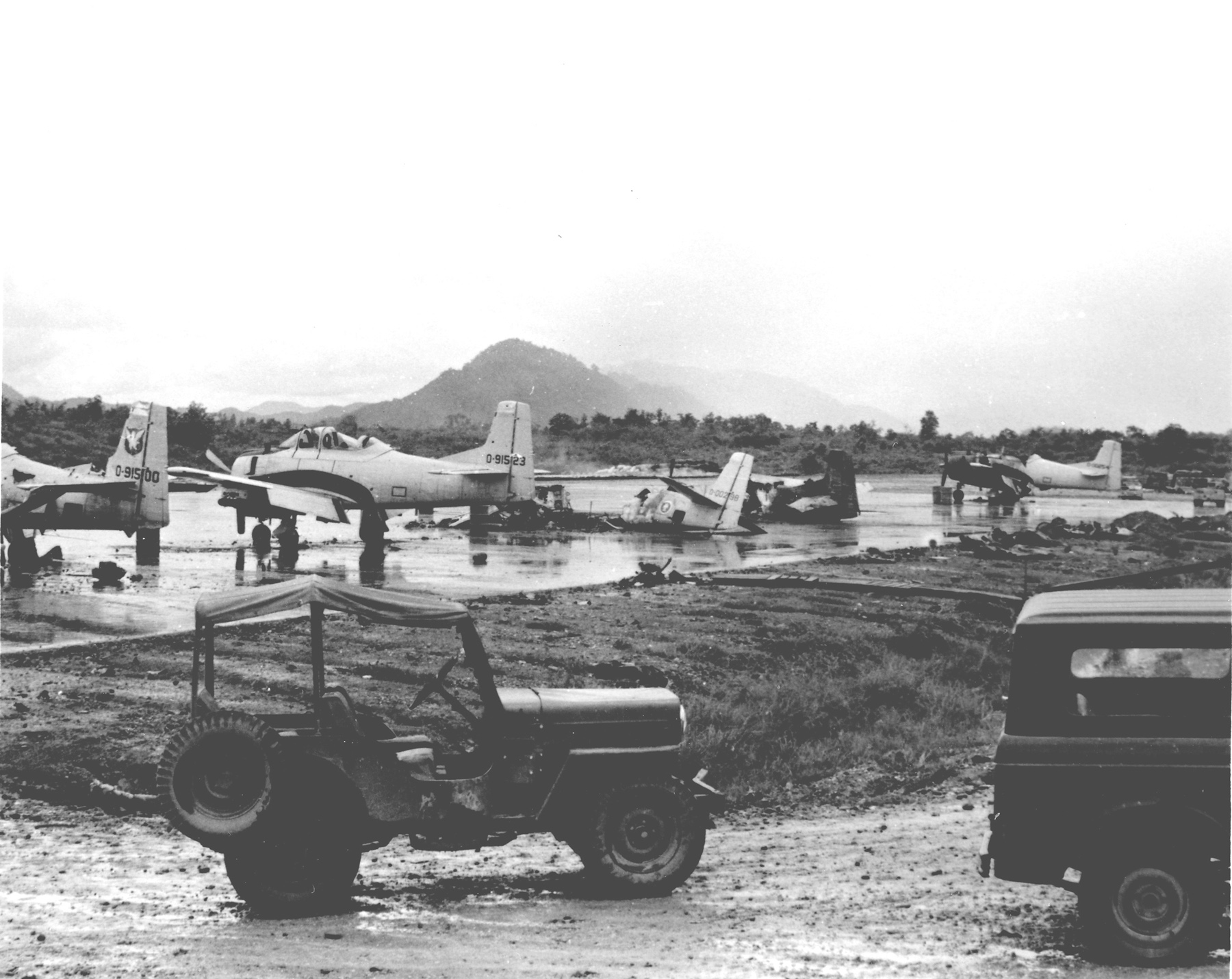
Damage caused by a communist ground attack on Luang Prabang airfield, 1967.

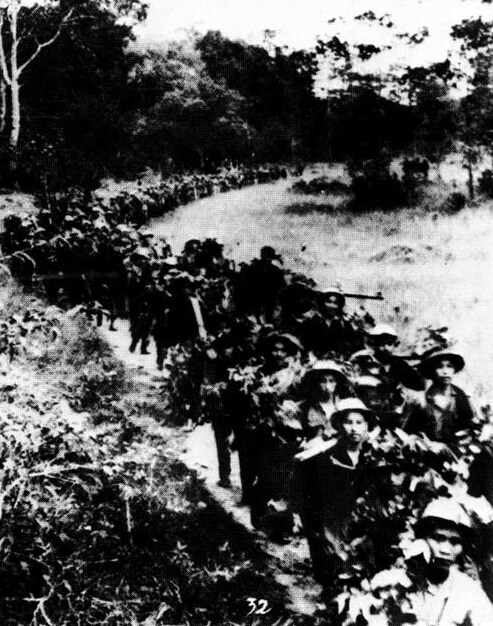
North Vietnamese troops march through the Ho Chi Minh trail in southern Laos, 1967.

In the far northwest, Team Fox, an intelligence team of Mien hill tribesmen began long range reconnaissance of southern China.

In July, RLG forces seized the Nam Bac Valley. Three Infantry Regiments, one independent infantry battalion, and one artillery battalion took Nam Bac and established a defensive line north of Luang Prabang.

On the Plain of Jars, the Pathet Lao advance gradually slowed due to the destruction of its supplies by airpower, and Laotian troops then counter-attacked. By August 1966, they had advanced to within 45 miles of the DRV border. North Vietnam then sent thousands of its regular troops into the battle and once again the Laotians were forced to retreat.

Steel Tiger operations continued down the length of the panhandle in 1966, with special emphasis upon the Tiger Hound area. Since most of the communist truck traffic was at night, the Air Force developed and began using special equipment to detect the nighttime traffic.

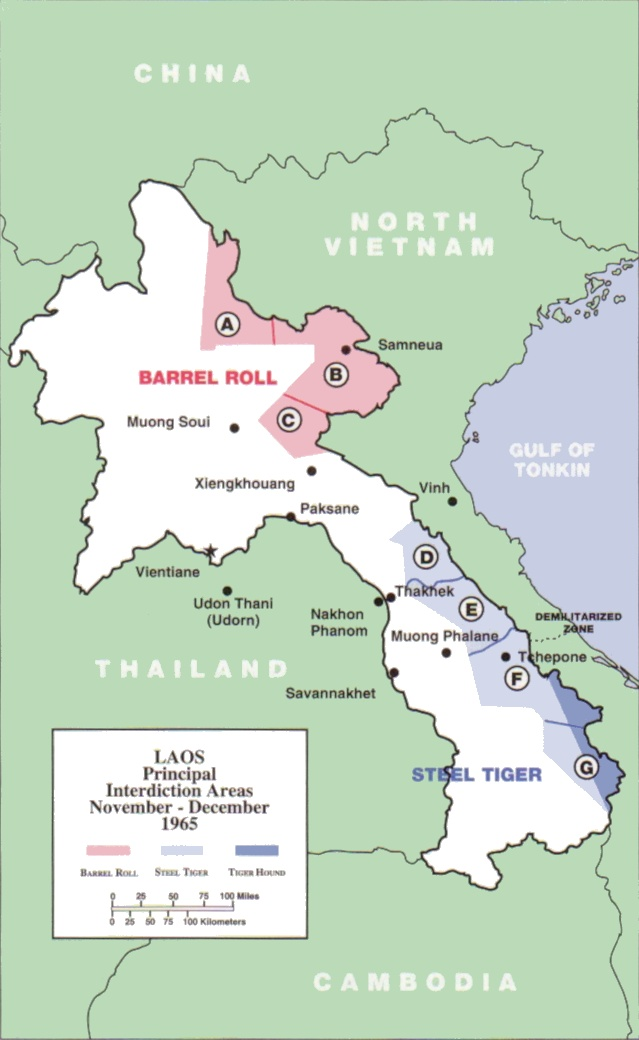
Barrel Roll, Steel Tiger and Tiger Hound operational areas.

In eastern Laos, U.S., Royal Laotian, and VNAF aircraft continued their attacks on traffic along the Ho Chi Minh trail. During 1967, B-52s flew 1,718 sorties in this area, almost triple their 1966 record. The major targets were trucks which had to be hunted down and destroyed one-by-one. This seemed to be irrational thinking to many Americans flying these combat missions for these trucks could have been destroyed en masse before, during, or after their unloading from the freighters that had hauled them to North Vietnam if bombing of Haiphong had been permitted. The presence of Soviet, British, Greek and Panamanian neutral ships in Haiphong prevented any United States bombing for the duration of the war.

In northern Laos, the Communists continued their slow advance across the Plain of Jars in 1967. Laotian victories were few and far between, and by the end of the year, the situation had become critical even with the air support which had been provided by the Royal Lao Air Force.

Laotian tribal irregulars were operating out of Nam Bac, under CIA direction from Luang Prabang, some 60 miles south of the guerrilla base. In midyear, over the objections of Lao colonels, American advisors pressured Royal Lao troops into forming their smaller units into combat battalions. Despite the poor training of the Lao soldiers, some of whom had never fired a weapon, these raw new units were moved northward out of Luang Prabang over a several month period to garrison Nam Bac. By mid-October, some 4,500 government troops held the valley to secure the air strip for their resupply. The American intent was the establishment of Nam Bac as the keystone of an "iron arc" of defensive positions across northern Laos.

In response, the PAVN 316th Infantry Division was dispatched to Laos to assault Nam Bac. The Royalist garrison was soon surrounded. They had American-supplied 105 mm howitzers for artillery support. They could also call on Royal Lao Air Force T-28s for close air support. U.S. Air Force fighter-bombers struck the Communist supply lines. Communist gunfire closed the Nam Bac airstrip to fixed wing resupply. Air America copters flew in supplies and evacuated the wounded; American C-123s parachuted supplies ferried from Udorn RTAFB to the beleaguered government troops. The Royalist troops would not launch a clearing attack to regain use of the runway for resupply. On 25 December, a Vietnamese artillery barrage kicked off their offensive.

=== 1968: Royal Lao Army neutralized ===
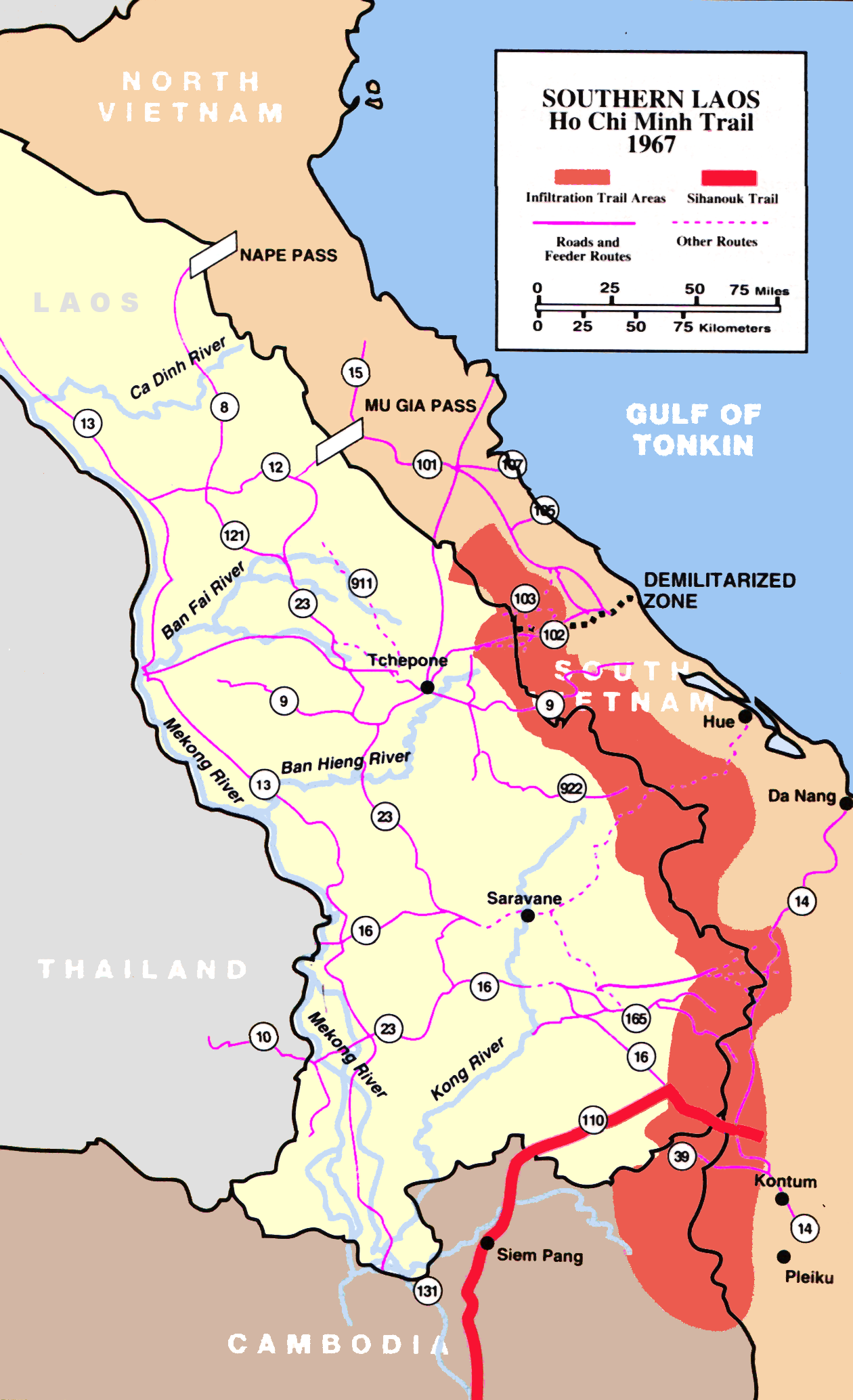
A map of the Ho Chi Minh trail, 1967

On 13 January the North Vietnamese launched a multi-division attack on the Royal Lao Army at Nam Bac, Laos. Some of the government troops began withdrawing from the valley. After about a third of the defenders had retreated, the final assault on the Royalist garrison came out of a heavy mist and hit the Royalist command post. Its communications with the defenders was cut; the rout was on. The heavy weapons and scale of the PAVN attack could not be matched by the national army and it was effectively sidelined for several years.

Most of the government soldiers scattered into the surrounding hills; about 200 of the defenders were killed in action. Of the 3,278 Royalist soldiers, only about a third returned to government service. The Royalists had suffered such a staggering defeat that their army never recovered; the government was left with only tribal irregulars using guerrilla tactics fighting on its side.

Throughout 1968, the communists slowly advanced across the northern part of Laos, defeating Laotian forces time and time again. An important U.S. navigation aids site fell in the Battle of Lima Site 85 on 10 March 1968. This success was achieved despite U.S. military advice and assistance. In November, the U.S. launched an air campaign against the Ho Chi Minh trail because North Vietnam was sending more troops and supplies than ever along this route to South Vietnam. This new operation, named Operation Commando Hunt, continued until 1972, with little success.

=== 1969–1972 ===
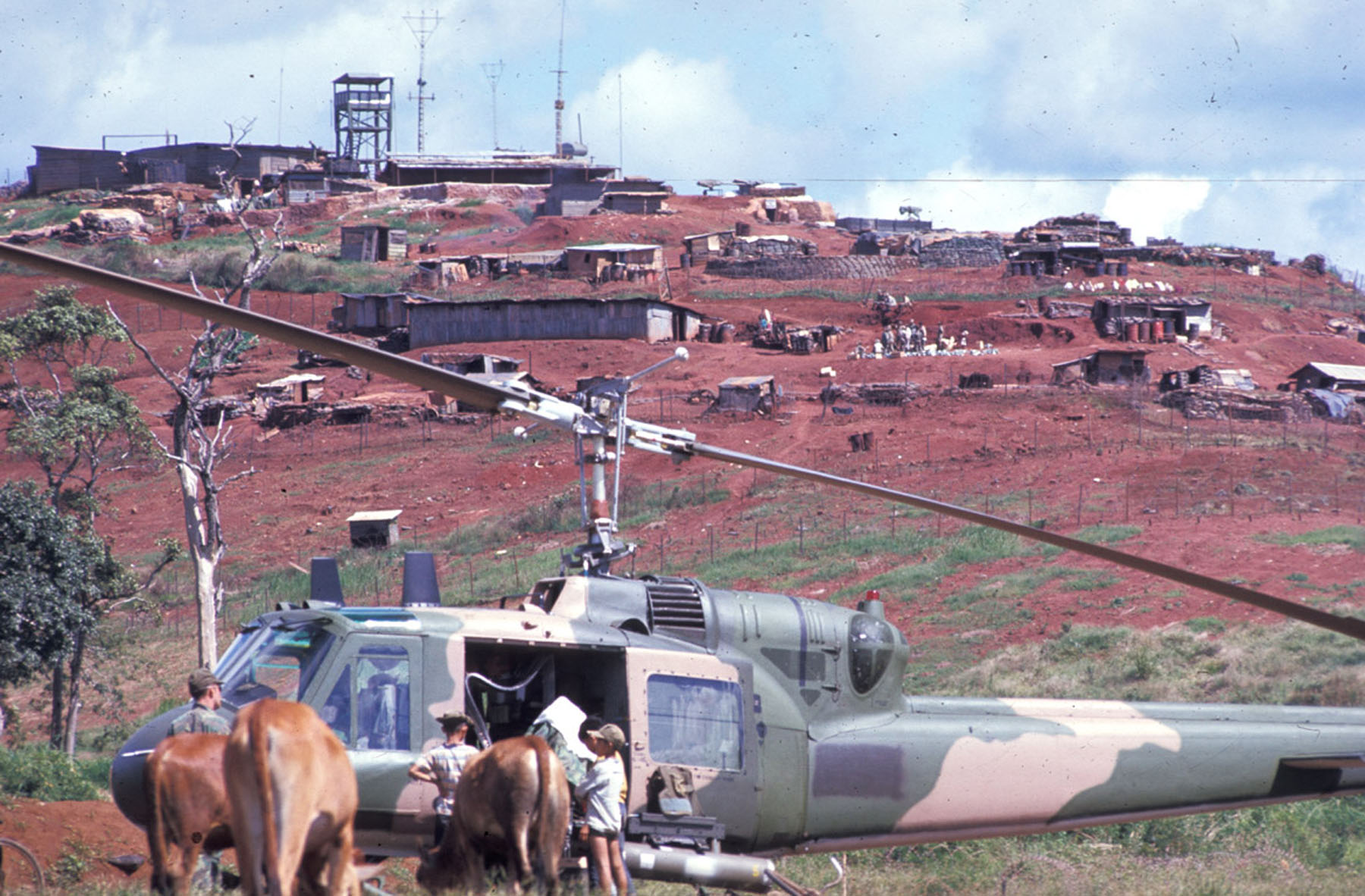
A U.S. Air Force Bell UH-1P from the 20th Special Operations Squadron "Green Hornets" at a base in Laos, 1970

On 23 March 1969, the Royal Lao Army launched a large attack against the communists in the Plain of Jars/Xieng Khoang areas, supported by its own air units and the U.S. Air Force (Operation Raindance). In June, Pathet Lao and PAVN launched an attack of its own and gained ground; but by August, Royal Laotian forces attacked again and regained what had been lost, recovering the Plain of Jars in September 1969 in the Kou Kiet Campaign. In all these operations, the U.S. Air Force flew hundreds of Barrel Roll missions; however, many were canceled because of poor weather.

Pathet Lao forces were supported by PAVN's 174th Vietnamese Volunteer Regiment. By September 1969, the 174th had to fall back to regroup. North Vietnamese forces participating in the campaign included the 316th and 312th Infantry Divisions, the 866th Infantry Regiment, the 16th Artillery Regiment, one tank company, six sapper and engineer battalions, one Nghệ An province local force battalion, and ten PL battalions.

On 11 February 1970, a PAVN and Pathet Lao offensive (part of Campaign 139) opened. By the 20th, control of the Plain of Jars was secure. RLG forces withdrew to Muong Xui. On 25 February, the RLG abandoned Xieng Khoang city. Xam Thong fell on 18 March and Long Tieng was threatened. On 25 April, the campaign ended, with PAVN forces mostly withdrawing from the Plain of Jars; according to Vietnamese sources, after the end of the campaign, the "316th Division, the 866th Regiment, and a number of specialty branch units were ordered to stay behind to work with our Lao friends."

At the beginning of 1970, fresh troops from North Vietnam advanced through northern Laos. The Air Force called in B-52s and, on 17 February, they were used to bomb targets in northern Laos. The enemy advance was halted by Laotian reinforcements, and for the remainder of the year it was a "seesaw" military campaign.

On 1 May, elements of SVN PAVN units (28th and 24A regiments) joined with North Vietnamese Army and Pathet Lao to seize Attapeu.

Although communist movements down the Ho Chi Minh trail grew during the year, the U.S. war effort was reduced because authorities in Washington, believing the U.S. objectives in Southeast Asia were being achieved, imposed budget limits, which reduced the number of combat missions the USAF could fly.

Because of significant logistical stockpiling by PAVN in the Laotian Panhandle, South Vietnam launched Operation Lam Son 719, a military thrust on 8 February 1971. Its goals were to cross into Laos toward the city of Tchepone and cut the Ho Chi Minh trail, hopefully thwarting a planned North Vietnamese offensive. Aerial support by the U.S. was massive since no American ground units could participate in the operation. On 25 February, PAVN launched a counterattack, and in the face of heavy opposition, the South Vietnamese force withdrew from Laos after losing approximately a third of its men.

On 18 December, PAVN and Pathet Lao forces launched counteroffensive (Campaign Z) to recover the Plain of Jars. Volunteer forces included the 312th and 316th Divisions, the 335th and 866th Infantry Regiments, and six artillery and tank battalions. Xam Thong fell and the push continued toward Long Tieng.

Lower Laos – the 968th Infantry Regiment and Pathet Lao forces reclaimed the Tha Teng and Lao Nam areas, and captured the Bolaven Plateau.

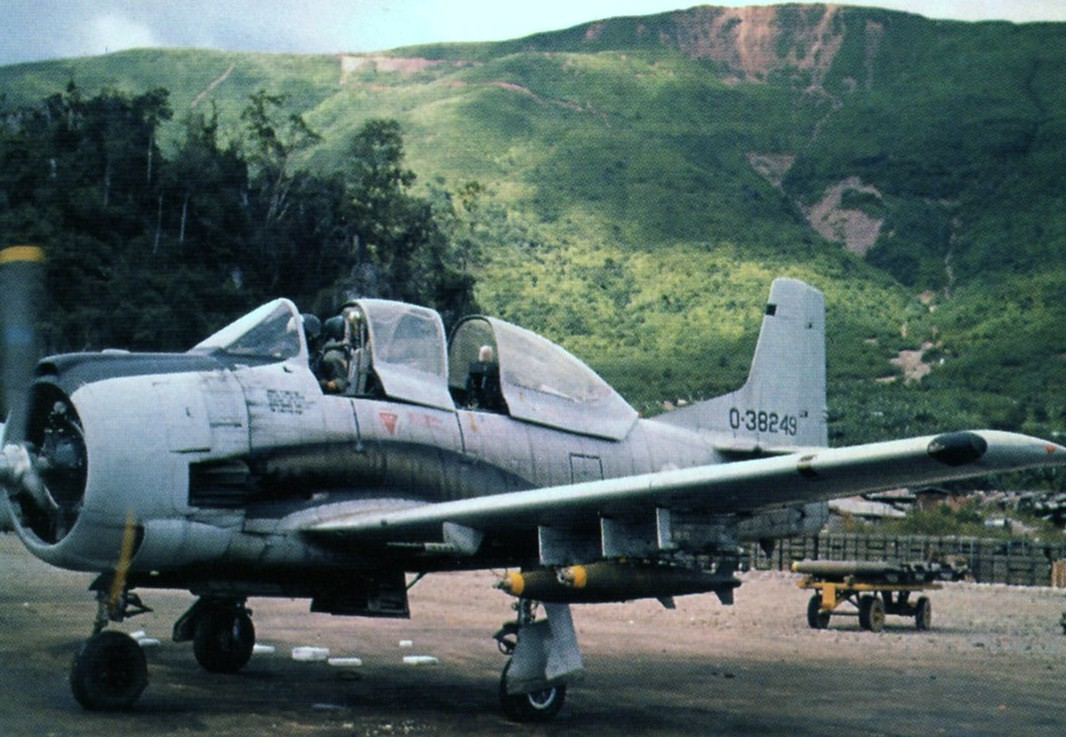
A Royal Lao Air Force (RLAF) North American T-28D-5 Trojan armed trainer loaded with bombs at Long Tieng airfield in Laos, September 1972

During the dry season 1971–72, PL/PAVN forces dug into defensive positions and fought for permanent control of the Plain of Jars. Units participating included the 316th Infantry Division, the 866th, 335th, and 88th Regiments, and nine specialty branch battalions under the command of Senior Colonel Le Linh. Seven PL battalions also participated.

On 21 May, RLG forces attempted to seize the Plain. The battle lasted 170 days (until 15 November 1972). The communists claimed to have killed 1,200 troops and captured 80.

When PAVN launched the Nguyễn Huệ Offensive (known in the West as the Easter Offensive) into South Vietnam on 30 March, massive U.S. air support was required inside South Vietnam and its air strikes in Laos dropped to their lowest point since 1965.

In northern Laos, the communists made additional gains during the year but failed to overwhelm government forces. In November, the Pathet Lao agreed to meet with Laotian government representatives to discuss a cease-fire.

The war had resulted in a large number of refugees with a peak number of 378,800 internally displaced persons under government control in October 1973.

=== 1973–1974 ===
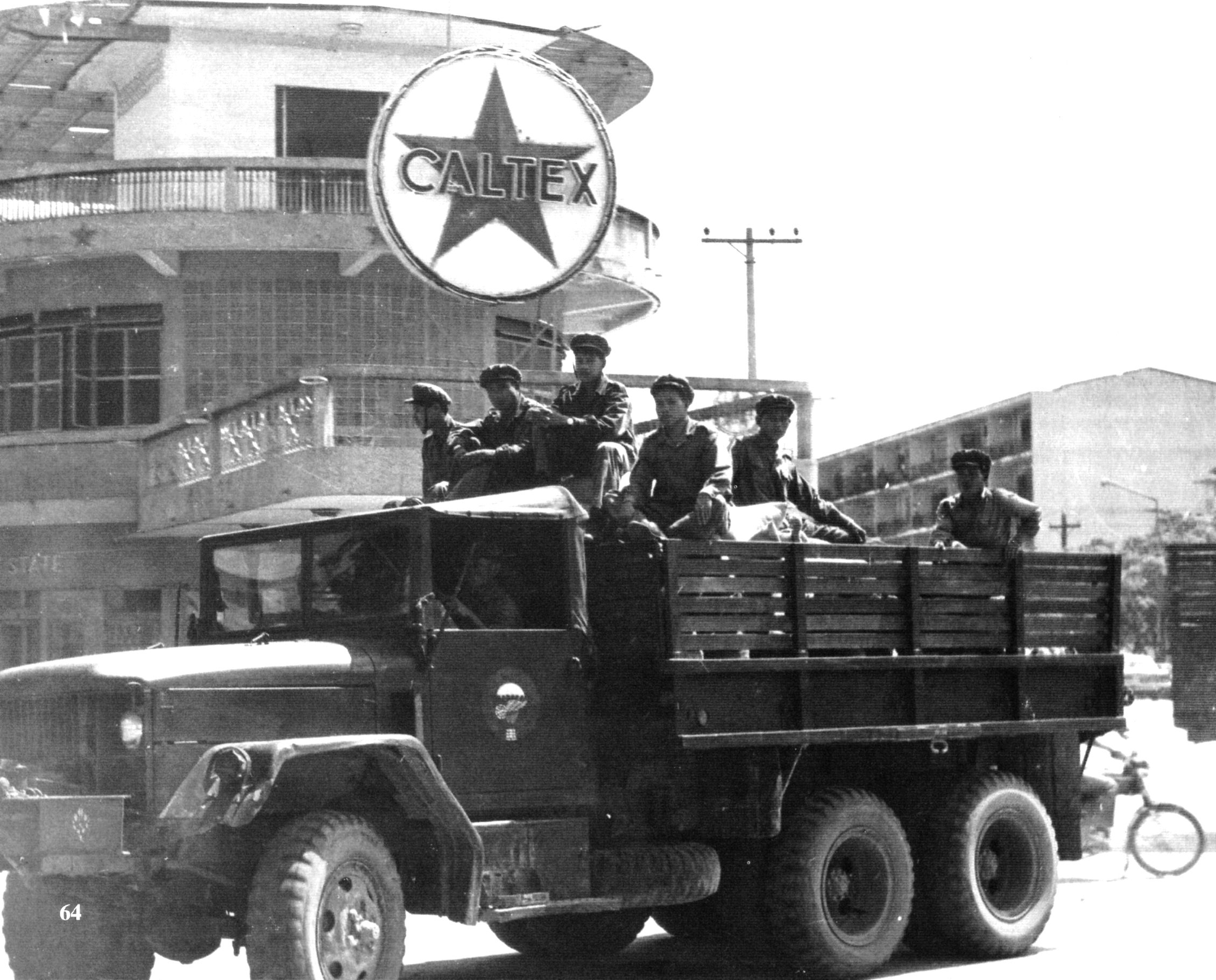
Pathet Lao soldiers in Vientiane, Laos, 1973

The U.S. pulled out of Laos in 1973, as stipulated by the Paris Peace Accords. Thailand likewise began to withdraw its troops from Laos following the signing of the Paris Accords. North Vietnam was not required to remove its forces under the terms of the treaty.

The national government was forced to accept the Pathet Lao into the government. During 1974 and 1975 the balance of power in Laos shifted steadily in favour of the Pathēt Lao as the U.S. disengaged itself from Indochina. Prime Minister Souvanna Phouma was tired and demoralised, and following a heart attack in mid-1974 he spent some months recuperating in France, after which he announced that he would retire from politics following the elections scheduled for early 1976.

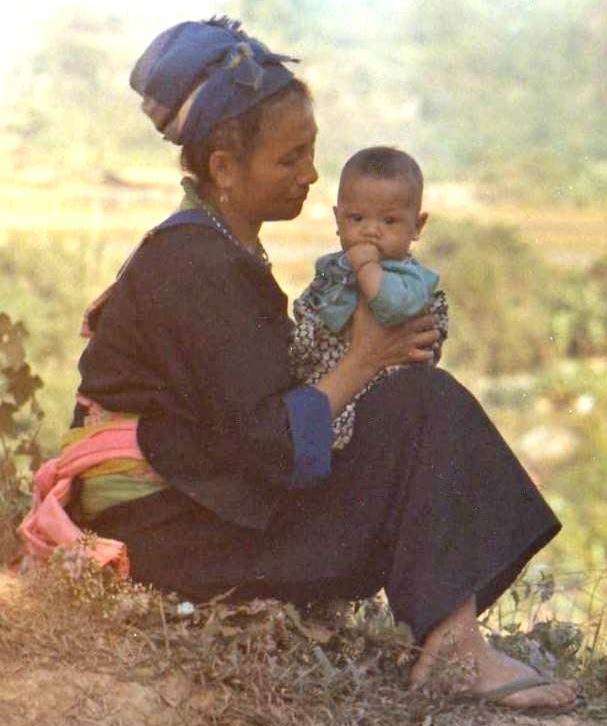
Hmong woman and child at Long Tieng, Laos military base in 1973.

The anti-communist forces were thus leaderless, and also divided and deeply mired in corruption. Souphanouvong, by contrast, was confident and a master political tactician, and had behind him the disciplined cadres of the communist party and the Pathēt Lao forces and the North Vietnamese army. The end of American aid also meant the mass demobilization of most of the non-Pathēt Lao military forces in the country. The Pathēt Lao on the other hand continued to be both funded and equipped by North Vietnam.

In May 1974 Souphanouvong put forward an 18-point plan for "National Reconstruction", which was unanimously adopted – a sign of his increasing dominance. The plan was mostly uncontroversial, with renewed promises of free elections, democratic rights and respect for religion, as well as constructive economic policies. But press censorship was introduced in the name of "national unity", making it more difficult for non-communist forces to organise politically in response to the creeping Pathēt Lao takeover. In January 1975 all public meetings and demonstrations were banned. Recognising the trend of events, influential business and political figures began to move their assets, and in some cases themselves, to Thailand, France or the U.S.

=== Fall of Vientiane ===
In March 1975 the North Vietnamese began their final military offensive in South Vietnam, which by the end of April carried them to victory with the fall of Saigon. Thirteen days earlier the Khmer Rouge army had captured Phnom Penh. The Pathēt Lao now knew that victory was within reach, and with the Vietnam War over the North Vietnamese authorised the seizure of power in Laos. Pathēt Lao forces on the Plain of Jars supported by North Vietnamese heavy artillery and other units began advancing westward.

In late April, the Pathēt Lao took the government outpost at Sala Phou Khoum crossroads which opened up Route 13 to a Pathēt Lao advance toward Muang Kassy. For the non-Pathēt Lao elements in the government, compromise seemed better than allowing what had happened in Cambodia and South Vietnam to happen in Laos. A surrender was thought to be better than a change of power by force.

In the city of Savannakhet, on the border with Thailand along the Mekong River, several Pathet Lao underground organization members launched an uprising against its right-wing leaders. The uprising started shortly after the Laotian New Year festivity. Around late May 1975, after the South Vietnamese government collapsed to the communists, Savannakhet residents, as well as college students, joined the political rally to praise the support of new political shift toward Pathet Lao. Most of Royal Laotian troops were unable to quell the main demonstrations. On May 31, 1975, the largely Pathet Lao troops arrived at Savannakhet without bloodshed at the provincial capital. Presumably, a handful of residents from Savannakhet, as well as right wing political members, fled to Thailand by boat either before or during a swift Pathet Lao takeover. The Pathet Lao soldiers and high-ranking officials marched north to target Vientiane as anti-monarchy protests raged in Vientiane.

Demonstrations broke out in Vientiane, denouncing the rightists and demanding political change. Rightist ministers resigned from the government and fled the country, followed by senior Royal Lao Army commanders. A Pathēt Lao minister took over the defence portfolio, removing any chance of the Army resisting the Pathēt Lao takeover. Prime Minister Souvanna Phouma, dreading further conflict and apparently trusting Souphanouvong's promises of a moderate policy, gave instructions that the Pathēt Lao were not to be resisted, and the U.S. began to withdraw its diplomatic personnel.

The Pathēt Lao army entered the major towns of southern Laos during May, and in early June occupied Luang Phrabāng. Panic broke out in Vientiane as most of the business class and many officials, officers and others who had collaborated with the U.S. scrambled to get their families and property across the Mekong to Thailand. Recognising that the cause was lost, Vang Pao led thousands of his Hmong fighters and their families into exile – eventually about a third of all the Lao Hmong left the country. Pathēt Lao forces took over Vientiane in August 23.

For a few months the Pathēt Lao appeared to honour their promises of moderation. The shell of the coalition government was preserved, there were no arrests or show-trials, and private property was respected. Diplomatic relations with the U.S. were maintained, despite an immediate cut-off of all U.S. aid. (Other western countries continued to offer aid, and Soviet and eastern European technicians began to arrive to replace the departed Americans.) Most Western countries, including the United States, closed their embassies either shortly before or after the establishment of the Laos PDR.

In September 1975, during an interview, Prime Minister Phouma stated his wish to stay in office until 1976 so he could plan the major steps needed for the long-term reunification process, and to ensure the Pathet Lao did not take away some of the political powers of the monarchy. Phouma hoped that the 1976 election will select a new head of state from the majority faction, assumed to be the Pathet Lao, who will create the new nonprovisional government, with the promise of retaining some liberties and potentially be more open diplomatically with non-communist Thailand.

On 2 December, the day after the Pathet Lao-organized National Conference of People's Representatives voted to immediate abolition of the monarchy (on 1 December), King Savang Vatthana agreed to abdicate and Souvanna Phouma resigned. The Lao People's Democratic Republic was proclaimed, with Souphanouvong as President. Kaysone Phomvihane emerged from the shadows to become Prime Minister and the real ruler of the country. A few royal family members, including a Prince, crossed the Mekong River and evacuated to Thailand a few days before the establishment of the Laos PDR, fearing societal upheaval and persecution. With Vientiane secured by the communist Pathet Lao, the Laotian Civil War was officially declared over on December 2, 1975. Arguably by extension, the fall of Laos's capital was the technical end of the Second Indochina War.

By this point, the Pathēt Lao dropped all pretense of moderation, and no more was heard of elections or political freedoms. Non-communist newspapers were closed, and a large-scale purge of the civil service, army and police was launched. Furthermore, the communist Vietnamese government prevented the re-emergence of the Laotian Neutralist Party (LNP) and other right-wing political parties and organisations across Laos, blaming them for instigating the chaotic upheaval on behalf of "foreign imperialists" without direct evidence. Thousands were dispatched for "re-education" in remote parts of the country, where many died and many more were kept for up to ten years. The vast majority of the royal family of Laos, including the deposed king, were also sent to the "re-education camps", where most eventually died from starvation and hard labor during the totalitarian period of the 1980s.

This prompted a renewed flight from the country. About 90 percent of Laos's intellectuals, technicians, and officials left Laos following the communist takeover. Many of the professional and intellectual class, who had initially been willing to work for the new regime, changed their minds and left; a much easier thing to do from Laos than from either Vietnam or Cambodia. In proportional terms, Laos experienced the largest refugee flight of the Indochinese nations, with a full 10% of the population – 300,000 people out of a total of 3 million – crossing the border into Thailand.

Once in power, the Pathet Lao economically cut its ties to all its neighbors (including China) with the exception of reunified Vietnam, and signed a treaty of friendship with Hanoi. The treaty allowed the Vietnamese to station soldiers within Laos and to place advisers throughout the government and economy. This is considered by most historians and journalists to be the end of the Second Indochina War. Consequently, neighboring Thailand banned any export and transit goods to Mekong River at Laos until 1989, when Thai Prime Minister Chatichai Choonhavan eased the trade restrictions, citing the gradual diplomatic normalization between Thailand and Laos.

== Evacuation of the Hmong ==
A dramatic event during the takeover of Laos by the communists was the evacuation of Vang Pao and other Hmong leaders by air from Long Tieng. The end came for Vang Pao on 5 May 1975 when he was called before Souvanna Phouma, the Prime Minister of Laos, and ordered to cooperate with the communist Pathet Lao. Vang Pao took the general's stars off his collar, threw them on the desk of Souvanna Phouma, and stalked out of the room. Four days later the official Pathet Lao newspaper warned that the Hmong people would be exterminated "to the last root."

Jerry Daniels, Vang Pao's CIA case officer, was the only American remaining in Long Tieng and he began to plan an evacuation of the Hmong. However, he had only one airplane to evacuate the 3,500 Hmong leaders and families he judged to be at risk of execution by the Pathet Lao then advancing on Long Tieng. Brigadier General Heinie Aderholt in Bangkok helped to find additional planes and sent three pilots flying two C-46 and one C-130 transport aircraft to Long Tieng. The planes were "sheep-dipped" to remove any U.S. markings as the operation was carried out in secret. The pilots were American civilians: Les Strouse, Matt Hoff, and Al Rich.

With the three American planes, the evacuation began in earnest on 13 May with each transport aircraft making four flights each that day from Long Tieng to Udorn, Thailand and transporting more than 65 people per airplane on each trip – far more than the 35 maximum passengers dictated by safety conditions at mountain-ringed Long Tieng. Thousands of Hmong clustered around the airstrip at Long Tieng awaiting evacuation. On 14 May, Vang Pao and Jerry Daniels were evacuated secretly by helicopter to Thailand and the air evacuation came to an end. The next day the Pathet Lao marched into Long Tieng unopposed. Daniels accompanied Vang Pao to exile in Montana and then returned to Thailand to help the Hmong refugees there.

What nobody had anticipated was how tens of thousands of Hmong, left behind in Long Tieng and Laos, would follow Vang Pao and other Hmong leaders to Thailand. By the end of 1975, about 40,000 Hmong had succeeded to reaching Thailand, traveling on foot through the mountains and floating across the Mekong River. How many died or were killed in their attempt to escape Laos is not known, but the flight of Hmong and other Laotian highland peoples into Thailand would continue for many more years. They faced repression at home from the communist government for their collaboration with the Americans. Most of the Hmong in Thailand would eventually be resettled in the United States and other countries. Between 1975 and 1982, 53,700 Hmong and other highland Laotian refugees were resettled in the United States and thousands more in other countries.

== Aftermath ==
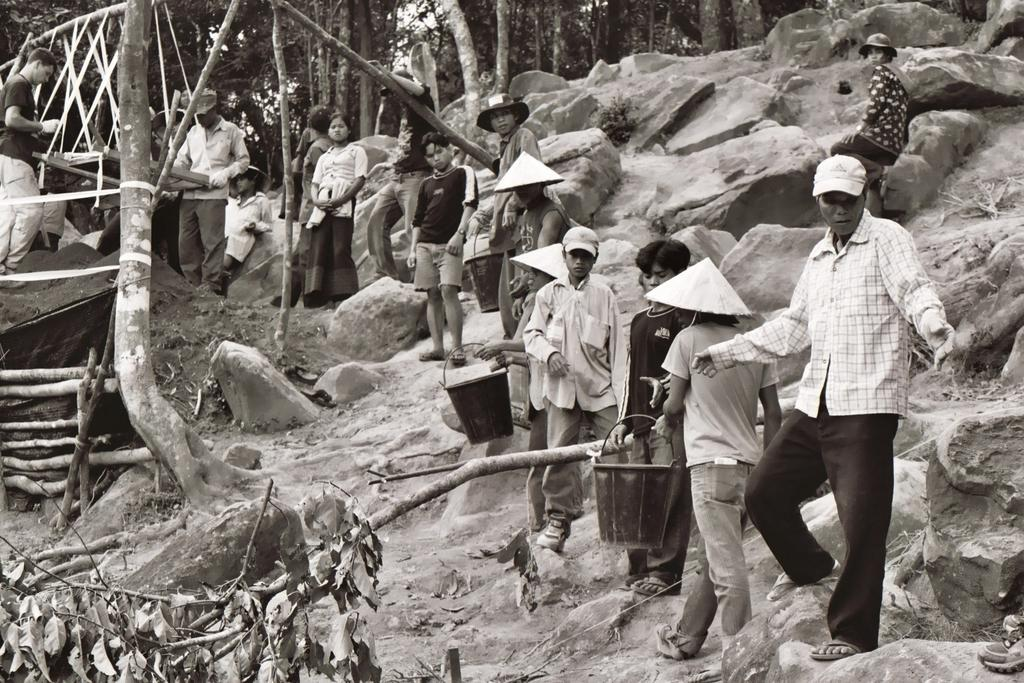
Laotians hired to assist U.S. troops assigned with the Joint POW/MIA Accounting Command sift then move tons of dirt on a mountain near Xépôn, Laos (July 2004)

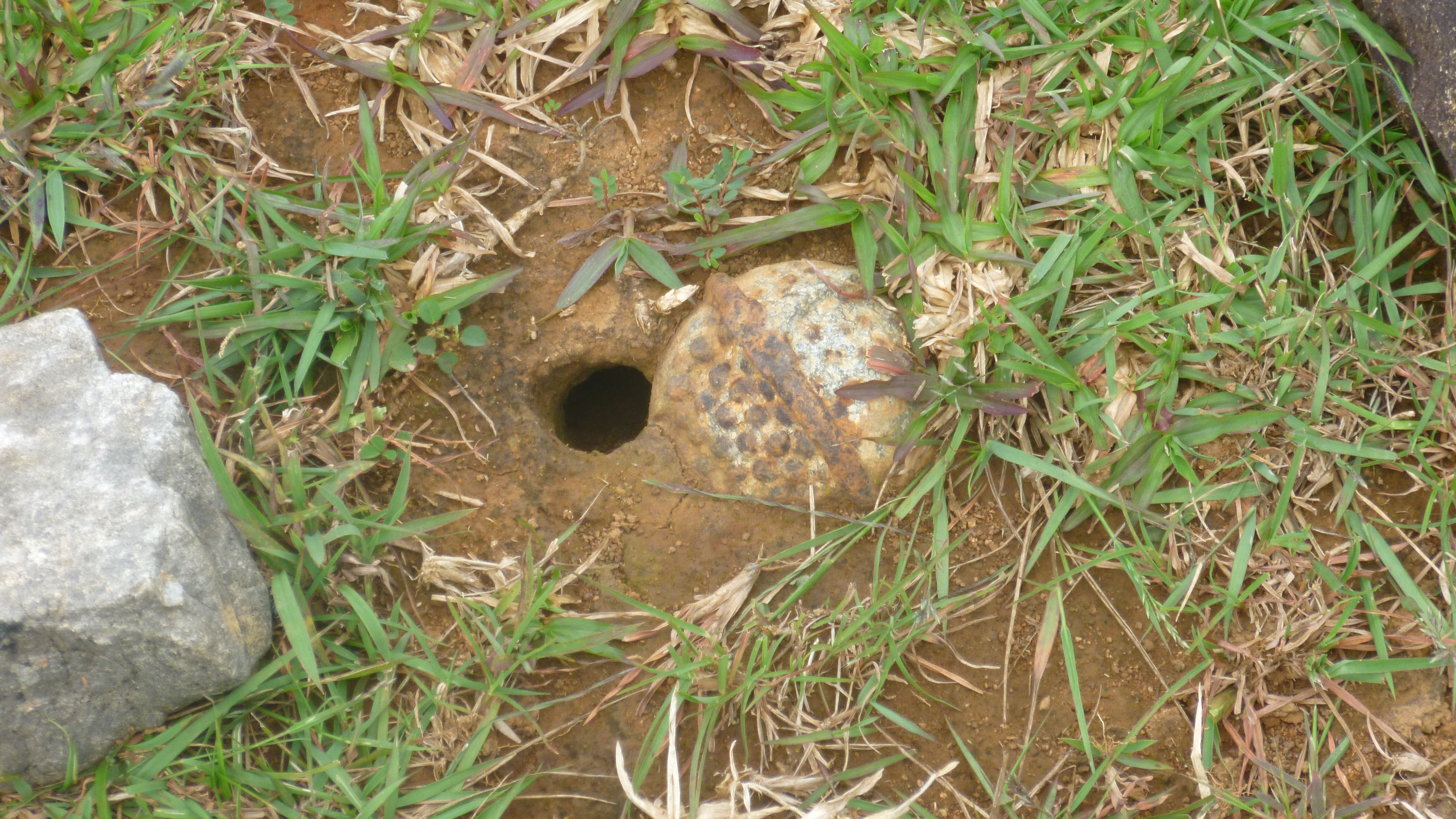
Unexploded cluster sub-munition, probably a BLU-26 type. Plain of Jars, Laos. 2012

Due to the Vietnam War, the Laotian War has been almost forgotten by the majority of people around the world, even in the United States and Vietnam.

According to the Vietnamese government, from 1994 to 2012, the remains of 14,549 North Vietnamese soldiers, who were killed during the war, were found in Laos.

=== Unexploded bombs ===
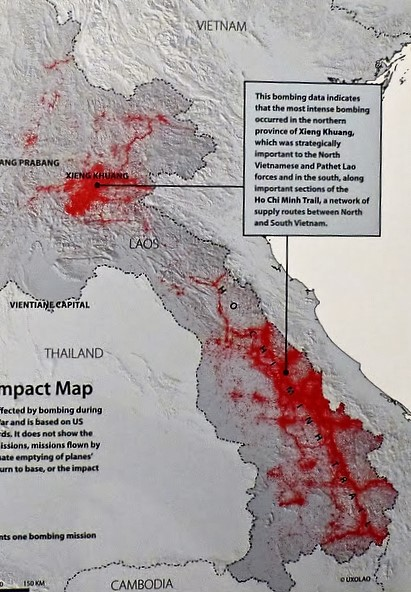
Areas bombed by the US military in Laos from 1964 to 1973

The U.S. dropped 2,756,941 tons of ordnance on 113,716 Laotian sites in 230,516 sorties between 1965 and 1973 alone, making Laos the most heavily bombed country in history relative to the size of its population; The New York Times notes this was "nearly a ton for every person in Laos". By September 1969, the Plain of Jars was largely deserted.

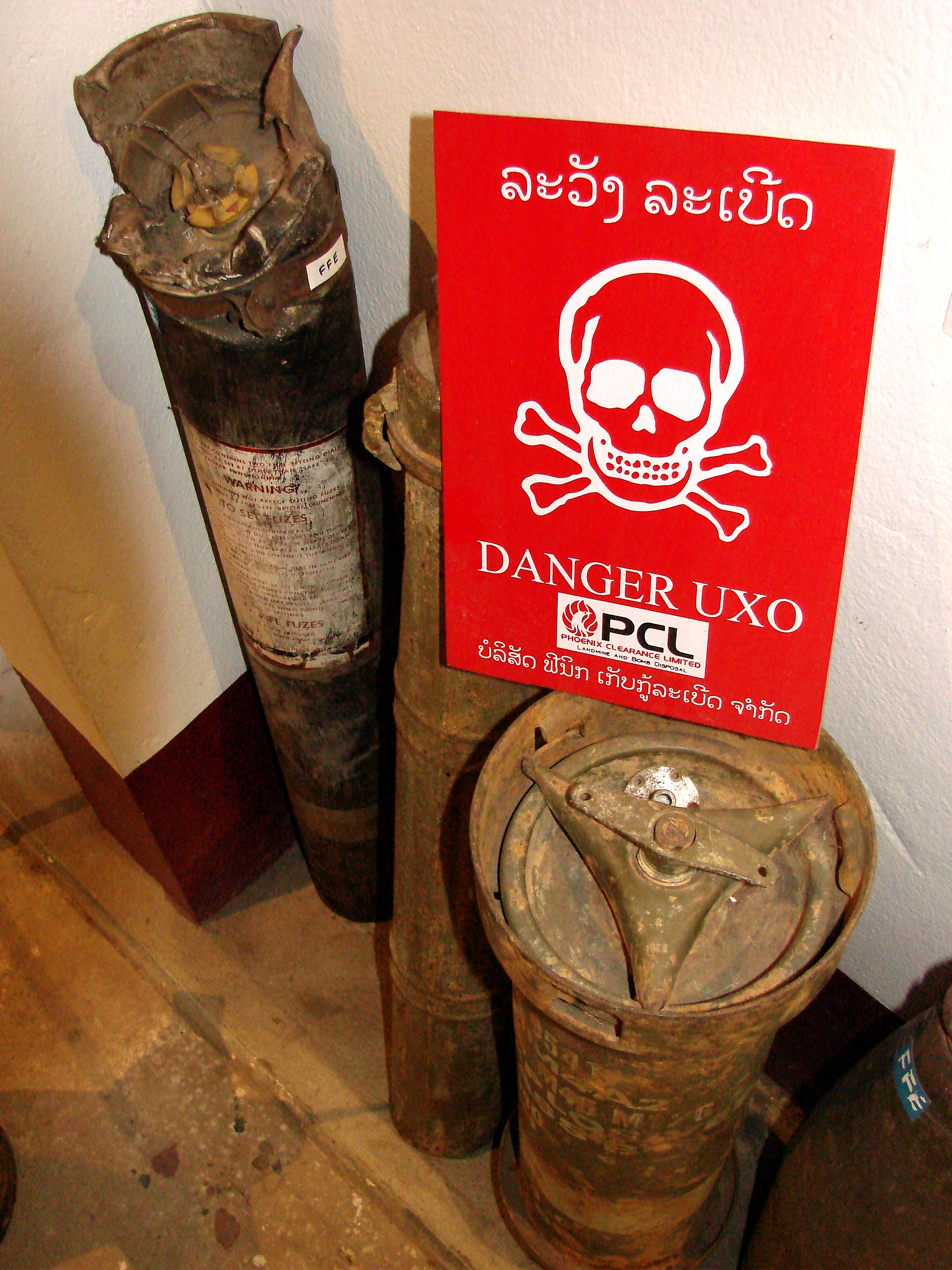
UXO on display at a museum in Vientiane

U.S. aircraft dropped more ordnance on Laos than on all countries during World War II, leaving Laos with about 78 million pieces of unexploded ordnance (UXO) by the end of the war. Casualties continue to mount from UXO dropped by the U.S. and Laotian Air Forces from 1964 to 1973. It has been reported that, between 1964 and 1973, areas controlled by the invading North Vietnamese and Pathet Lao were hit by an average of one B‑52 bomb-load every eight minutes, 24 hours a day. Xiangkhouang Province was the most heavily bombed province. Thirty per cent of bombs failed to explode immediately.

UXO remains dangerous to persons coming in contact, purposefully or accidentally, with bombs. According to a Laotian government survey, casualties from explosive ordnance during the civil war period, between 1964 and 1975, are estimated at 30,000, while casualties since the end of the war from UXO are estimated at 20,000. They estimate 50,000 casualties from explosive ordnance in total, including 29,522 killed and 21,048 injured. Explosive remnants of war (ERW) caused most of the casualties, followed by landmines, and then cluster munitions which caused 15% of casualties. 59 people were known to have been killed or injured by UXO in 2006. So abundant are the remnants of bombs on the Plain of Jars that the collection and sale of scrap metal from bombs has been a major industry since the Civil War. Currently 50 people are killed or maimed every year from UXO.

Due to the particularly heavy impact of cluster bombs during this war, Laos was a strong advocate of the Convention on Cluster Munitions to ban the weapons and was host to the First Meeting of States Parties to the convention in November 2010.

=== Plight of Hmong and other U.S.-allied veterans ===
Many former ethnic Hmong and Laotian veterans and their families, led by Colonel Wangyee Vang of the Lao Veterans of America Institute and Lao Veterans of America, worked to establish a non-profit organization and advocate for honorary U.S. citizenship for the Secret Army veterans. In 2000, the Hmong Veterans' Naturalization Act of 2000 was passed by the Republican-controlled U.S. Congress and signed into law by US President Bill Clinton.

Many of the Hmong people came down from the mountains and surrendered to the Lao government, while others found their way to refugee camps in Thailand. In 2008, however, a repatriation agreement between the Thai and Lao governments resulted in a mass forced deportation of the people in these camps, and reports of atrocities committed against them by the Lao military spurred activist groups to try to persuade the Thai government to keep granting asylum to the refugees, but to no avail.

In 2004, following several years of pressure from a coalition of U.S. human rights activists, the U.S. government reversed its policy of denying immigration to Hmong who had fled Laos in the 1990s for refugee camps in Thailand. In a major victory for the Hmong, the U.S. government recognized some 15,000 Hmong as political refugees and afforded them expedited U.S. immigration rights.

=== Memorial in the US ===
Twenty-two years following the end of the Laotian War, on 15 May 1997, the U.S. officially acknowledged its role in the Secret War. A memorial to American and Hmong contributions to U.S. air and ground combat efforts during the conflict was established by the Lao Veterans of America, the Center for Public Policy Analysis, in cooperation with the U.S. Congress and others. The Laos Memorial is located on the grounds of the Arlington National Cemetery between the John F. Kennedy Eternal Flame and the Tomb of the Unknown Soldier.

== See also ==
- Bomb Harvest
- The Center for Public Policy Analysis
- CIA activities in Laos
- First Indochina War
- Hmong Veterans' Naturalization Act of 2000
- Conflict in Laos involving the Hmong
- Lao Human Rights Council
- Lao Veterans of America
- Laos Memorial
- Lee Lue
- United League for Democracy in Laos
- Vang Pao
- Vang Sue
- Weapons of the Laotian Civil War
- 1967 Opium War

General:

- French Indochina
- Hmong. (1962-02-27 Suphan Buri Province (สุพรรณบุรี): Ruam Wongphan (รวม วงษ์พันธ์, 1922 – 1962), allegedly "chief communist conspirator in Central Thailand" is arrested. He is executed on 1962-04-24 (see below!).
