= January 1967 =

Month of 1967

<<	January 1967					>>
Su	Mo	Tu	We	Th	Fr	Sa
1	2	3	4	5	6	7
8	9	10	11	12	13	14
15	16	17	18	19	20	21
22	23	24	25	26	27	28
29	30	31

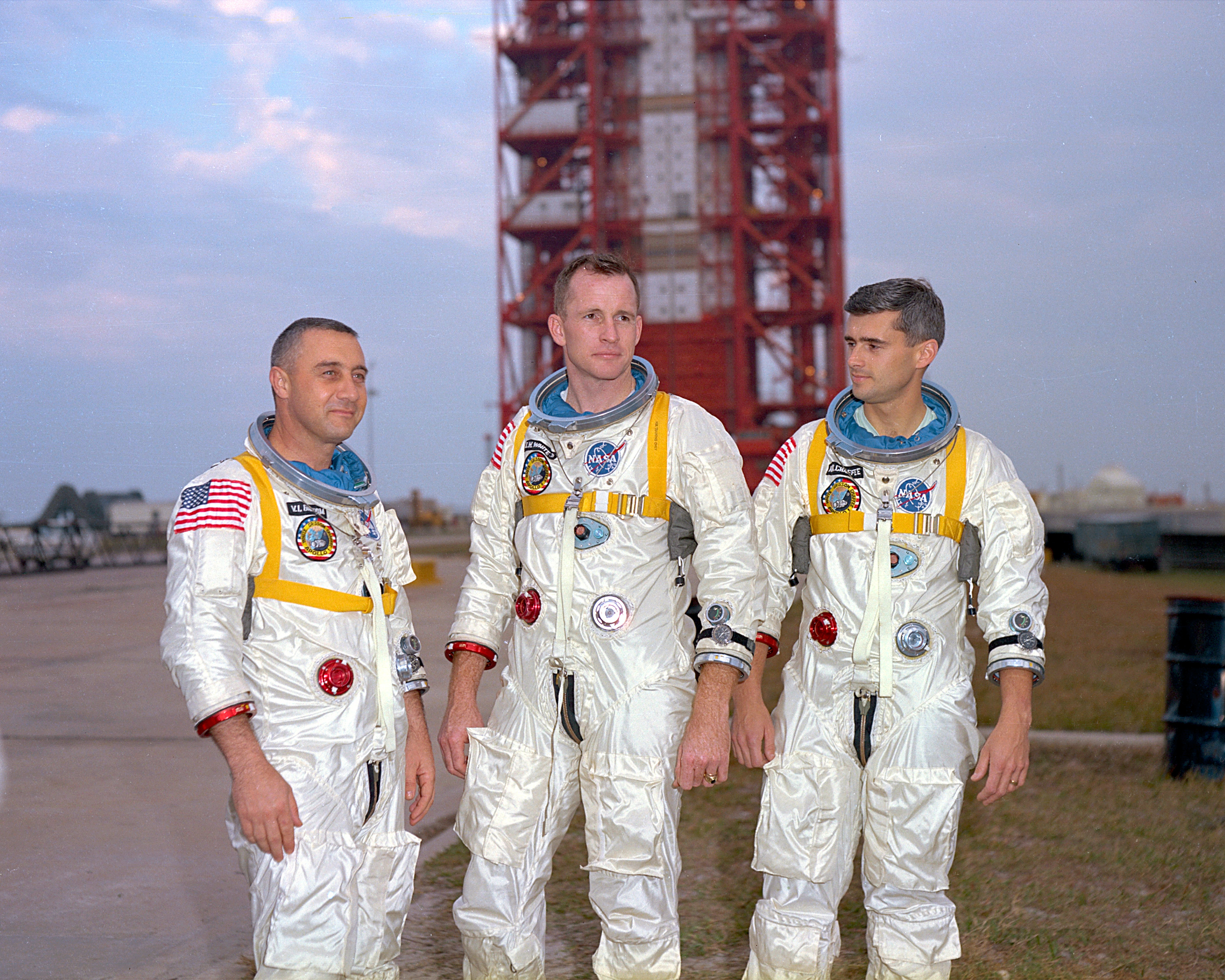
January 27, 1967: Astronauts Grissom, White and Chaffee killed in Apollo 1 fire

The following events occurred in January 1967:

== January 1, 1967 (Sunday) ==
- The residents of the small town of Ellington, Connecticut, saved the life of a private pilot whose radio had failed while he was flying through fog and rain. After townspeople heard a low-flying, but not visible, plane, the Ellington Fire Department brought three fire engines and its 25 volunteer firemen to the town's unlit airstrip at Hyde Field, and dozens of people followed in their cars. Lionel Labreche, a trooper with the Connecticut State Police, directed everyone to park on either side of the runway and to light it up with their headlights. The pilot, Frank Robinson, was able to spot the revolving lights of the fire trucks and then the lit runway; he commented later, "It was wonderful the way they did it. If they hadn't... I'd have ended up in the woods."
- People's Daily, the official newspaper of the Chinese Communist Party, began the new year with the editorial "Carry the Great Proletarian Cultural Revolution Through to the End", directing all Party faithful to launch a general attack on specific people, particularly China's President, Liu Shaoqi; the next day, officials addressing a rally of 10,000 people in Beijing listed twenty charges against Liu.
- Medicaid went into effect in the United States, providing free medical care for disabled low-income people and marking what one observer would later refer to as one of the "key dates after which Americans began outspending the rest of the world on health care," the other one being the July 1, 1966, implementation of the Medicare program for the retired.
- In the two league championship games leading up to the first AFL–NFL Super Bowl, the home team lost both times. The Green Bay Packers won the NFL Championship Game by holding off a rally by the Dallas Cowboys, 34–27, while the Kansas City Chiefs won the AFL Championship, 31–7, over the Buffalo Bills.
- Police raided a Los Angeles gay bar, the Black Cat Tavern, and arrested several patrons for kissing as they celebrated the New Year. The violence that followed would escalate into a more widespread riot.
- In the first elections in Laos to restore voting privileges to all citizens 18 and older, voters favored the Lao Neutralist Party led by Prime Minister Souvanna Phouma.
- Canada began a year-long celebration of the 100th anniversary of the British North America Act, 1867, with the Expo 67 World's Fair as a highlight.
- Died: Maurice Leyland, 66, British cricketer

== January 2, 1967 (Monday) ==
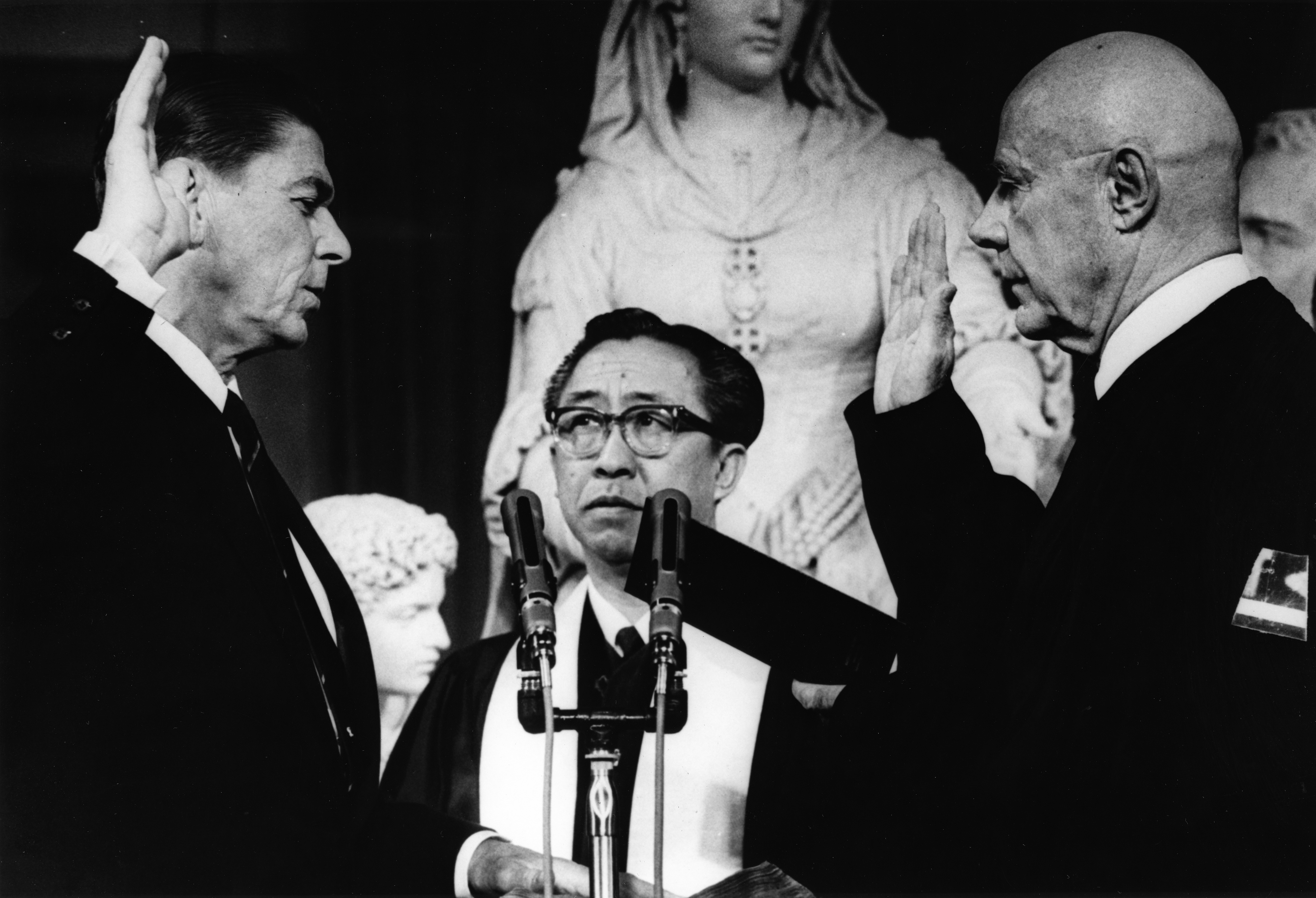
January 2, 1967: Marshall F. McComb swearing in Ronald Reagan as Governor of California

- At 12:01 a.m., future U.S. president Ronald Reagan was sworn in as the 33rd governor of California in an oath administered by state Supreme Court justice Marshall F. McComb. It is believed this specific time was chosen due to Nancy Reagan's astrological advisors. They claimed the stars were in favor of her husband at that time. Reagan took his oath on the Bible that Father Junípero Serra had brought from Spain to California in the 18th century.
- Operation Bolo was a success as the United States Air Force shot down five (and perhaps as many as seven) North Vietnamese MiG-21 jets in the largest air battle fought in the Vietnam War up to that time. Lt. Colonel Robin Olds devised the plan to lure the Vietnam People's Air Force into sending most of its MiG-21 fighters against what seemed to be a fleet of the F-105 fighters that the VPAF had been successful in combating. "The MiGs rose to the bait," an author would write later, "and found the Phantom IIs waiting for them above the dense overcast." As each of four VPAF planes took off from the Noi Bai base, each one was shot down, and the leader of the second formation met the same fate. None of the American fighter jets, all of them F-4C Phantoms, were lost. The USAF pilots counted seven MiG kills, while North Vietnamese and Soviet data counted five, but in either event, the VPAF "Fishbed" force lost a large portion of its 16 MiGs and was grounded for four months.
- U.S. Navy Commander James Stockdale, the senior prisoner of war at North Vietnam's Hoa Lo prison, nicknamed the "Hanoi Hilton" by its inmates, wrote out his first covert message using the "invisible carbon" that had been sent to him by U.S. Naval Intelligence in a letter from his wife. Concealed on the second page of a letter home was Stockdale's list of the names of forty fellow American POWs in the prison camp, written perpendicular to his visible handwriting. The signal that there was a secret message in any given letter was to begin the letter with the word "Darling" and to close with "Your adoring husband."
- Chinese Marxist theorist Zhou Yang became the latest victim of China's Cultural Revolution and the People's Daily published its new editorial, "Criticizing the Reactionary Two-faced Zhou Yang," though the article also contained a subtle criticism of another high party official, Propaganda Minister Tao Zhu, who would become the next Revolution victim two days later.
- North Vietnam's Prime Minister Pham Van Dong signaled in an interview with New York Times correspondent Harrison Salisbury that his nation would begin direct peace talks with the United States if the U.S. maintained an unconditional halt to American bombing, a statement confirmed by President Ho Chi Minh two weeks later.
- United States government agents raided a beach house in Marathon, Florida, and arrested 121 people as they were preparing to lead an expeditionary force to Haiti to overthrow that nation's president, Francois "Papa Doc" Duvalier.
- Pedro Rodríguez won the South African Grand Prix.
- Born: Tia Carrere (stage name for Althea Rae Janairo), American film and television actress; in Honolulu
- Died: Ambikagiri Raichoudhury, 81, Indian poet and nationalist who wrote in the Assamese language

== January 3, 1967 (Tuesday) ==
- A group of at least 20 members of China's Red Guards appeared at the Zhongnanhai section of Beijing, where the nation's prominent party and governmental leaders lived, and invaded the residence of President Liu Shaoqi and his wife, Wang Guangmei, then ordered them to listen to a 40-minute lecture about Liu's failures. Two days earlier, other members of the "Zhongnanhai Insurrectionists Team" had painted slogans on Liu's home, including "No good end to anyone who opposes Mao Zedong Thought!" and "Down with China's Khrushchev, Liu Shaoqi!"
- Brazil enacted its first major conservation measure, the Law on Protection of Fauna, as public law 5197, declaring that "animals of any species, at any stage of their development and living out of captivity... are the property of the State", and prohibiting the "use, persecution, destruction, hunting or harvesting" of the governmental property except as permitted by the national government.
- Israel's Ministry of Defense issued an order to the Israel Defense Forces that they were not to return fire against tank or mortar attacks by Syria from its side of the border, in an effort to prevent violence from escalating into war.
- A reshuffle took place within the government of Luxembourg, under prime minister Pierre Werner.
- Died:
  - Jack Ruby, 55, the Dallas nightclub proprietor who killed accused presidential assassin Lee Harvey Oswald on live television on November 24, 1963; in Dallas of a pulmonary embolism after being diagnosed with terminal lung cancer. As with President John F. Kennedy and Oswald, Ruby was pronounced dead at Parkland Memorial Hospital.
  - Mohamed Khider, 54, exiled Algerian politician and former Secretary General of Algeria's FLN Party, was assassinated in Madrid, three years after he had stolen more than $12,000,000 of party funds.
  - Mary Garden, 92, Scottish operatic soprano and actress

== January 4, 1967 (Wednesday) ==
- British speedboat racer Donald Campbell was attempting to become the first person to race a boat at 300 mph (480 km/h) and apparently reached that speed in his jet-powered hydrofoil Bluebird K7 on Coniston Water, a lake in Lancashire, England. Campbell had reached 297 mph (478 km/h) on his north to south run over 1 kilometre (0.62 mi) and was 150 metres (490 ft) short of completing the south to north return trip at an average speed of "well above 300 mph" when the boat became airborne, flipped, and disintegrated upon hitting the water, killing Campbell instantly. Campbell's radio transmissions could be heard by spectators over an intercom, and his last words were "She's going... she's going..." The Bluebird K7 and Campbell's remains would stay at the bottom of Coniston Water for more than 34 years, until his boat's recovery from the lake on March 9, 2001, and the discovery of his skeleton on May 28 of that year.
- Tao Chu, the Director of the Chinese Communist Party's Propaganda Department and the fourth highest-ranking official of the CCP (after Mao Zedong, Zhou Enlai and Liu Shaoqi), was purged from his position in the wake of the Cultural Revolution. After the Red Guards denounced him as a "bourgeois reactionary", Tao was marched through the streets of Beijing and subjected to what the Associated Press described as "a curbside kangaroo court". In the city of Nanjing, thousands of supporters of Tao clashed with the Red Guards in rioting that killed 54 people and injured over 900 during the next several days.
- The Smithsonian Astrophysical Observatory confirmed the existence of a 10th moon orbiting the planet Saturn, which French astronomer Audouin Dollfus had found while studying a photograph taken on December 15. The satellite, which would be named Janus, marked the first new Saturnian moon discovered since Phoebe was found in 1899.
- The "January Storm" revolution began in China's largest city, Shanghai, as Zhang Chunqiao and Yao Wenyuan—two radical Communists who would later be vilified in Chinese history as half of the "Gang of Four"—incited the takeover of the existing Communist municipal government, as well as its newspapers, radio stations and television station.
- The Doors released their self-titled debut album to critical success. The album is largely viewed as an essential part of the psychedelic rock evolution.
- Born: Marina Orsini, Canadian TV actress; in Montreal
- Died: Ezra Norton, 69, Australian newspaper magnate

== January 5, 1967 (Thursday) ==
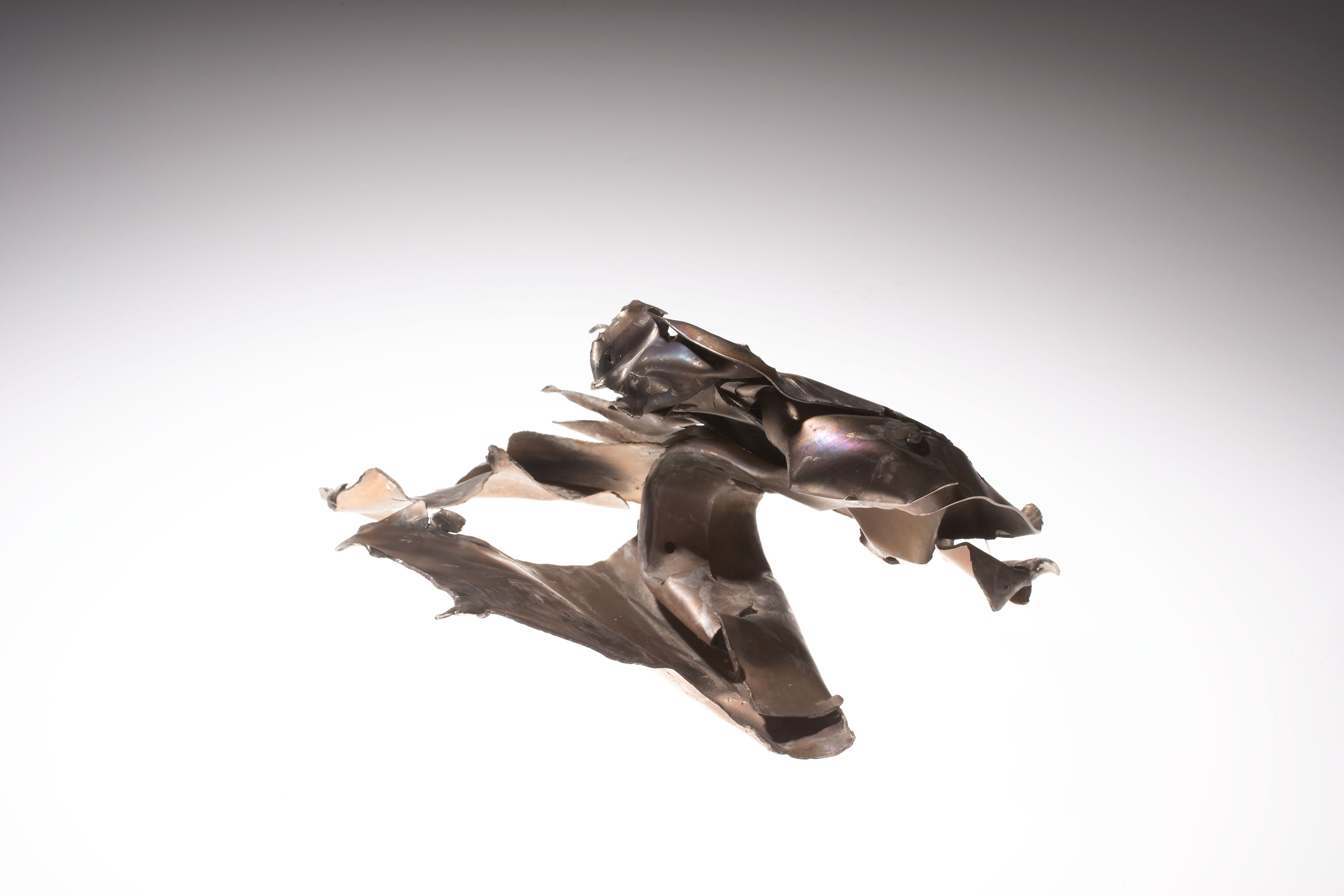
Piece of metal from Walter Ray's Lockheed A-12

- The U.S. Central Intelligence Agency's secret "OXCART" program suffered its first fatality as a Lockheed A-12 reconnaissance jet ran out of fuel while attempting to return to the Area 51 landing strip in Nevada. Pilot Walter Ray reported that he had run out of fuel sooner than expected. He was gliding toward the base when he was forced to eject from the jet at 30,000 feet (9,100 m). Unfortunately, his parachute failed to deploy, and he impacted with the ground, still strapped in his seat. To protect the secrecy of the A-12 program, the U.S. Air Force reported that an SR-71 Blackbird jet was missing and that the pilot had been a civilian.
- The White House confirmed that U.S. President Lyndon B. Johnson had rejected an official portrait painted of him by renowned artist Peter Hurd, and Hurd corroborated the account on the same day. Hurd said that he had painted the portrait in the spring of 1966, and when he presented it to President Johnson at the LBJ Ranch later in the year, Hurd said, the President had gotten angry and said that the painting was "the ugliest thing I ever saw". The White House listed its official objections to the painting, commissioned by the White House Historical Association, describing it as too large, "not consistent with other White House portraits", and containing an image of the U.S. Capitol that was "inappropriate for this kind of portrait".
- Bombers from Egypt dropped canisters of poison phosgene gas on the Yemeni village of Kitaf, near Yemen's border with Saudi Arabia, in an attack on anti-government rebels during the North Yemen Civil War. Those who lived downwind and within 2 kilometres (1.2 mi) of the impact site were the victims, and 95% of them died less than an hour after the bombing. More than 200 people died.
- In London, director Charlie Chaplin's last film, A Countess from Hong Kong, had its world premiere. The romantic comedy starred Marlon Brando and Sophia Loren. Chaplin, famous for being his character "The Tramp" between 1914 and 1940, as well as a director and producer, made a cameo appearance in his last acting role, in the role of "An Old Steward".
- In Paris, Spain and Romania signed an agreement establishing full consular and commercial relations, but avoided full diplomatic relations.
- The government of Jordan closed down the offices of the Palestine Liberation Organization in East Jerusalem and detained its leaders.

== January 6, 1967 (Friday) ==
- British Prime Minister Harold Wilson's Ministry was given a reshuffle as he fired eight of his 23 cabinet ministers. Harold Lever and Peter Shore both joined the ministerial team in the Department for Economic Affairs; Eirene White and Walter Padley left Foreign Affairs, to be replaced by George Thomson and Fred Mulley; and John Stonehouse was made Minister of State for Aviation, his former role of Parliamentary Secretary for Aviation being abolished. Lord Shackleton and Patrick Gordon Walker became Ministers without Portfolio.
- At least 83 Roman Catholic pilgrims were killed in the worst traffic disaster in the history of the Philippines when two charter buses plunged off of a narrow mountain road in the Cavite Province. The buses were part of a convoy of 57 vehicles that was on its way to a religious festival; the brakes of one of the buses failed as it was trying to negotiate a sharp curve, and it slammed into the bus ahead of it and sent both falling into a 60-foot (18 m) ravine.
- An unsuccessful 1966 attempt by comedian Milton Berle to duplicate his successful Texaco Star Theater aired its final episode. Also called The Milton Berle Show, the variety series was unrelated to Berle's original program, which had run from 1948 to 1959. The new show had premiered on the ABC television network on September 9, 1966, and its cancellation was announced on December 4.
- Cao Diqiu (referred to in the Western press at the time as Ts'ao Ti-ch'iu) was deposed as Mayor of Shanghai along with most of the municipal government. The act by Shanghai's rebels was approved by China's leader, Mao Zedong, who "proposed it as an example to be emulated", leading the Red Guards and rebels to "seize power" in their schools and workplaces.
- At Phu Loc in South Vietnam, Vaughn Nickell, a sniper with the 2nd Battalion of the 5th Marines, registered the longest-range confirmed kill in American military history when he killed a Viet Cong sniper at a distance of 1,202 yards (1,099 m), a distance of slightly more than one kilometer away from the target.
- Syrian tanks fired across the Syrian-Israeli border in an attack against Israeli workers near the Tel Katzir kibbutz and the HaOn kibbutz, but, pursuant to orders issued three days earlier, the Israeli army was not permitted to fire back.
- USMC and ARVN troops launched Operation Deckhouse Five in the Mekong Delta of South Vietnam.
- Born: A. R. Rahman, Oscar and Grammy-winning Indian classical music composer; as A. S. Dileep Kumar in Madras (now Chennai)

== January 7, 1967 (Saturday) ==
- A suicide bomber killed himself and five other people, injured eight others, and demolished the three-story-high Orbit Inn in Las Vegas. At 1:25 in the morning, a registered guest in Room 214 of the motel, Richard James Paris, fired a .25 caliber pistol into a bundle of 14 sticks of dynamite, and the explosion killed him, his new bride, and two couples in adjacent rooms. A more recent source, from long after the full investigation, states that the bomber was not a guest at the motel, but smuggled 50 sticks of dynamite into his wife's motel room after he found that she had been cheating on him there.
- The Forsyte Saga, a British television series adapted from the series of novels by John Galsworthy, was broadcast for the first time, originally on BBC2, when six million people watched. The reaction to it was so positive that on its repeat showing the next night on BBC1, 18 million people would tune in, and the show would become popular worldwide.
- The Surveyor 1 lunar probe, which transmitted data from the surface of the Moon to U.S. scientists after landing on June 2, 1966, in the Oceanus Procellarum (the "Sea of Storms"), 35 miles (56 km) north of the crater Flamsteed, ceased transmissions as its battery ran out.
- The U.S. Navy deployed its new Mobile Riverine Force into combat for the first time, as units arrived at Vung Tau in South Vietnam, joining the U.S. Army units that had been operating there since December 19.
- Born:
  - Nick Clegg, English politician who served as Deputy Prime Minister of the United Kingdom from 2010 to 2015; in Chalfont St Giles, Buckinghamshire
  - Irrfan Khan, Indian film actor and producer (d. 2020); as Sahabzade Irrfan Ali Khan in Jaipur
- Died: David Goodis, 49, American mystery novelist, died after suffering a stroke. Goodis, who had sued the ABC television network and United Artists on the grounds that the TV series The Fugitive was based on his 1946 novel Dark Passage, died a month after his deposition had been taken by the attorneys defending the case.

== January 8, 1967 (Sunday) ==
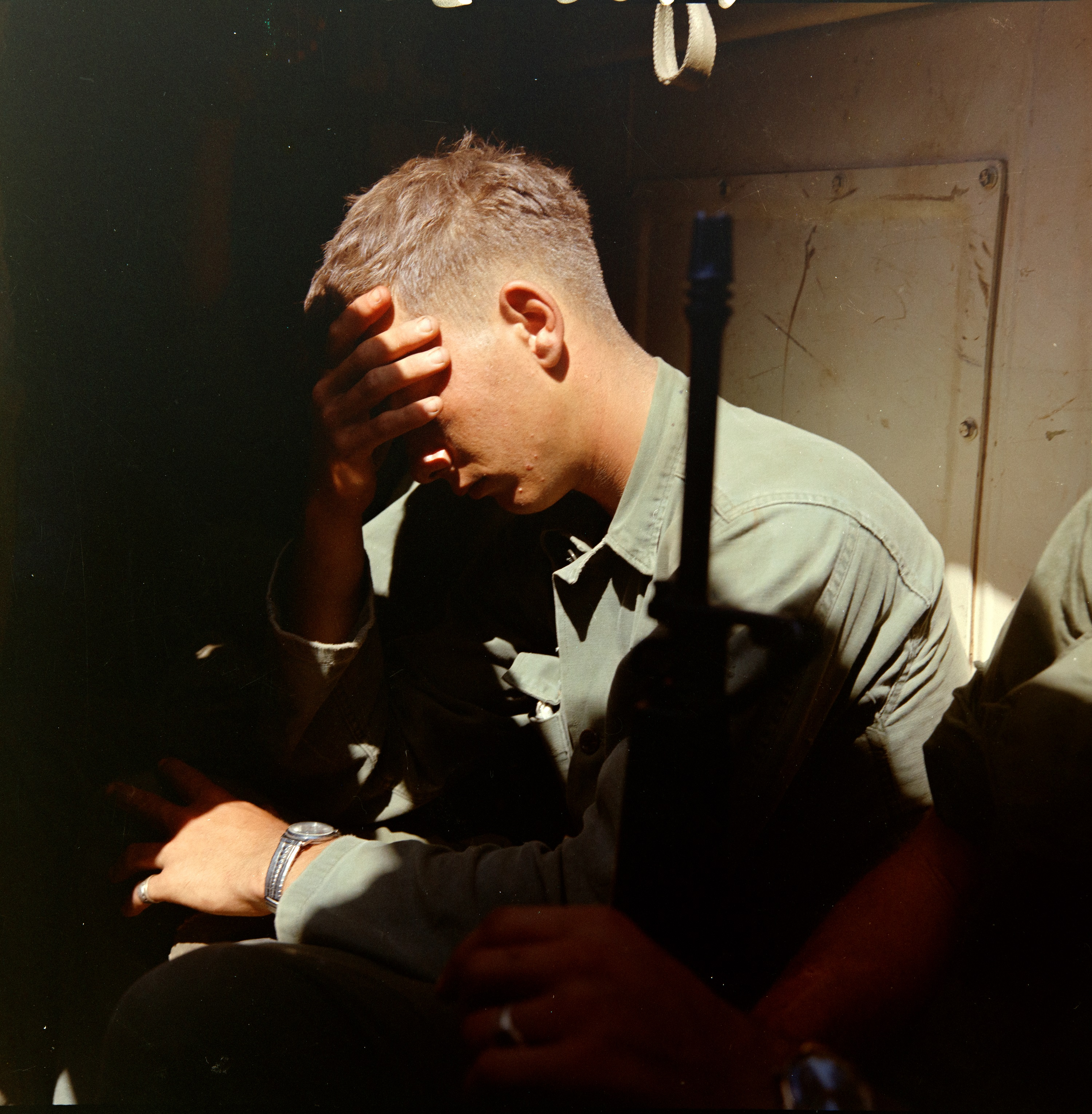
January 8, 1967: An exhausted U.S. Army soldier takes a break inside an M113 armored personnel carrier during Operation Cedar Falls

- Operation Cedar Falls started in the Vietnam War, committing the largest number of U.S. forces (30,000 troops) to battle up to that time, in an objective to drive the Viet Cong out of the "Iron Triangle" region in South Vietnam's Binh Duong Province. After the first phase of the "hammer and anvil" operation began, the main Viet Cong force escaped into the jungle before the "hammer" phase could start, and the attack ended after 19 days. Foremost of the towns that were to be evacuated and destroyed in the 40-square-mile (100 km^{2}) target area was Ben Suc, a base of operations for the Viet Cong, with a population of 3,500. Troops moved in, removed all of the inhabitants (and 2,500 from surrounding villages) to a resettlement area at the Phu Loi Base Camp, then burned the houses and crops and leveled the city with Rome plows, the large armored bulldozers used by Army engineers.
- China's Prime Minister Zhou Enlai appeared at a rally of the Red Guards in Beijing, and directed the group to concentrate its attacks on two of his colleagues, President Liu Shaoqi and Communist Party secretary-general Deng Xiaoping. Zhou named six individuals whom he said the Guards should not persecute, including Foreign Minister Chen Yi, Security Minister Xie Fuzhi, and Oil Minister Yu Qiuli; and three Vice Premiers, Li Fuchun, Li Xiannian, and Tan Zhenlin.
- Born: R. Kelly (Robert Sylvester Kelly), American singer-songwriter and producer; in Chicago, Illinois
- Died:
  - General Yan Hongyan, 57, the First Secretary of the Chinese Communist Party in Yunnan Province, committed suicide after he was accused during the Cultural Revolution of being a "capitalist roader"; Zhou Enlai would comment a week later that "Yan Hongyan is a shameless renegade."
  - Zbigniew Cybulski, 39, one of Poland's leading film actors, was killed when he tried to jump onto a departing train and slipped.

== January 9, 1967 (Monday) ==
- Two parodies of the popular superhero genre premiered on the same evening on American television, with CBS showing attorney-turned-actor Stephen Strimpell in the title role of Mr. Terrific at 8:00 Eastern time, followed by NBC's Captain Nice portrayed by William Daniels. Both were rolled out as midseason replacements in response to the success of ABC's Batman. Nationally syndicated TV critic Rick Du Brow wrote, "Television this week pays homage to the first anniversary of Batman in the way it knows best— imitation."
- Radio stations across China began broadcasting the "Urgent Notice" that had originated in Shanghai, with the warning that "All those who have opposed Chairman Mao, Vice-Chairman Lin, and the Communist China Red Guards, and all those who have sabotaged the Cultural Revolution and production, will immediately be arrested by the Public Security Bureau in accordance with the law. All those who violate rules against economism will immediately be punished as saboteurs of the Cultural Revolution."
- A raiding party from Laos carried out the Ban Naden raid, the only successful rescue of prisoners of war during the Vietnam War; no American prisoners were among those freed from the camp.
- Born:
  - Steve Harwell, American singer, lead vocalist, and frontman for the rock band Smash Mouth from 1994 until his retirement in 2021; in Santa Clara, California (died from liver failure, 2023)
  - Dave Matthews, South African-born American singer who founded the Dave Matthews Band; in Johannesburg

== January 10, 1967 (Tuesday) ==
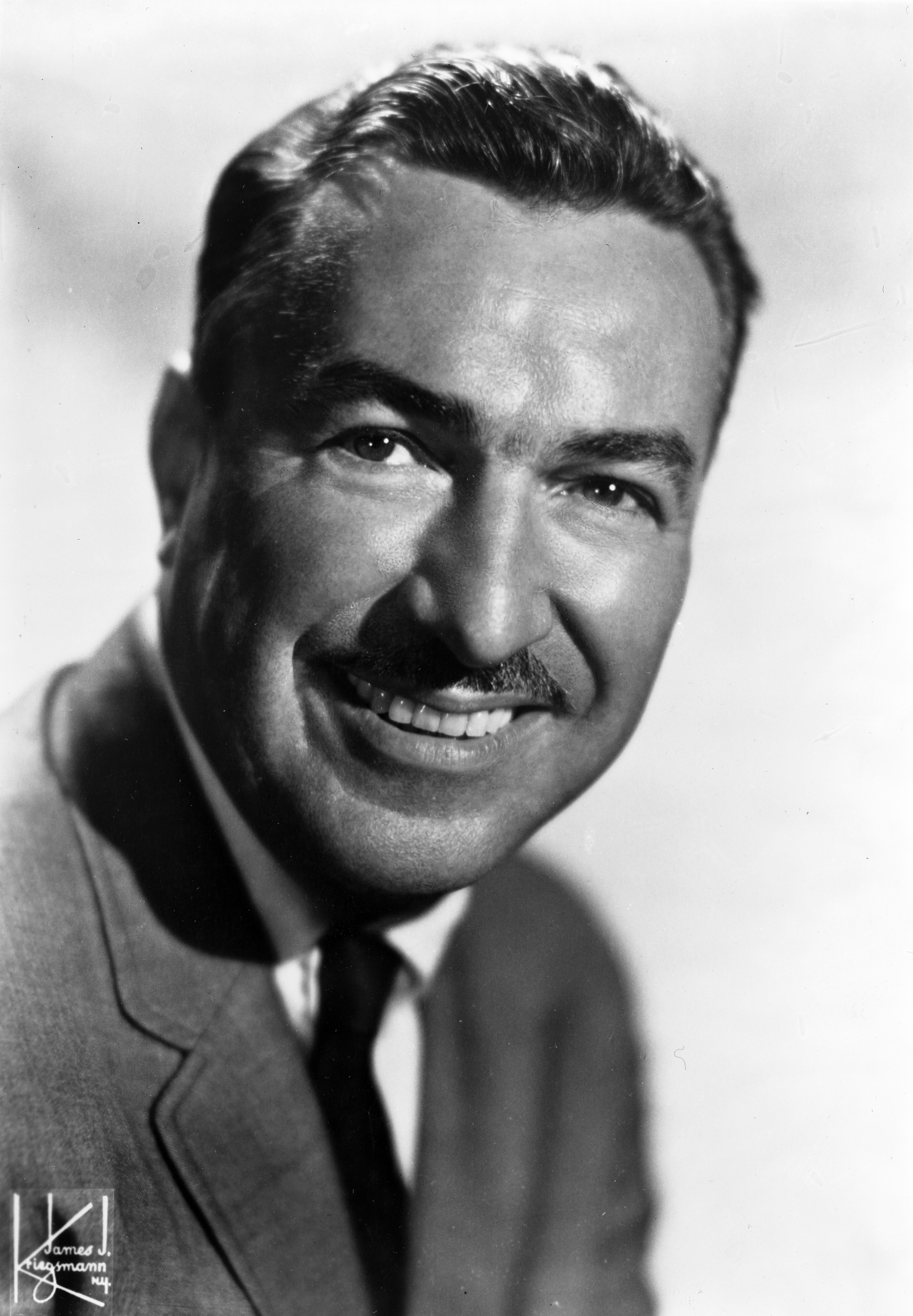
Powell

- The U.S. House of Representatives voted 364–64 to prevent New York's Congressman Adam Clayton Powell Jr. from taking his seat in the House until an investigation could be completed of charges that, as Chairman of the House Committee on Education and Labor, he had mismanaged the committee budget and used its funds for personal matters. After the investigation, the House would vote 307–116 to exclude him from Congress, and he would not return to Congress until 1969, after twice winning re-election.
- In parliamentary elections in the Bahamas, which was then a British colony, the black candidates for the Progressive Liberal Party increased their share of seats from four to 18, while the white candidates of the United Bahamian Party made no increase from its 18 seats in the 38-seat House of Assembly. British Governor Ralph Grey would break the 18 to 18 deadlock (and the even split in the House of Assembly between 19 black and 19 white candidates) by picking Lynden O. Pindling to head a coalition, bringing an end to the dominance of the White elite Bay Street Boys in the 85% black colony.
- President Johnson delivered the annual State of the Union address to Congress, and told the gathered legislators, "I recommend to the Congress a surcharge of 6 percent on both corporate and individual income taxes--to last for 2 years or for so long as the unusual expenditures associated with our efforts in Vietnam continue." Regarding the war, Johnson said, "I wish I could report to you that the conflict is almost over. This I cannot do. We face more cost, more loss, and more agony," and he delivered a record $135 billion federal government budget proposal.
- The Georgia State Legislature resolved the 1966 election for state governor, voting along party lines, 182–66, to elect segregationist and Democrat Lester Maddox over his Republican challenger, Howard "Bo" Callaway. Although Callaway had drawn 3,039 more popular votes than Maddox, neither candidate received the required majority of the popular vote because 7% of the voters had favored an independent, Ellis Arnall. Minutes after the roll call vote, Maddox walked into the governor's office in the Capitol building and was sworn in as the 75th Governor of Georgia.
- Edward W. Brooke from Massachusetts was seated as the first popularly elected African American United States Senator.

== January 11, 1967 (Wednesday) ==
- San Diego was granted a National Basketball Association (NBA) franchise as the NBA expanded to from 10 teams to 12 for the 1967–68 season, after the Seattle SuperSonics (now the Oklahoma City Thunder) had been granted the 11th franchise in December. The new team would be named the San Diego Rockets, making its debut at the same time as the Denver Rockets (now the Denver Nuggets) of the American Basketball Association. San Diego's team would move to Houston in 1971, retaining the still-appropriate name Rockets.
- Deng Xiaoping, who would serve as the leader of the People's Republic of China from 1978 until his death in 1997, was demoted along with several other members of the Communist Party Politburo. Deng, along with Liu Shaoqi and Chen Yun, was barred from participating in Politburo meetings because he was accused of "taking the capitalist road".
- People's Daily carried its new notice, "The 'January Storm' that Initiated the Power Seizure", praising the recent purges of Communist party officials who had fallen out of favor. The death and violence that followed would prove to be the height of the Cultural Revolution.
- The Intelsat II F-2 communications satellite was successfully launched from Cape Canaveral Air Force Station Space Launch Complex 17.
- Died:
  - Sir Eruera Tirikatene, 72, New Zealand Maori politician and the first believer of the Ratana religious faith to serve as a national legislator.
  - Wolfgang Zeller, 74, German film composer

== January 12, 1967 (Thursday) ==
- Following his death from cancer, Professor James Bedford became the first person to be cryonically preserved with the intent of future resuscitation. Dr. Bedford, a psychology professor at the Glendale College in California, had taken advantage of an offer by the cryonics advocacy organization, the Life Extension Society, to freeze the first candidate postmortem at no charge, and had moved into a nursing home so that the procedure could be started immediately after his death. When his heart stopped beating at 1:15 in the afternoon, his body was frozen in a solution of dimethyl sulfoxide as a protectant against skin cell damage, then transferred to storage in liquid nitrogen until the day that science might be able to restore him to life; after 1982, Bedford would be housed at the Alcor Life Extension Foundation in Scottsdale, Arizona, where he would still be maintained more than 50 years after his death.
- Died: U.S. Marine Corps General Holland M. Smith, 84, pioneer in U.S. amphibious warfare and commander of amphibious operations in the Pacific theater of war during World War II. Because of his initials and his quick temper, H. M. (Holland McTyeire) Smith earned the nickname "Howlin' Mad Smith" during the First World War.

== January 13, 1967 (Friday) ==
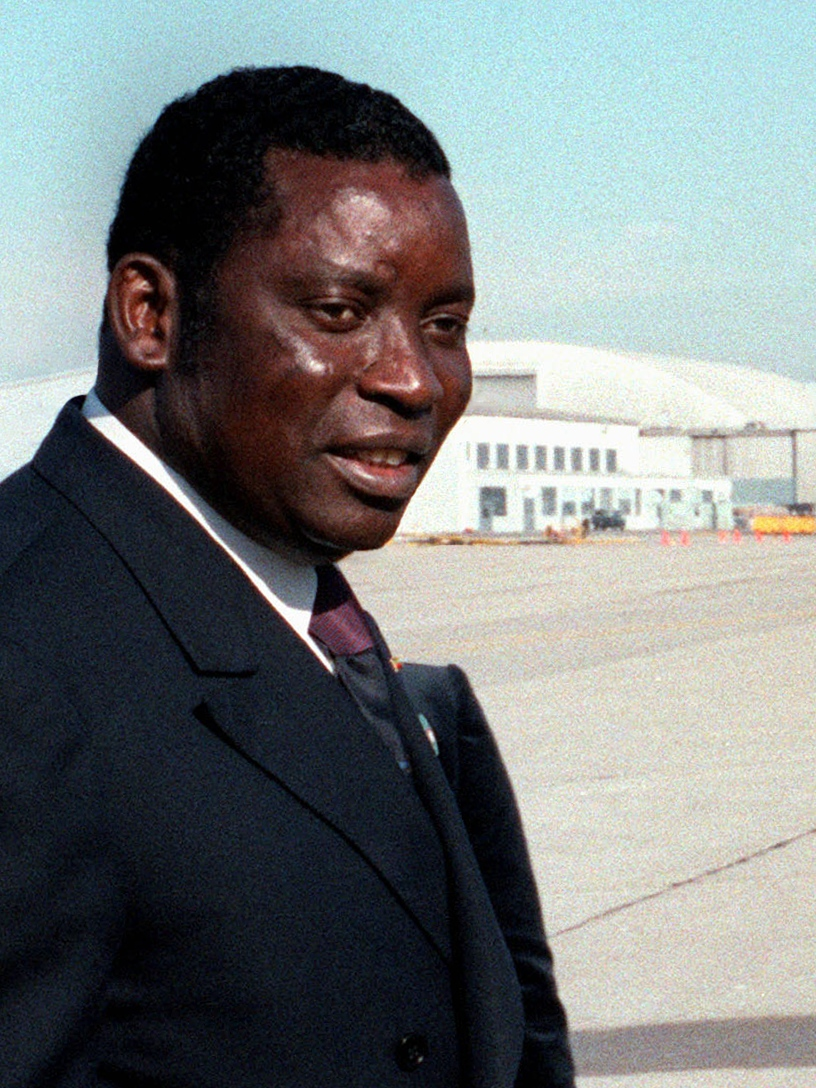
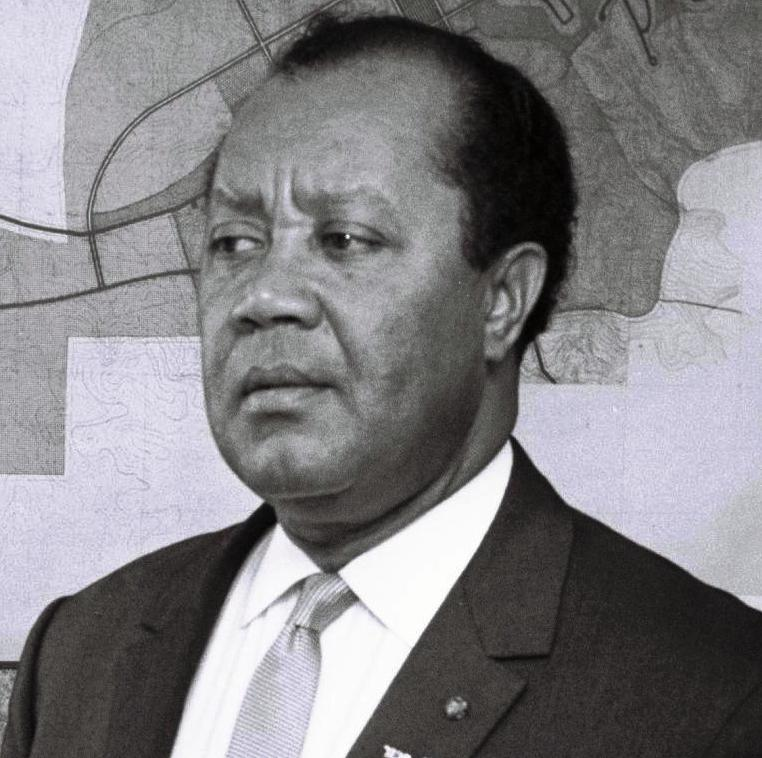
Lt. Col. Eyadema and President Grunitsky
- Lieutenant Colonel Étienne Eyadema of the Army of Togo led his 1,200 troops to seize key locations throughout the west African nation, and forced President Nicolas Grunitzky to resign. Eyadema would guide Togo as the Chairman of a "Committee of National Reconciliation" until April 14, when he would be named President. For 38 years (during which time he would change his name to Gnassingbé Eyadéma), he would preside over Togo until his death on February 5, 2005.
- Mao Zedong, the Chairman of the Chinese Communist Party, signaled through editorials in the newspaper People's Daily and the theatrical journal Red Flag that he would purge the People's Liberation Army of all counterrevolutionaries. "We will crush completely all bourgeois lines and defend to the last the proletarian revolution line." Mao named his wife, Jiang Qing, as an adviser to a new committee in the PVA. On the same day, the Party would announce what it called "The Six Public Security Regulations", harsh measures that prescribed prison sentences and even the death penalty for sedition.
- Members of the New York Police Department saved about 300 sleeping residents of the Jamaica section of the borough of Queens, running from house to house in the 20 minutes before a natural gas explosion leveled houses and started a fire that eventually destroyed 22 buildings. The NYPD was alerted at 5:11 in the morning, and the underground gas lines exploded at 5:30, but only four people were hurt, none seriously.
- The board of directors of the 45-year-old Douglas Aircraft Company voted to accept a $68.7 million offer from McDonnell Aircraft Corporation to purchase its stock, after the Douglas company had run deeply into debt during the research and development of its DC-10 jetliner. On April 28, the forced merger would be completed, and the new enterprise would be named the McDonnell Douglas Corporation.
- The air forces of Communist China and Nationalist China fought an air battle over the Straits of Taiwan, with 12 MiG-19 jet fighters from mainland China engaging four F-104G Starfighter jets from Taiwan. During the battle, one MiG and one Starfighter were shot down.

== January 14, 1967 (Saturday) ==
- Organized by counterculture publisher Allen Cohen and artist Michael Bowen, the Human Be-In took place at the Polo Grounds in San Francisco's Golden Gate Park, with 20,000 hippies gathering in the Haight-Ashbury district to see performances by the Grateful Dead, poet Allen Ginsberg, comedian Dick Gregory, activist Jerry Rubin, and psychologist and LSD advocate Timothy Leary, who urged the audience to "turn on, tune in, and drop out". Media coverage of the event introduced the American public to the hippie movement and set the stage for what would be described as "The Summer of Love".
- The sinking of a South Korean ferry boat killed 44 people. The ferry Hanliho, collided with a Republic of Korea Navy destroyer escort, ROKS Chungmu, a mile from the port of Jinhae. Only 16 passengers and crew were saved. The ferry was traveling from Yeosu to Pusan, while ROKS Chungmu was returning to Jinhae following a drill.
- Louis Leakey announced the discovery of pre-human fossils in Kenya, evidence of the earliest known ancestor of Homo sapiens and dating back 20,000,000 years. Leakey, whose team unearthed the fossils at Rusinga Island in Lake Victoria, announced that he had named the species Kenyapithecus africanus.
- The Sound of Music closed out its 2,385th and final performance at the Palace Theatre in the West End of London, where it had started on May 18, 1961. The Broadway production in New York City had run for 1,443 shows before closing in 1963.
- Born: Leonardo Ortolani, Italian comic book author and creator of Rat-Man for Marvel Italia; in Pisa

== January 15, 1967 (Sunday) ==
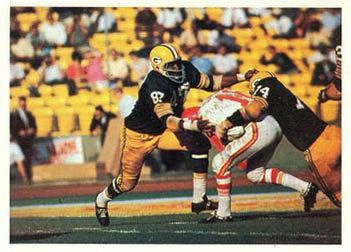
NFL Packers 35, AFL Chiefs 10

- The Green Bay Packers of the NFL defeated the Kansas City Chiefs of the AFL, 35–10, at the First AFL–NFL World Championship Game at the Los Angeles Memorial Coliseum to win the first interleague championship of American professional football. At the time, the name "Super Bowl" was unofficial. The highest price for a ticket was only $12.00 (equivalent to $87 fifty years later), but the stadium was filled to only two-thirds capacity.
- The Rolling Stones appeared on The Ed Sullivan Show for the second time, but only after acceding to a demand by Sullivan to alter the words of their hit song, "Let's Spend the Night Together". After Sullivan reportedly said, "Either the song goes or the Stones go," Mick Jagger sang the refrain as "Let's spend some time together."
- British Prime Minister Harold Wilson arrived in Rome to begin negotiations for the United Kingdom to gain membership in the European Economic Community, more commonly known at the time as "The Common Market".
- Ma Sicong, the premier violinist in China, was able to escape the People's Republic along with his family, and fled by boat to Hong Kong. By April, he and the Ma family would be resettled in the United States.

== January 16, 1967 (Monday) ==
- The "Garrity warning" became a requirement for all internal investigations of government employees as the U.S. Supreme Court entered its decision in Garrity v. New Jersey, and required that people be advised that they did not have to answer questions at the risk of self-incrimination, that disciplinary action could not be taken against them solely for their refusal to answer questions, and that statements made by them could be used as evidence in criminal or administrative proceedings. Information gathered before a warning could be given would be excluded from evidence under the Fifth Amendment of the U.S. Constitution. Edward Garrity, the police chief of Bellmawr, New Jersey, was one of six individuals whose conviction was overturned by the Garrity decision.
- A referendum (referred to officially by the Indian government as an "Opinion Poll") was held in the Union Territory of Goa, Daman and Diu, to determine whether the former Portuguese colonies would remain a single political unit, or whether they would be split, with Goa merging into the Maharashtra State and Daman and Diu being incorporated into the Gujarat State. By a margin of 54.2%, the voters decided to keep their territory as a UT. On May 31, 1987, Goa would split from Daman and Diu to become the 25th state of India, while Daman and Diu continued together as a UT.
- At St. Bartholomew's Hospital in London, gynecologist Gordon Bourne led a team of surgeons in performing the first fetal exchange transfusion on a human being, replacing the blood of an unborn child who was endangered by Rh factor incompatibility. Because a safe premature delivery was deemed unfeasible, the Rh positive blood of the fetus was completely removed and replaced with one fifth of a pint of the mother's Rh negative blood, two months ahead of the March 21 due date.
- Chinese newspapers carried the first photographs of the public humiliation of government officials shamed in the Cultural Revolution. The four people wearing signs in public were former CCP Central Committee official (and future President of China) Yang Shangkun; former Vice Premier and General Luo Ruiqing; former Culture Minister and Deputy Vice Premier Lu Dingyi; and former Beijing CCP First Secretary Peng Zhen.
- At least half of North America's largest convention center, McCormick Place in Chicago, Illinois, was destroyed by a fire. The fire, reported by janitors at 2:05 a.m., started inside one of the 2,357 booths in the annual exhibit of the National Houseware Manufacturers Association and destroyed the main exposition hall, causing the roof to collapse and killing security guard Kenneth Goodman.
- Jacqueline Kennedy, the former First Lady of the United States, settled her lawsuit against author William Manchester and the Harper & Row publishing company, which had temporarily enjoined the publication of Manchester's book, The Death of a President.
- Lucius Amerson was sworn in as the first black county sheriff in the Deep South in the 20th century, and assumed the role of chief law enforcement official in Macon County, Georgia.
- Born: Fat Mike (stage name for Michael John Burkett), American punk rock musician; in Newton, Massachusetts

== January 17, 1967 (Tuesday) ==
- U.S. Senator Ralph Yarborough of Texas introduced the Bilingual Education Act, Senate Bill 428, as an amendment to the 1965 Elementary and Secondary Education Act. The Act, the first American plan to provide education in Spanish as well as English to Mexican-American students in order to make them fully literate in the English language while educating them at the same time in other core curricula. Yarborough declared that the typical Mexican-American child "is wrongly led to believe from his first day of school that there is something wrong with him because of his language. This misbelief soon spreads to the image he has of his culture, of the history of his people, and of his people themselves. This is a subtle and cruel form of discrimination."
- Eduardo Frei, the President of Chile, was forced to decline an invitation to meet U.S. President Johnson at the White House on February 1, after the Chilean Senate voted 23 to 15 to deny him permission to leave the country. Under Article 43 of the Chilean constitution, congressional approval was required for an incumbent president to depart, a seldom-used provision from the 19th Century that had been "aimed at preventing presidents from absconding with the national treasury." Members of rightist and leftist opposition parties had joined in the unprecedented move as a protest against the United States, and President Frei's cabinet ministers resigned in response to the vote.
- Arkansas State University was elevated by the Arkansas legislature to full university status, 56 years after it had been founded as the First District Agricultural School, a high school in Jonesboro, Arkansas. In 1918, it began offering a two-year college program, and in 1930, was authorized to give a four-year degree program as First District Agricultural and Mechanical College, then as Arkansas State College. As a university, ASU became only the second institution in Arkansas to offer a master's degree and doctoral degree program.
- The UK's Daily Mail printed a story about a custody hearing following the suicide of a minor celebrity and another story about holes in the road in Blackburn, Lancashire. Both events would be turned into lyrics in the song "A Day in the Life" by The Beatles, released later in the year.
- Born: Song Kang-ho, award-winning South Korean film actor; in Gimhae
- Died: Evelyn Nesbit, 82, American artists' model, chorus girl and actress, known for her husband's murder of architect Stanford White in 1906

== January 18, 1967 (Wednesday) ==
- Albert DeSalvo, the "Boston Strangler", was convicted of numerous crimes other than the 13 homicides of which he had been accused, and was sentenced to life in prison. The life sentence was for armed robbery, while the other indictments were for breaking and entering, assault and battery, and "unnatural and lascivious acts", for which DeSalvo's attorney, F. Lee Bailey, had sought to argue that the defendant was not guilty by reason of insanity. The jury's rejection of the insanity plea marked the first loss for Bailey in a major case; the defense had already admitted that DeSalvo had committed the lesser crimes and framed the issue as whether DeSalvo was legally insane. Pending an appeal, DeSalvo would continue to be confined at the Bridgewater State Hospital.
- The United States Air Force launched eight communications satellites into orbit on a Titan IIIC rocket, increasing its "globe girdling satellite communications network" to 15 located above the Earth and closing the gaps between the seven launched in 1966.
- Jeremy Thorpe became leader of Britain's Liberal Party, after receiving the votes of six of the 12 Liberal Party MPs in the House of Commons, ahead of Emlyn Hooson and Eric Lubbock, who each had three votes.
- Nineteen coal miners were killed in an explosion at the largest coal mine in New Zealand, the Strongman colliery, located at Greymouth, on the South Island.
- A Fistful of Dollars, the first significant "spaghetti Western" film directed by Sergio Leone, was released in the United States.
- Born: Iván Zamorano, Chilean soccer football star for Real Madrid, with 69 caps for the Chile national team; in Santiago
- Died: Barney Ross (born Dov-Ber Rosofsky), 57, American boxer and U.S. Marine veteran of World War II, died of throat cancer.

== January 19, 1967 (Thursday) ==
- Thirty-nine sailors of the Republic of Korea Navy were killed when their patrol boat, ROKS Dangpo, was sunk by cannon fire from the shores of North Korea. The South Korean ship had ventured into North Korea's coastal waters in an effort to save 70 fishing vessels that had strayed off course. This was the first time that a naval vessel from capitalist South Korea had been sunk by the Communist north.
- Kosmos 138, a Soviet optical film-return reconnaissance satellite, was launched by a Vostok-2 rocket from Site 41/1 at the Plesetsk Cosmodrome.
- Transmissions from the Soviet lunar probe Luna 12 ceased after the satellite had made 602 orbits around the Moon, and 85 days after its launch on October 22, 1966.
- Major Bernard F. Fisher of the United States Air Force became the first person to be awarded the Air Force Medal of Honor, the design of which had been authorized on November 1, 1965. From 1947 to 1965, USAF members who were awarded the highest order of valor in the United States were presented with the Army Medal of Honor. Major Fisher's recognition came for his heroism on March 10, 1966, when he risked his life by landing his A-1E/H Skyraider plane on a short airstrip in the A Shau Valley in South Vietnam to rescue a fellow pilot who was about to be captured by the North Vietnamese Army.

== January 20, 1967 (Friday) ==
- Djaya Christian University (now UKRIDA for the Universitas Kristen Krida Wacana and the Kirda Wacana Foundation) was founded in Jakarta in Indonesia.
- In Canada, accused murderer Mathew Charles Lamb, who had been one of the last persons in Canada to face the death penalty if convicted, was acquitted by a jury as not guilty by reason of insanity. Lamb, who had killed two random people and wounded two others in 1966, would be released in 1973 and then join the Rhodesian Army in Africa. He would be killed by friendly fire on November 7, 1976.
- The government and the central bank of the South American nation of Chile created the "Unidad de Fomento" (UF), a non-circulating unit of account to make quarterly adjustments to the exchange rate of the Chilean escudo (Eº) based on its economists calculation of the changes in the nation's consumer price index. Because of Chile's accelerating inflation, adjustments would begin to be made monthly in 1975 as the currency changed to the Chilean peso (worth 1,000 escudos) against foreign currencies, and then daily starting in July 1977. From 1967 to 1975, the value of the one UF increased from Eº 115 to Eº 94,700
- In the U.S., California Governor Ronald Reagan, who had added his own choices to the Board of Regents of the University of California at Berkeley, called for a vote as one of the ex officio regents of the Board, to dismiss university chancellor Clark Kerr by a vote of 14 to 8. The move came following Reagan's successful campaign for governor, during which he had vowed "to clean up the mess at Berkeley".
- Because of the withdrawal of France from NATO and the removal of all American military operations at France's request, the United States Sixth Fleet relocated its headquarters from the French Mediterranean port of Villefranche-sur-Mer to the Italian port of Gaeta.
- Born: Kellyanne Conway, American lawyer and political commentator who became the first successful female U.S. presidential campaign manager (for Donald Trump in 2016), and later served as the presidential Senior Counselor and spokesperson; in Camden, New Jersey, as Kellyanne Elizabeth Fitzpatrick.
- Died:
  - Giulio Calì, 71, Italian film actor
  - Billy Foster, 29, Canadian racecar driver, was killed in a crash during practice for the 1967 Motor Trend 500 at Riverside International Speedway.

== January 21, 1967 (Saturday) ==
- In the first encounter between a computer and a master-rated chess player in a tournament, the "Mac Hack" computer program designed by Richard Greenblatt of the Massachusetts Institute of Technology program almost defeated another MIT student, Carl Wagner, who was rated at "a little above master" by the United States Chess Federation. Wagner was playing at the monthly chess club tournament at the YMCA building in Boylston, Massachusetts, while the Mac Hack (entered in the tournament as "Robert Q. Computer") remained at MIT while the moves and responses were relayed by teletype.
- Died:
  - Ann Sheridan, 51, American film actress nicknamed "The Oomph Girl", died from esophageal cancer that had metastasized to her liver. Sheridan's last role was as the star of the CBS comedy western, Pistols 'n' Petticoats, where she portrayed widow Henrietta Hanks. The 19th episode, "Beware the Hangman", aired as scheduled on the day that she died.
  - Admiral Tao Yong, 55, Commander of China's East Sea Fleet, committed suicide after being subjected to criticism and physical abuse by the Red Guards during the Cultural Revolution.

== January 22, 1967 (Sunday) ==
- Two weeks before the February 5 national election in Nicaragua, 30,000 supporters of presidential candidate Fernando Aguero turned out for a rally in Managua. When the demonstrators began marching up Roosevelt Avenue, they were fired upon by troops of the repressive Guardia Nacional and more than 100 of the protesters were killed. During the riot, Aguero and about 600 of his followers took refuge in the Grand Hotel, and held 125 of the guests (89 of them visiting Americans) hostage until the Roman Catholic Church and the United States Ambassador could negotiate an agreement for everyone to be freed. The final death count was estimated at more than 200 dead, although the Nicaraguan government gave the official toll as 30 civilians and four members of the Guardia. As expected, Anastasio Somoza Debayle, a member of the Somoza family that had controlled the government since 1937, defeated Aguero in the election.
- Soviet dissident leader Vladimir Bukovsky organized a protest demonstration in Moscow's Pushkin Square, with marchers carrying banners decrying the suppression of free speech, particularly two recent revisions in the Russian Republic's criminal code. Bukovsky, who was arrested along with fellow dissidents Vadim Delaunay, Yevgeny Kushev and Victor Khaustov, would use the resulting trial as an opportunity to challenge whether the totalitarian Soviet government could reconcile its acts against the stated guarantees of Article 125 of the Soviet constitution, which promised freedom of speech and freedom of assembly.
- Six gunboats from the People's Republic of China pulled into the harbor at Macao, which at the time was a colony of Portugal near mainland China and under a 99-year lease. Thousands of residents watched as the vessels moved into the inner harbor between Macao and the island of Taipa, to see whether a Communist invasion was imminent, but the gunboats departed after an hour of intimidation. The colony would revert to China's control in 1999.
- The Pro Bowl, the National Football League's seventeenth annual all-star game, was played in a heavy rainstorm at the Los Angeles Memorial Coliseum in the week after the Super Bowl. Slightly more than 15,000 people showed up in the 93,000-seat stadium.
- The National Congress of Brazil voted, 221 to 110, to approve a new constitution, the sixth in that nation's history, which would restrict legislative powers in favor of a stronger executive branch, effective March 15.
- Heavy rains began in Brazil, causing the Paraíba do Sul river to overflow its banks and leading to flash floods that killed hundreds of people.
- Born: Ecaterina Szabo, Romanian gymnast and winner of four Olympic gold medals in 1984; in Zagon
- Died: Charles A. Buckley, 76, U.S. Representative for New York for 30 years, from 1935 to 1965

== January 23, 1967 (Monday) ==
- For the first time since the Headquarters of the United Nations had been opened in New York City in 1952, the New York Police Department began the ticketing and towing away of illegally parked diplomatic vehicles, by order of Mayor John V. Lindsay. On the first day that the tow-away program started to include the cars of the world's UN representatives, diplomats from the Soviet Union, West Germany, Ecuador, Turkey, Mauritania and Ghana discovered that their vehicles had been taken to pier 74 at Manhattan's 34th Street.
- In Munich, the trial began of former SS-General Wilhelm Harster, who stood accused of the murder of 82,856 Jews (including Anne Frank) during his tenure as chief of German security police during the Nazi German occupation of the Netherlands. Facing trial with Harster were former SS Major Wilhelm Zoepf, who operated the "Jewish Department" in The Hague during the Nazi occupation, and Harster's former secretary, Gertrud Slottke. Harster would be sentenced to 15 years in prison.
- A border conflict broke out between the Soviet Union and the People's Republic of China in a territorial dispute over an island in the Ussuri River. Each side accused the other of provocation and confrontations at what the Chinese referred to as Zhenbao Island ("Chen-pao Island") and the Soviets called Damansky Island. The dispute would culminate in a battle in 1969 and be resolved 24 years later with an agreement allowing China to control the territory.
- The U.S. Supreme Court struck down a New York state law that prohibited members of any Communist Party organization from teaching in public schools, in a 5–4 decision in Keyishian v. Board of Regents, holding that the "Feinberg Law" (and others similar to it) violated the right of freedom of association guaranteed by the First Amendment to the U.S. Constitution.
- NASA announced that Apollo 1, first of the American space shots to have three astronauts, would be launched on February 21, with Gus Grissom commanding, and Ed White and Roger Chaffee as the other two crewmembers. Under the schedule, the Apollo 1 capsule would orbit the Earth while the crew spent up to 14 days testing all systems on the new ship.
- Milton Keynes, a planned city in England's Buckinghamshire County, was formally designated as one of the "new towns" to be created under the 1965 revision to the New Towns Act 1946. More than 40 years later, it would have a population of more than 200,000 and would continue to be one of the United Kingdom's fastest growing cities.
- As heavy rains continued to fall in Brazil around Rio de Janeiro, flooding cut off the 90-mile (140 km) long highway to São Paulo. A bus, carrying 37 people from Rio to São Paulo, was swept away by the flood waters into the Paraíba do Sul river, and only seven people survived.
- Born:
  - Robert Golob, Prime Minister of Slovenia and leader of the Freedom Movement since 2022; in Šempeter pri Gorici, SR Slovenia, SFR Yugoslavia
  - Naim Süleymanoğlu, Bulgarian-born weightlifter who defected to Turkey and won gold medals in three Olympics; in Ptichar, Kardzhali Province (d. 2017)
  - Magdalena Andersson, Prime Minister of Sweden from 2021 to 2022; in Uppsala, Uppland

== January 24, 1967 (Tuesday) ==
- U.S. President Johnson presented a record $135 billion budget to Congress for approval for fiscal year 1968. The $135,033,000,000 sought reflected the largest request for military spending since World War II ($72,300,000,000) and $18.3 billion in social programs, to be paid for by an additional ten billion dollars in individual income taxes.
- In a closed meeting with his National Security Council, President Johnson increased pressure on North Vietnam by authorizing the bombing of 16 "critical targets" around Hanoi.
- Born: Phil LaMarr, American actor, comedian, and screenwriter; in Los Angeles
- Died: Luigi Federzoni, 88, Italian Fascist politician who served as President of the Italian Senate from 1929 to 1939, during the premiership of Benito Mussolini

== January 25, 1967 (Wednesday) ==
- Representatives of Israel and Syria met on the Syrian side of the border along with observers from the United Nations Truce Supervision Organization, for their first discussions of a settlement in the demilitarized zones between their two nations, in order to allow "farming and grazing by both sides without harassment". Moshe Sasson, of the Armistice Committee Department of the Israeli Ministry of Foreign Affairs, drove with his delegation across the Bnot Yaakov Bridge that spanned the Jordan River to the customs house, where "the hosts did not even serve water to their guests." A second meeting would be held four days later on the Israeli side.
- In the Kuwaiti general election, pro-government candidates won 20 of the 50 available seats in the National Assembly, while independents had 17 and Shi'ite Muslim candidates had 8. Voting was limited to men only, and 17,590 voters (65.6%) participated.
- Lt. General Nguyen Huu Co was dismissed from his positions as Deputy Premier and Defense Minister of South Vietnam, and removed from his place in the military junta governing the nation, by vote of the other junta members.

== January 26, 1967 (Thursday) ==
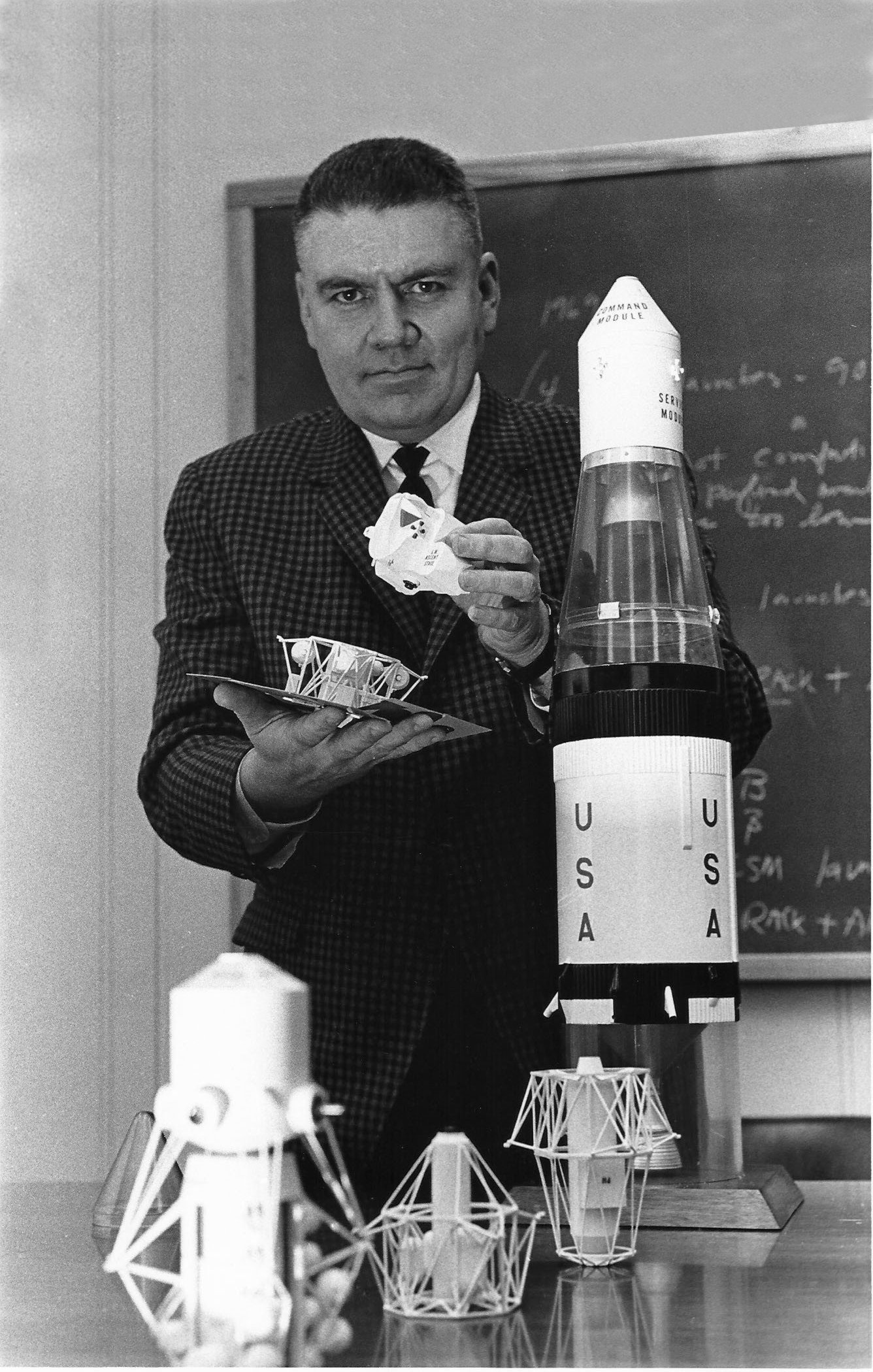
January 26, 1967: John H. Disher explaining components of a planned American space station

- The road leading to the main gates of the Soviet Union's embassy to China in Beijing was blocked by a mob of thousands of demonstrators, including students, Red Guards and soldiers, who carried banners, painted slogans on the streets, put anti-Soviet posters on the embassy compound's outer walls, and shouted protests against "Soviet pigs" and "Soviet revisionism". The crowds also threatened journalists from other nations, referring to the foreigners as "the long noses". Over the next 20 days, Soviet diplomats and embassy employees stayed inside the compound because of fears of violence from the mobs. According to a reporter for the Reuters news service, the demonstration "was assumed by observers [in Beijing]... to be China's answer to a Soviet protest note about a Moscow incident [the day before] involving Chinese students and Moscow police."
- The House of Commons voted 306 to 220 to nationalize the British steel industry for the second time in United Kingdom history. The first nationalization had been approved by the Labour government in 1950, then denationalized in 1952 during the second administration of Winston Churchill. The new bill affected 90% of the British steel industry.
- George E. Mueller, NASA's Associate Administrator for Manned Space Flight, announced plans to form an "embryonic space station" during 1968 and 1969 by clustering four Apollo Applications Program (AAP) payloads launched at different times. The mission would be given with the launch of astronauts on the first spacecraft, followed several days later by a spent S-IVB rocket stage converted into an Orbital Workshop (OWS). After docking of the spacecraft and entry by the crew through an airlock into the OWS, the astronauts would spend 28 days passivating the new Workshop, undock, and to Earth in their spacecraft. At least three later, a second set of astronauts would begin a 56-day mission to deliver a resupply module to the OWS and to rendezvous with the uncrewed Apollo Telescope Mount (ATM), the fourth and last launch. The cluster of three spacecraft (the orbital workshop, the telescope mount and the travel vehicle) would be joined using the multiple docking adapter. Mueller commented "if there is one thing the scientific community is agreed on, it is that when you want to have a major telescope instrument in space, it needs to be manned."

== January 27, 1967 (Friday) ==
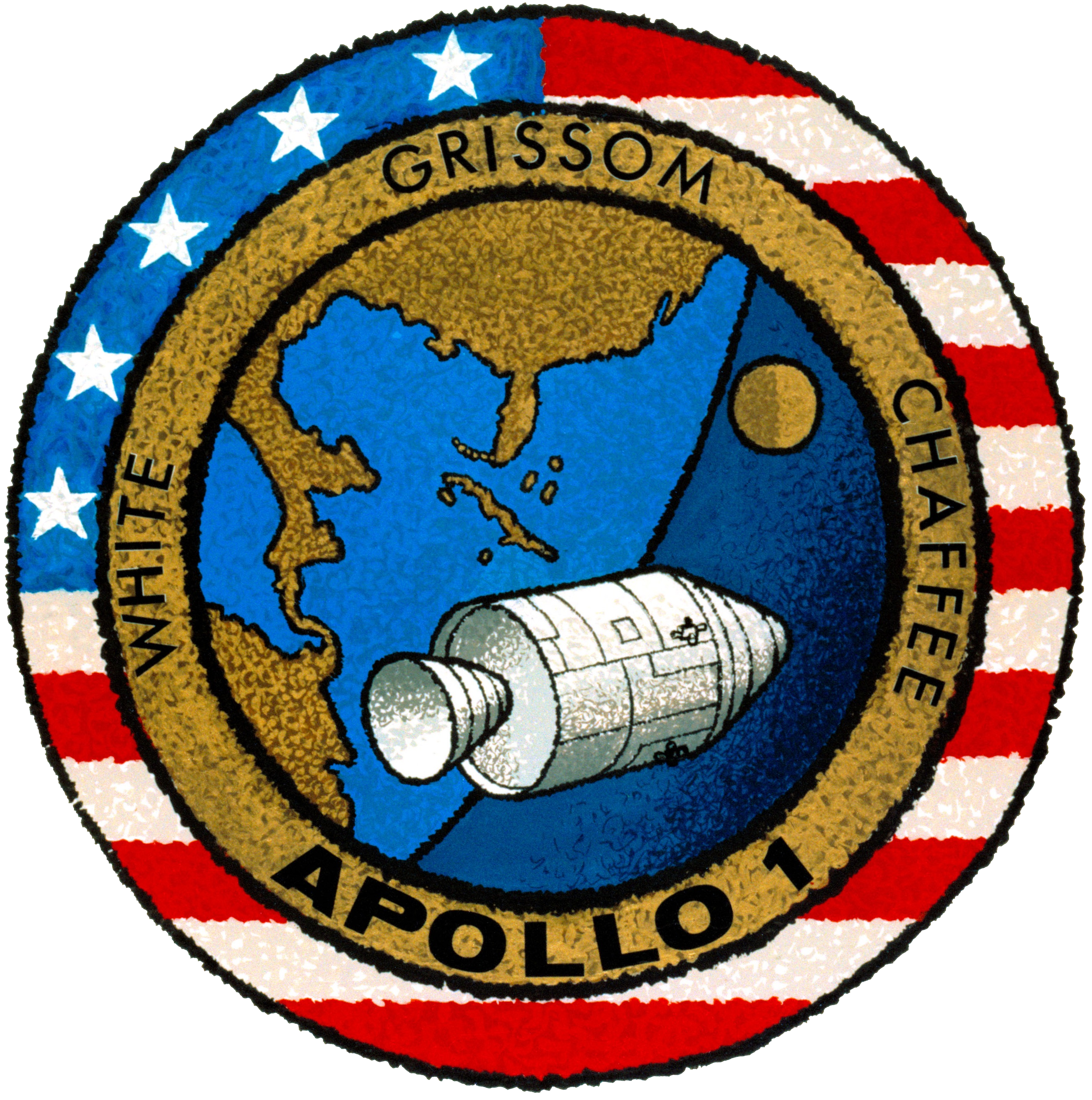
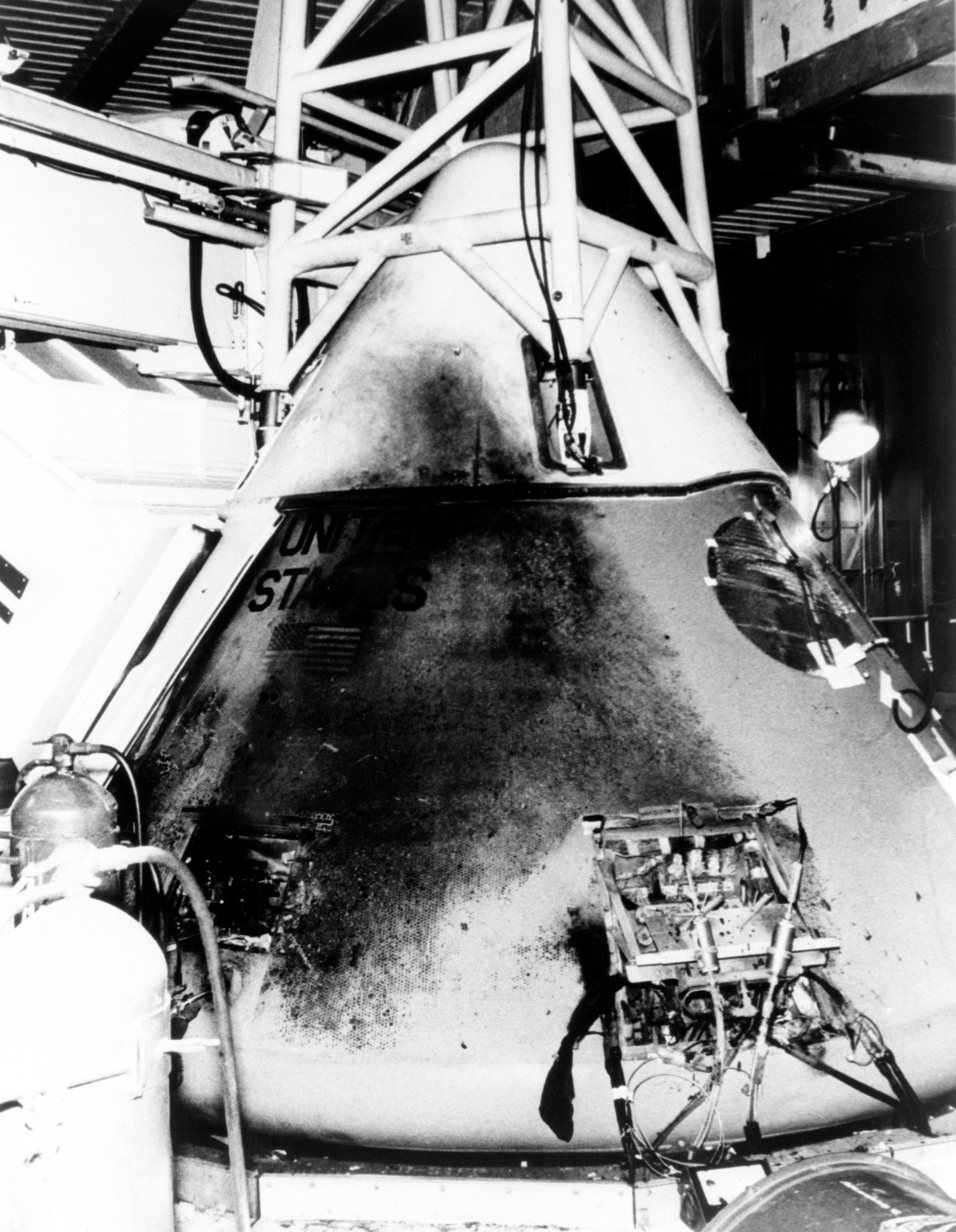
The Apollo 1 command module after the fire
- Apollo 1 was destroyed by fire at Launch Complex 34 at Cape Kennedy, killing all three of the American astronauts on board. Killed in the blaze were Command Pilot Gus Grissom, Senior Pilot Ed White, and Pilot Roger B. Chaffee. At 6:31 in the evening, the three men were inside the capsule of the Saturn rocket, engaged in a full-scale simulation of the planned February 21 launch, and were wearing their pressurized space suits while in a pure oxygen atmosphere. A spark from a short-circuited wire ignited a flash fire that swept the cabin moments after it was noticed by Grissom. Ten seconds after a voltage spike was recorded, "a spark ignited nylon netting beneath Grissom's left couch" with the pure oxygen and flammable material allowing the flames to burn quickly. Within 17 seconds after the fire was first noticed, pressure from the expansion of gases had ruptured the command module. White had tried to open the hatch door, which had to be pulled inward, but the internal pressure would have kept it closed; Grissom had been able to remove himself from his chair and was found on the floor, and Chaffee was still strapped in his seat. America's manned space program would be grounded for 20 months for improvements, which would include an atmosphere of 60% oxygen and 40% nitrogen on future missions and a cockpit hatch that could be opened within seconds.
- Earlier in the day, in Moscow, the United States, the Soviet Union and the United Kingdom signed the Outer Space Treaty, jointly agreeing not to use outer space or the Moon for military purposes. Soviet Foreign Minister Andrei Gromyko signed for the Soviet Union, while the American and British ambassadors to the USSR (Llewellyn Thompson and Sir Geoffrey Harrison) signed on behalf of the U.S. and the UK. By the time of the treaty's entry into force on October 10, it would be signed by 93 nations and ratified by 16; by 2008, there were 99 nations that had ratified the treaty.
- Died:
  - Luigi Tenco, 28, Italian singer-songwriter, died from an apparent self-inflicted gunshot wound after failing to reach the finals of the Sanremo Music Festival for his song "Ciao amore, ciao".
  - Marshal Alphonse Juin, 78, French Army officer and the last living Marshal of France
  - David Fyfe, 66, former Home Secretary and Lord High Chancellor of Great Britain

== January 28, 1967 (Saturday) ==
- In the biggest upset in the history of Scottish soccer football, Berwick Rangers defeated Rangers F.C. of Glasgow, 1–0, in a first round match for the Scottish Cup, played at Shielfield Park in Berwick-upon-Tweed in Northumberland. At the time, Rangers F.C. was the defending Scottish Cup champion and was unbeaten (9 wins and 1 tie) in First Division play, while Berwick was in 10th place in the Scottish League's Second Division, at 6 wins, 4 losses and tie. "Never in the history of Scottish football has there been a result to match this one," the Glasgow Herald wrote on Monday about the champs being knocked out of the tournament, "and because Rangers are Rangers it will inevitably lead to serious repercussions."
- Died: Bechor-Shalom Sheetrit, 71, Israeli Minister of the Police since the nation's founding in 1948, and the only "Sabra" (Israeli citizen born in Palestine) to have signed Israel's declaration of independence.

== January 29, 1967 (Sunday) ==
- One week after the first threats from China against the Portuguese colony of Macao, Colonial Governor José Manuel de Sousa e Faro Nobre de Carvalho signed an "admission of guilt" to apologize for the killing of eight Chinese students during a riot on December 3. Another historian would comment that "the Portuguese governor of Macao felt compelled to sign an agreement that all but formally turned over political power to Macao's Maoists." Under the agreement, the colony would also send back any refugees from the People's Republic to face the consequences of fleeing the country.
- In Portland, The Oregonian and its afternoon edition, The Oregon Journal, closed out their run as the last metropolitan newspapers in America to sell for only five cents, the price that had been charged since 1883. Effective the following Monday, both papers doubled their price to the ten cents charged by many others in the United States.
- The Mantra-Rock Dance concert was held at the Avalon Ballroom in San Francisco. The event featured some of the most prominent rock groups of the time, such as the Grateful Dead, Big Brother and the Holding Company, and the then unknown band Moby Grape.
- The demarcation of the boundary between Jordan and Saudi Arabia was completed after a Japanese surveying company, hired by both nations, finished the placement of border markers in accordance with the treaty of August 9, 1965.
- The Arusha Declaration was promulgated in Tanzania, as the embodiment of the doctrine of President Julius Nyerere's vision of Ujamaa, a political philosophy of African socialism.
- In the Japanese general election, the ruling Liberal Democratic Party retained a majority control of Japan's parliament, the Diet, winning 277 out of 486 seats.
- The Northern Ireland Civil Rights Association (NICRA) was founded at a meeting in the International Hotel in Belfast.
- Born: Khalid Skah, Moroccan track and field athlete and 1992 Olympic gold medalist for the men's 10,000-meter race; in Midelt

== January 30, 1967 (Monday) ==
- Nikolai Podgorny became the highest official of the Soviet Union to receive a formal audience with a Roman Catholic Pope. Podgorny, the President of the Presidium and the USSR's official head of state, met for 70 minutes with Pope Paul VI at the Pope's private residence in Vatican City to discuss "the preservation of peace" and "the present condition of the Roman Catholic church in the Soviet Union". Foreign Minister Andrei Gromyko, who had visited on April 27, 1966, would meet with Paul VI again on November 14, 1970, and on February 21, 1974, and later with Pope John Paul II on January 24, 1979.
- In the United Kingdom, the final section of the North Cornwall Railway, between Bodmin and Wadebridge, was closed as a result of the Beeching cuts.
- Died: Eddie Tolan, 58, American track and field athlete and 1932 Olympic gold medalist in the 100-meter and 200-meter dash, died from heart failure while he was undergoing kidney dialysis.

== January 31, 1967 (Tuesday) ==
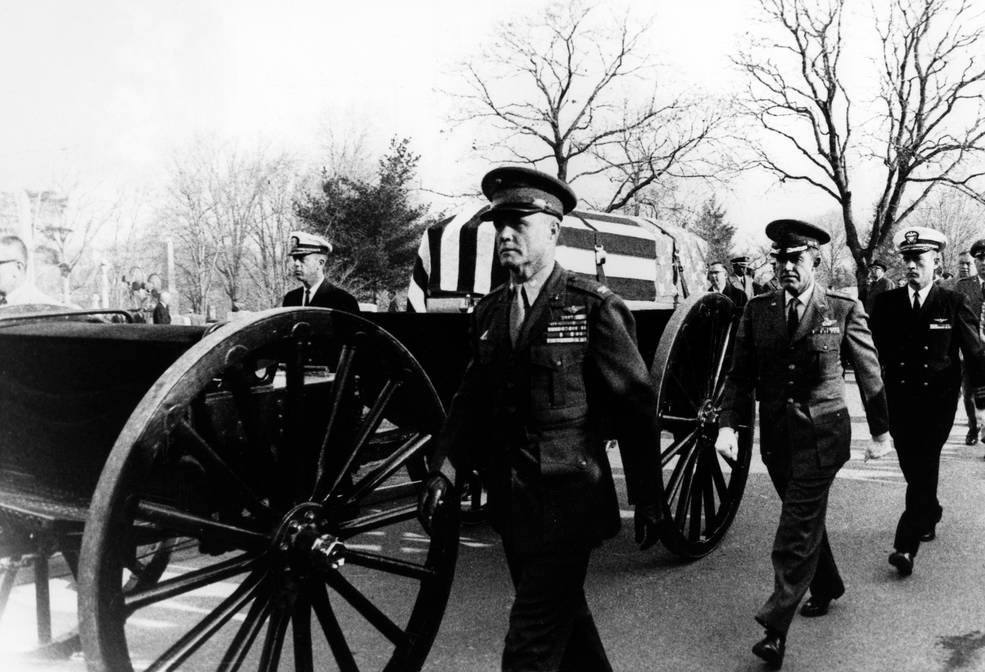
January 31, 1967: Flag-draped coffin of Gus Grissom escorted by his fellow astronauts

- The Apollo 1 astronauts were buried, Gus Grissom and Roger Chaffee at Arlington National Cemetery and Ed White at West Point. NASA officials had attempted to pressure Pat White, Ed White's widow, into allowing her husband also to be buried at Arlington, against what she knew to be his wishes; their efforts were foiled by astronaut Frank Borman.
- Only four days after the deaths of the Apollo 1 astronauts, two airmen at the United States Air Force School of Aerospace Medicine at San Antonio were killed in a similar accident, burned to death by a flash fire spread by a pure oxygen atmosphere while they sat inside a space cabin simulator. Airman 2nd Class William F. Bartley, Jr. and Airman 3rd Class Richard G. Harmon had been doing maintenance inside the simulator for an experiment. Both were rescued, but died of their burns within hours.
- The United Nations opened the Protocol Relating to the Status of Refugees for signature. For purposes of UN aid, the new treaty (which would enter into effect on October 4) defined a refugee as "A person who owing to a well-founded fear of being persecuted for reasons of race, religion, nationality, membership of a particular social group or political opinion, is outside the country of his nationality and is unable or, owing to such fear, is unwilling to avail himself of the protection of that country; or who, not having a nationality and being outside the country of his former habitual residence as a result of such events, is unable or, owing to such fear, is unwilling to return to it."
- West Germany and Romania established diplomatic relations. The decision was made following a two day meeting in Bonn between Foreign Minister (and later West German Chancellor) Willy Brandt and his Romanian counterpart, Corneliu Mănescu. West Germany opened relations with Yugoslavia on the same day, the only other state besides Romania to respond to Chancellor Ludwig Erhard's invitation to Communist nations in 1965.
- Born:
  - Randy Bernard, American businessman and sports promoter for IndyCar and for Professional Bull Riders; in Paso Robles, California
  - Diane Whipple, American lacrosse coach; in Princeton, New Jersey (died from fatal dog attack, 2001)
