= Association of Northern Deputies =

Defunct political party in Laos

The Association of Northern Deputies was a political party in Laos.

== History ==
Originally known as the Vientiane Group, the party won nine seats in the 1965 elections, and also did well in the 1967 elections, after which it was renamed the Association of Northern Deputies. MPs from other regions of the country joined it and the party formed an alliance with the Lao Neutralist Party, supporting Prime Minister Souvanna Phouma's government.
