= Youth Party =

Youth Party may refer to:

- Chinese Youth Party
- Croatian Youth Party
- Egypt Youth Party
- Great Japan Youth Party
- Indonesian Youth Party
- Rally for Independent Forces/Party of the Youth of Burkina
- Socialist Youth (Portugal)
- Syrian National Youth Party
- Young Party, a political party in Turkey
- Youth Movement (Laos), also known as the Youth Party
- Youth Congress Party
- Youth International Party
- Youth Party of Ukraine
- Youth Party – European Greens, a political party in Slovenia
- Malaysian United Democratic Alliance, also known as Parti MUDA (Muda in malay meaning youth)

== See also ==
- Youth wing
