= Lewis v. United States =

Lewis v. United States may refer to the following United States Supreme Court cases:

- Lewis v. United States (1875)
- Lewis v. United States (1892)
- Lewis v. United States (1910)
- Lewis v. United States (1917)
- Lewis v. United States (1929)
- Lewis v. United States (1955)
- Lewis v. United States (1966)
- Lewis v. United States (1980)
- Lewis v. United States (1998)

== See also ==
- Lists of United States Supreme Court cases
- Lists of United States Supreme Court cases by volume
