= Law Enforcement Officers' Bill of Rights =

American police proposal

The Law Enforcement Officers' Bill of Rights (LEBOR, LEOBR, or LEOBoR) is a set of rights intended to protect American law enforcement personnel from investigation and prosecution arising from conduct during the official performance of their duties, through procedural safeguards. It provides them with privileges beyond those normally provided to other citizens. It was first set forth in 1974, following Supreme Court rulings in the cases of Garrity v. New Jersey (1967) and Gardner v. Broderick (1968). It does not prohibit police departments from subjecting officers to drug tests.

Fifteen states have versions of the bill written into their statutes. An additional eleven states are considering similar legislation, and many other states have similar provisions written into their contracts with police unions.

Critics say that the LEOBR makes it impossible to discipline or remove bad officers, such as after they have been convicted of felonies in the courts. Under LEOBR, officers are judged only by other officers. LEOBR prevents the formation of independent review boards that provide independent oversight over police actions.

== Details ==
The LEOBR detailed by the Grand Lodge of the Fraternal Order of Police as follows:

- Law enforcement officers, except when on duty or acting in an official capacity, have the right to engage in political activity or run for elective office.
- Law enforcement officers shall, if disciplinary action is expected, be notified of the investigation, the nature of the alleged violation, and be notified of the outcome of the investigation and the recommendations made to superiors by the investigators.
- Questioning of a law enforcement officer should be conducted for a reasonable length of time and preferably while the officer is on duty unless exigent circumstances apply.
- Questioning of the law enforcement officer should take place at the offices of those conducting the investigation or at the place where the officer reports to work, unless the officer consents to another location.
- Law enforcement officers will be questioned by a single investigator, and he or she shall be informed of the name, rank, and command of the officer conducting the investigation.
- Law enforcement officers under investigation are entitled to have counsel or any other individual of their choice present at the interrogation.
- Law enforcement officers cannot be threatened, harassed, or promised rewards to induce the answering of any question.
- Law enforcement officers are entitled to a hearing, with notification in advance of the date, access to transcripts, and other relevant documents and evidence generated by the hearing and to representation by counsel or another non-attorney representative at the hearing.
- Law enforcement officers shall have the opportunity to comment in writing on any adverse materials placed in his or her personnel file.
- Law enforcement officers cannot be subject to retaliation for the exercise of these or any other rights under Federal, or State.

As of April 2015, the following U.S. states have enacted legislation to codify their own variations of a Law Enforcement Officers' Bill of Rights:

- California
- Delaware
- Florida
- Illinois
- Kentucky
- Louisiana
- Minnesota
- Nevada
- New Mexico
- Rhode Island
- Tennessee
- Texas
- Virginia
- West Virginia
- Wisconsin

== Criticism ==
In Rhode Island, police officers can be convicted of felonies in civilian criminal courts, and still keep their jobs after a hearing before panels of fellow police officers, according to Mike Riggs of Reason. However a convicted felon cannot be in possession of firearms or ammunition per federal law. The laws vary by states, but in most states, the officer gets a "cooling off" period before she or he has to respond to any questions. Unlike a member of the public, the officer under investigation is privy to the names of his complainants and their testimony against him before he is ever interrogated. The officer can only be questioned by one person during his interrogation, and only "for reasonable periods," which "shall be timed to allow for such personal necessities and rest periods as are reasonably necessary." The officer under investigation cannot be "threatened with disciplinary action" at any point during his interrogation. If he is threatened with punishment, whatever he says following the threat cannot be used against her or him. The officer continues to receive full pay and benefits. A violation of any rights can result in dismissal of the charges against the officer.

In nearly every state, their departments cannot publicly acknowledge that the officer is under investigation, wrote Riggs. If the charges are dropped, the department may not publicly acknowledge that the investigation ever took place, or reveal the nature of the complaint.

The officer can only be questioned or investigated by sworn officers. This prohibits independent review boards, or any review by anyone other than police officers. This results in other officers acting as judge and jury rather than a neutral third party.

Maryland's version of the LEOBR was brought up as a reason why a police officer caught fabricating evidence and framing people on video in 2018 remained on the force collecting a paycheck in 2020, two and a half years later. While the police officer, Richard Pinheiro Jr., was convicted of a crime and the prosecutor's office announced it would not call him in court due to credibility problems, police officials cited the LEOBR as a reason why Pinheiro could not be speedily fired. In 2021, Maryland then repealed their version of the LEOBR, overriding Governor Larry Hogan's veto.
