= Spevack v. Klein =

- Supreme Court of the United States

Argued November 7, 1966 Decided January 16, 1967
- Full case name: Samuel Spevack v. Solomon A. Klein
- Citations: 385 U.S. 511 (more)
- Argument: Oral argument

Case history
- Prior: 17 N.Y.2d 490, 214 N.E.2d 373, 16 N.Y.2d 1048, 213 N.E.2d 457, Matter of Spevack, 24 A.D.2d 653 (N.Y. App. Div. 1965)

Holding
- The Self-incrimination Clause of the Fifth Amendment applies to an attorney invoking it against a state through a state bar association, and its assertion cannot be grounds for disbarment.

Court membership
- Chief Justice Earl Warren Associate Justices Hugo Black · William O. Douglas; Tom C. Clark · John M. Harlan II; William J. Brennan Jr. · Potter Stewart; Byron White · Abe Fortas

Case opinions
- Plurality: Douglas, joined by Warren, Black, Brennan, Fortas
- Concurrence: Fortas (in judgment)
- Dissent: Harlan, joined by Clark, Stewart
- Dissent: White

Laws applied
- V Amendment, Self-incrimination Clause
- This case overturned a previous ruling or rulings
- Cohen v. Hurley, 366 U.S. 117 (1961)

Spevack v. Klein, 385 U.S. 511 (1967) was a Supreme Court of the United States case in which the court held in a plurality decision that the Self-incrimination Clause of the Fifth Amendment applied even to attorneys in a state bar association under investigation, and an attorney asserting that right may not be disbarred for invoking it. It was a very close case, being 5–4, with the majority only winning with the vote of Justice Abe Fortas who wrote a special concurring opinion on the matter. This case directly overruled Cohen v. Hurley, 366 U.S. 117 (1961), a nearly identical case in which the Supreme Court had just recently upheld an attorney's disbarment for his refusal to testify or produce documents in regards to an investigation. This case has since spawned much debate, with some arguing this decision "signaled the decline of bar disciplinary enforcement".

== Background ==
Around 1965, attorney Samuel Spevack of the New York State Bar Association was under investigation and was served with a subpoena to produce various financial and business documents. Spevack denied, citing his Fifth Amendment right and that turning the documents over might incriminate him. With his refusal to comply, the state bar association charged him with professional misconduct, and was ordered disbarred by the Appellate Division of the New York Supreme Court, Second Division to take effect on December 1, 1965. Solomon A. Klein throughout these proceedings was the named respondent, this was due to him having been the Chief Counsel to the Judiciary Inquiry on Professional Conduct of the New York State Supreme Court.

=== New York Court of Appeals ===
Spevack appealed the ruling to the New York Court of Appeals which heard arguments on November 23, 1965. The court made its decision on December 1, the same day Spevack was to be disbarred, and ultimately based on the recent Cohen decision, upheld the disbarment and held that no violation of rights had occurred. Its decision had rested on Cohen and that,

"the Fifth Amendment privilege does not apply to a demand, not for oral testimony, but that an attorney produce records required by law to be kept by him" (citing Davis v. United States, 328 U.S. 582 and Shapiro v. United States, 335 U.S. 1).

Judge Stanley H. Fuld, who went on to become the Chief Judge of the New York Court of Appeals in 1967, wrote a concurring memorandum in which he expressed disdain in this case, showing he disagreed with Cohen decision but was bound by it.

== Supreme Court ==
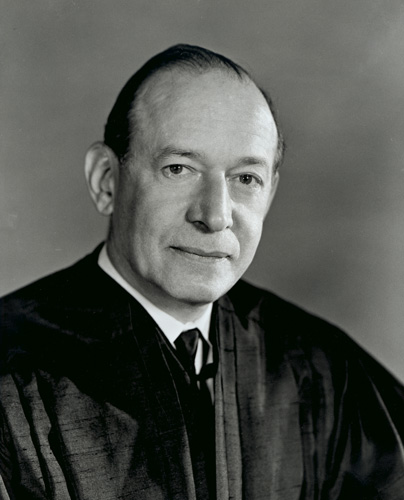
Justice Abe Fortas voted for the majority and wrote a separate concurring opinion in Spevack v. Klein.

Spevack appealed once more to the Supreme Court, which granted certiorari, and oral arguments took place on November 7, 1966, and decided on January 16, 1967. In a very close 5–4 decision the court, with a plurality and not a majority, ruled in favor of Spevack. The court reached its plurality with the vote of Justice Abe Fortas, who agreed with the general idea of attorneys having a Fifth Amendment right in this case but maintained that public employees did not enjoy that same right.

=== Majority opinion ===
The majority opinion was written by Justice William O. Douglas, and was joined by Justice Hugo Black, Justice Earl Warren, and Justice William Brennan. All of these Justices voted for an attorney's Fifth Amendment right in the Cohen case. Their opinion rests on a strong interpretation of incorporation of the Fifth Amendment, saying,

"it is in that tradition that we overrule Cohen v. Hurley. We find no room in the privilege against self-incrimination for classifications of people so as to deny it to some and extend it to others. Lawyers are not excepted from the words "No person . . . shall be compelled in any criminal case to be a witness against himself"; and we can imply no exception."

The opinion strengthened the case of Malloy v. Hogan, 378 US 1 (1964) which incorporated the right against self-incrimination against the states. It argued the Appellate Division had relied on the Cohen case instead of Hogan because Spevack was a member of the bar and thus Cohen did not apply, an interpretation the majority did not agree with. In Hogan, it was reinforced that no person should be punished for their silence by virtue of their Fifth Amendment right, protected and incorporated by the Fourteenth, and the majority determined that the threat of disbarment and its eventual execution was a violation of that precedent. They argued,

"The threat of disbarment and the loss of professional standing, professional reputation, and of livelihood are powerful forms of compulsion to make a lawyer relinquish the privilege."

This case has allowed attorneys to enjoy greater protections within their businesses and livelihoods by being able to assert their Fifth Amendment right within investigations.

=== Fortas' concurrence ===
Justice Abe Fortas wrote a concurring opinion in this case, agreeing with the outcome but wishing for the plurality to specify that this case and ruling would not afford public employees a self-incrimination right if they were under investigation. He argues,

"I agree that [Cohen], should be overruled. But I would distinguish between a lawyer's right to remain silent and that of a public employee who is asked questions specifically, directly, and narrowly relating to the performance of his official duties, as distinguished from his beliefs or other matters that are not within the scope of the specific duties which he undertook faithfully to perform as part of his employment by the State."

He in essence agreed with the majority due to the simple fact he believed,

"a lawyer is not an employee of the State. He does not have the responsibility of an employee to account to the State for his actions, because he does not perform them as agent of the State. His responsibility to the State is to obey its laws and the rules of conduct that it has generally laid down as part of its licensing procedures."

=== Harlan's dissent ===
The first dissent in this case was written by Justice John Marshall Harlan II, joined by Justice Tom Clark, and Justice Potter Stewart. These same Justices also voted against an attorney's Fifth Amendment right in Cohen. Their argument rests on an idea that this decision would be a great loss to public trust, bar associations, and the legal profession at large as it will be,

"frustrating to courts and bar associations throughout the country in their efforts to maintain high standards at the bar."

They further argue that this decision would be devastating to the legal profession in the public eye, since attorneys and would-be applicants can claim Fifth Amendment protection to shield themselves from any proper investigation. This is put together by saying,

"[This case] exposes this Court itself to the possible indignity that it may one day have to admit to its own bar such a lawyer unless it can somehow get at the truth of suspicions, the investigation of which the applicant has previously succeeded in blocking. For I can perceive no distinction between "admission" and "disbarment" in the rationale of what is now held."

They further reason that even with the Hogan decision, the Court need not be so hasty in completely overturning Cohen, and further that the plurality didn't have deep enough thought or consideration at the "true issue", that being,

"whether petitioner's disbarment for his failure to provide information relevant to charges of misconduct in carrying on his law practice impermissibly vitiated the protection afforded by the privilege."

They argue that the interpretation of the Fifth Amendment federally largely stems from either a historical standpoint or modern and current public interests or urgency, and thus its incorporation against the states need not deviate from that same interpretation. They argue that this case doesn't satisfy either prerequisite, and further continue to speak on the fact that States, through their bar associations, are given a large amount of leeway in what they can require for their professions. They point to three cases, saying,

"The States may demand any qualifications which have "a rational connection with the applicant's fitness or capacity," Schware v. Board of Bar Examiners, 353 U. S. 232, 353 U. S. 239, and may exclude any applicant who fails to satisfy them. In particular, a State may require evidence of good character, and may place the onus of its production upon the applicant. Konigsberg v. State Bar of California, 366 U. S. 36. Finally, a State may, without constitutional objection, require in the same fashion continuing evidence of professional and moral fitness as a condition of the retention of the right to practice. Cohen v. Hurley, 366 U. S. 117. All this is in no way questioned by today's decision."

=== White's dissent ===
Justice Byron White offered a separate dissenting opinion, instead choosing to rely on Garrity v. New Jersey, 385 U.S. 493 (1967), a case they had ruled on in the same exact term as the case at hand. His argument is summed up by him saying,

"Admittedly, however, in attempting to determine the present qualifications of an employee by consultation with the employee himself, the State may ask for information which, if given, would not only result in a discharge, but would be very useful evidence in a criminal proceeding. Garrity, in my view, protects against the latter possibility. Consequently, I see no reason for refusing to permit the State to pursue its other valid interest and to discharge an employee who refuses to cooperate in the State's effort to determine his qualifications for continued employment."

== Legal public perception ==
Since the ruling there has been much debate on this topic, with many of the legal community speaking out against the ruling.

One outspoken critic of the ruling was the widely known Michael Franck, a former director of the State Bar of Michigan and leading figure within the American Bar Association. Franck wrote "The Myth of Spevack v. Klein" as part of the American Bar Association's Journal just a year after the decision was handed down. The scathing article was written largely from the perspective of someone involved greatly from within a bar association, mainly talking about how public perception of the legal profession would fall following the ruling. He wrote,

"If, as the Court has held, the furnishing of an attorney is an essential part of the administration of justice for which the state is responsible, it would seem to follow that the state is at least as interested in the integrity of the attorneys it licenses as in the integrity of its employees"

There has however been some opinions to show that the ruling wasn't completely wrong, with specifically one article arguing that Spevack doesn't wish to regard a bar disciplinary hearing as criminal, which is generally the only context in which the Fifth Amendment may be invoked. One article written by President of the New York City Bar Association Russell D. Niles and former Chief Judge for the New York Court of Appeals Judith Kaye somewhat defends the reasoning of the ruling, saying,

"Spevack suggests to some that the Court would now regard a disciplinary proceeding as criminal and not, as long accepted, civil...The Court is only saying that it regards a disciplinary proceeding as an extremely serious matter which, in its result, may be more like a criminal conviction than like a civil judgment. A lawyer being disciplined must therefore be adequately protected; he must have due process of law. This is not to say that the essential nature of the proceeding must be changed from civil to criminal; grievance procedures do in fact include the highest safeguards."
