= Southern Bloc =

Southern Bloc may refer to:

- Lao Development Association, a political party originally known as the Southern Bloc
- Southern Bloc (South Sudan), a parliamentary faction in the Sudanese parliament formed by parties from southern Sudan
- Southern Bloc of the FARC-EP, a bloc of FARC in Colombia
- Solid South, the electoral voting bloc of the states of the Southern United States
