= Whitus v. Georgia =

- Supreme Court of the United States

Argued December 7, 1966 Decided January 23, 1967
- Full case name: Whitus, et al. v. Georgia
- Citations: 385 U.S. 545 (more) 87 S. Ct. 643; 17 L. Ed. 2d 599; 1967 U.S. LEXIS 2452

Case history
- Prior: Whitus v. State, 222 Ga. 103, 149 S.E.2d 130 (1966); cert. granted, 385 U.S. 813 (1966).

Holding
- Convictions cannot stand if based on indictments or verdicts of juries on which racial discrimination has occurred.

Court membership
- Chief Justice Earl Warren Associate Justices Hugo Black · William O. Douglas; Tom C. Clark · John M. Harlan II; William J. Brennan Jr. · Potter Stewart; Byron White · Abe Fortas

Case opinion
- Majority: Clark, joined by unanimous

Whitus v. Georgia, 385 U.S. 545 (1967), found in favor of the petitioner (Whitus), who had been convicted for murder, and as such reversed their convictions. This was due to the Georgia jury selection policies, in which it was alleged racial discrimination had occurred.

The plaintiffs argued that, as their county had a 45% population of African-Americans, it was discrimination and unfair to have been presented with all-white or nearly all-white juries each time. Thus, the Supreme Court – as well as overturning the convictions – ruled that Georgia renew its jury selection policies. Previous law meant tax returns would be sorted, and "Negroes" would have a '(c)' placed next to their name. In the conviction of Whitus, the jury had been selected via old lists.

== Background ==
After petitioners, who are black, were convicted of murder in the Georgia courts, they filed a writ of habeas corpus in the federal courts, attacking the composition of the grand and petit juries which indicted and convicted them. The District Court dismissed the writ and the Court of Appeals affirmed. This Court vacated that judgment and remanded to the District Court for a hearing on the claim of discrimination ( 370 U.S. 728 ).

== Decision ==
=== Majority opinion ===
The majority opinion of the Court was delivered by Justice Tom C. Clark. Justice Clark states that the appeal is not whether the defendants were wrongfully convicted of murder but if the jury selection purposely excluded the admittance of African Americans from the grand and petit juries. The system of selecting jurors comes from the books of the county tax receiver but questions have been raised about if the system is rigged with notations that signify which males on the tax receiver's list are African American. The court granted certiorari and found the circumstances surrounding the state were sufficient to support the claims of racial discrimination.

=== Decision ===
On January 23, 1967, in a nine to zero unanimous decision, the Supreme Court stated that the case of Whitus v. Georgia should be reversed and the law in question, being the 14th Amendment concerning equal protections, should be upheld and seen as constitutional. From the opinion of Justice Clark, the decision was overturned because the circumstances surrounding the case supported the claims of the petitioners. The claims were claims of discrimination which the Court had realized and therefore reversed the judgement. The Court of Appeals held that African Americans were purposely being excluded from the grand juries and the petit juries. The ruling to reverse the judgment and prove discrimination was based on the finding that 45% of the population was African American yet no African American had ever actually served on a jury.

== Influence ==
The Whitus case influenced court decisions in the future. In McCleskey v. Kemp, petitioner, a black man, was convicted in a Georgia trial court of armed robbery and murder, arising from the killing of a white police officer during the robbery of a store. Pursuant to Georgia statutes, the jury at the penalty hearing considered the mitigating and aggravating circumstances of petitioner's conduct, and recommended the death penalty on the murder charge. The trial court followed the recommendation, and the Georgia Supreme Court affirmed. After unsuccessfully seeking postconviction relief in state courts, petitioner sought habeas corpus relief in Federal District Court. His petition included a claim that the Georgia capital sentencing process was administered in a racially discriminatory manner in violation of the Eighth and Fourteenth Amendments. In support of the claim, petitioner proffered a statistical study (the Baldus study) that purports to show a disparity in the imposition of the death sentence in Georgia based on the murder victim's race and, to a lesser extent, the defendant's race. The study is based on over 2,000 murder cases that occurred in Georgia during the 1970s, and involves data relating to the victim's race, the defendant's race, and the various combinations of such persons' races. The study indicates that black defendants who killed white victims have the greatest likelihood of receiving the death penalty. Rejecting petitioner's constitutional claims, the court denied his petition insofar as it was based on the Baldus study, and the Court of Appeals affirmed the District Court's decision on this issue. It assumed the validity of the Baldus study, but found the statistics insufficient to demonstrate unconstitutional discrimination in the Fourteenth Amendment context or to show irrationality, arbitrariness, and capriciousness under Eighth Amendment analysis. Our analysis begins with the basic principle that a defendant who alleges an equal protection violation has the burden of proving "the existence of purposeful discrimination." Whitus v. Georgia, 385 U.S. 545, 550 (1967).

== See also ==
- List of United States Supreme Court cases, volume 385
