= List of United States Supreme Court cases, volume 385 =

This is a list of all the United States Supreme Court cases from volume 385 of the United States Reports:

Case name	Citation	Date decided
Senfour Inv. Co. v. King Cnty.	385 U.S. 1	1966
Jones v. Ass'n of Bar	385 U.S. 2	1966
Morris Park, Inc. v. Buck	385 U.S. 2	1966
Balt. & Ohio R.R. Co. v. United States (1966)	385 U.S. 3	1966
Buchanan v. Rhodes	385 U.S. 3	1966
Jordan v. Menomonee Falls	385 U.S. 4	1966
Bennett v. United States	385 U.S. 4	1966
Annbar Assocs. v. W. Side Redevelopment Corp.	385 U.S. 5	1966
Glick v. Ballentine Produce, Inc.	385 U.S. 5	1966
Kronsbein v. Tr. of Schs.	385 U.S. 6	1966
Satanta Joint Rural High Sch. v. Grant Cnty. Planning Bd.	385 U.S. 6	1966
Dowdle v. New York	385 U.S. 7	1966
Calcaterra v. Illinois	385 U.S. 7	1966
Tietz v. Marienthal	385 U.S. 8	1966
Reynolds v. La. Bd. of Alcoholic Beverage Control	385 U.S. 8	1966
United States v. Ohio	385 U.S. 9	1966
Ferrante v. City of New York	385 U.S. 9	1966
Reed v. Illinois	385 U.S. 10	1966
Treffry v. Taylor	385 U.S. 10	1966
Capelouto v. Orkin Exterminating Co.	385 U.S. 11	1966
Maslowsky v. Cassidy	385 U.S. 11	1966
Bookcase, Inc. v. Leary	385 U.S. 12	1966
Guy v. Tahash	385 U.S. 12	1966
Neumann v. New York	385 U.S. 13	1966
McClellan v. Huston	385 U.S. 13	1966
Cross v. Bruning	385 U.S. 14	1966
Wakin v. Pennsylvania	385 U.S. 14	1966
Boyden v. May	385 U.S. 15	1966
Bradford v. Helman	385 U.S. 15	1966
Spiesel v. Roos	385 U.S. 16	1966
Bradford v. Postel	385 U.S. 16	1966
Kemp v. Hults	385 U.S. 17	1966
Phelper v. Decker	385 U.S. 18	1966
McGill v. Ryals	385 U.S. 19	1966
Atl. Coast Line R.R. Co. v. Trainmen	385 U.S. 20	1966
Giles v. Friendly Fin. Co.	385 U.S. 21	1966
Johnson v. California (1966)	385 U.S. 21	1966
Colo.-Ute Elec. Ass'n, Inc. v. W. Colo. Power Co.	385 U.S. 22	1966
Bradford v. Gavagan	385 U.S. 22	1966
Switzerland Cheese Ass'n, Inc. v. E. Horne's Market, Inc.	385 U.S. 23	1966
Black v. United States (1966)	385 U.S. 26	1966
Pitts. Towing Co. v. Miss. Valley Barge Line Co.	385 U.S. 32	1966
Kelsey v. Corbett	385 U.S. 35	1966
Carr v. Altus	385 U.S. 35	1966
Massey v. Georgia	385 U.S. 36	1966
Matranga v. McDonnell	385 U.S. 36	1966
Jos. Schlitz Brewing Co. v. United States	385 U.S. 37	1966
Transit Union v. United States	385 U.S. 38	1966
Adderley v. Florida	385 U.S. 39	1966
Ill. Cent. R.R. Co. v. Norfolk & W.R.R. Co.	385 U.S. 57	1966
Cichos v. Indiana	385 U.S. 76	1966
United Gas Pipe Line Co. v. FPC	385 U.S. 83	1966
O'Connor v. Ohio	385 U.S. 92	1966
United States v. Saskatchewan Mins.	385 U.S. 94	1966
Satanta Joint Rural High Sch. v. Haskell Cnty. Planning Bd.	385 U.S. 96	1966
Little v. Rhay	385 U.S. 96	1966
Bd. of Pub. Works v. Horace Mann League	385 U.S. 97	1966
Hall v. Mississippi	385 U.S. 98	1966
Bank of Marin v. England	385 U.S. 99	1966
Badgley v. Hare	385 U.S. 114	1966
Boyden v. California	385 U.S. 114	1966
Battaglia v. United States	385 U.S. 115	1966
Bond v. Floyd	385 U.S. 116	1966
United States v. Acme Process Equip. Co.	385 U.S. 138	1966
United States v. Demko	385 U.S. 149	1966
Transp.-Commc'n Emps. v. Union Pac. R.R. Co.	385 U.S. 157	1966
Canada Packers, Ltd. v. Atchison T. & S.F.R.R. Co.	385 U.S. 182	1966
Watkins v. Conway	385 U.S. 188	1966
Long v. Dist. Ct.	385 U.S. 192	1966
Walker v. S.R.R. Co.	385 U.S. 196	1966
New England Motor Rate Bureau, Inc. v. United States	385 U.S. 203	1966
Cady v. Missouri ex rel. State Highway Comm'n	385 U.S. 204	1966
Ministers Life & Cas. Union v. Haase	385 U.S. 205	1966
Lewis v. United States (1966)	385 U.S. 206	1966
INS v. Errico	385 U.S. 214	1966
Fortson v. Morris	385 U.S. 231	1966
First Nat'l Bank v. Walker Bank & Tr. Co.	385 U.S. 252	1966
United States v. Fabrizio	385 U.S. 263	1966
Woodby v. INS	385 U.S. 276	1966
Hoffa v. United States	385 U.S. 293	1966
Osborn v. United States	385 U.S. 323	1966
Dept. of Emp. v. United States	385 U.S. 355	1966
Heider v. Mich. Sugar Co.	385 U.S. 362	1966
Parker v. Gladden	385 U.S. 363	1966
Mason v. City of Biloxi	385 U.S. 370	1966
French v. California	385 U.S. 370	1966
Exley Express, Inc. v. United States	385 U.S. 371	1966
Laird & Co. v. Cheney	385 U.S. 371	1966
Schipani v. United States	385 U.S. 372	1966
Gen. Motors Corp. v. Appeal Bd.	385 U.S. 373	1966
Time, Inc. v. Hill	385 U.S. 374	1967
NLRB v. C & C Plywood Corp.	385 U.S. 421	1967
NLRB v. Acme Industrial Co.	385 U.S. 432	1967
Swann v. Adams	385 U.S. 440	1967
In re Meeker	385 U.S. 449	1967
Garcia v. Morales	385 U.S. 449	1967
Kirkpatrick v. Preisler	385 U.S. 450	1967
Nave v. City of Seattle	385 U.S. 450	1967
Summary dismissal for lack of a substantial federal question to create jurisdiction. Harlan and Stewart believed the court probably had jurisdiction and should have been set for argument.
Glouner v. Super. Ct.	385 U.S. 451	1967
Bogart v. Traynor	385 U.S. 451	1967
Webster v. Lee Cnty.	385 U.S. 452	1967
Hunter v. New York	385 U.S. 452	1967
Roosevelt Raceway, Inc. v. Nassau Cnty.	385 U.S. 453	1967
Nehring v. DeKalb	385 U.S. 453	1967
Federated Dept. Stores, Inc. v. Gerosa	385 U.S. 454	1967
Duddleston v. Grills	385 U.S. 455	1967
Droste v. Kerner	385 U.S. 456	1967
Ill. Cent. R.R. Co. v. United States	385 U.S. 457	1967
Lassen v. Arizona ex rel. Arizona Highway Dept.	385 U.S. 458	1967
United States v. Laub	385 U.S. 475	1967
Travis v. United States	385 U.S. 491	1967
Garrity v. New Jersey	385 U.S. 493	1967
Spevack v. Klein	385 U.S. 511	1967
McLeod v. Gen. Elec. Co.	385 U.S. 533	1967
Alexander v. Bd. of Rev.	385 U.S. 536	1967
McConaghy v. McConaghy	385 U.S. 536	1967
Short v. Ness Produce Co.	385 U.S. 537	1967
Sims v. Georgia	385 U.S. 538	1967
Whitus v. Georgia	385 U.S. 545	1967
Spencer v. Texas	385 U.S. 554	1967
Keyishian v. Board of Regents	385 U.S. 589	1967
Berenyi v. INS	385 U.S. 630	1967
Floyd & Beasley Transfer Co. v. United States	385 U.S. 647	1967
S. Pac. Co. v. City of Los Angeles	385 U.S. 647	1967
D'Amico v. NBC	385 U.S. 648	1967
McQuaid v. California	385 U.S. 648	1967
Fein v. New York	385 U.S. 649	1967
Sprowal v. New York	385 U.S. 649	1967
Patterson v. Newport News	385 U.S. 650	1967
Maxwell v. Bishop	385 U.S. 650	1967
