= Lao Development Association =

Political party in Laos

The Lao Development Association was a political party in Laos.

== History ==
The party began as the Southern Bloc, a conservative group led by Leuam Insisiengmai and Boun Oum, and won 15 seats in the 1965 elections, emerging as the largest party. Once in parliament, it formed the core of the Group of Thirty-Three.

The Group of Thirty-Three helped vote down the 1966 budget, leading to early elections in 1967. Following the elections the party was renamed the Lao Development Association. It was heavily defeated in the 1972 elections.
