= Bond v. Floyd =

- Supreme Court of the United States

Argued November 10, 1966 Decided December 5, 1966
- Full case name: Bond, et al. v. Floyd, et al.
- Citations: 385 U.S. 116 (more) 87 S. Ct. 339; 17 L. Ed. 2d 235; 1966 U.S. LEXIS 75

Holding
- Though a State may impose an oath requirement on legislators, it cannot limit their capacity to express views on local or national policy.

Court membership
- Chief Justice Earl Warren Associate Justices Hugo Black · William O. Douglas; Tom C. Clark · John M. Harlan II; William J. Brennan Jr. · Potter Stewart; Byron White · Abe Fortas

Case opinion
- Majority: Warren, joined by unanimous

Laws applied
- U.S. Const. amends. I, XIV

Bond v. Floyd, 385 U.S. 116 (1966), was a United States Supreme Court case in which the Court unanimously affirmed the First Amendment rights of state legislators and held that state legislators cannot lawfully limit a fellow legislator's right to express their views on local or national policy.

== Background ==
Julian Bond, an African American, was elected to the Georgia House of Representatives in June 1965. Bond was a member of the Student Nonviolent Coordinating Committee (SNCC), which opposed the Vietnam War. After his election, during a news interview, Bond endorsed SNCC's views, stating that he did not support the war, and that, as a pacifist, he was opposed to all war. Members of the Georgia House of Representatives objected to Bond's statements, and petitioned to prohibit him from joining the House. A hearing was held, and Bond repeated his pacifist viewpoints, but maintained that he never urged draft-card burning or other law violations. The House committee voted to prohibit Bond from joining the House.

Bond sued in federal court, but the United States District Court for the Northern District of Georgia upheld the House vote, with a three-judge panel concluding 2–1 that Bond's remarks exceeded criticism of national policy and that he could not in good faith take an oath to support the state and federal constitutions. Judges Lewis Render Morgan and Griffin Bell ruled against Bond, while Elbert Tuttle dissented.

Bond appealed to the Supreme Court.

== Opinion of the Court ==
The Supreme Court, in a unanimous decision, ordered the Georgia House of Representatives to permit Bond to take his seat. The Court held:

- Though a State may impose oath requirements on legislators, it cannot limit their capacity to express views on local or national policy.
- A majority of state legislators is not authorized to test the sincerity with which another duly elected legislator meets the requirement for holding office of swearing to support the Federal and State Constitutions.
- The State may not apply to a legislator a First Amendment standard stricter than that applicable to a private citizen.
