= Youth Movement (Laos) =

Defunct political party in Laos

The Youth Movement, also known as the Youth Party or Young People's Party, was a political party in Laos.

== History ==
The party was established in May 1965 by Sisouk na Champassak. It won twelve seats in the July 1965 elections. Although it supported much of the reform programme of Prime Minister Souvanna Phouma, they did not approve of his fiscal reforms, and helped vote down the 1966 budget. As a result, Phouma called early elections for January 1967. A change in the electoral law raised the minimum age for candidates from 30 to 35 and prevented many of its members from running. Although the party lost its national significance, it continued to exist into the 1970s.
