= 1965 Laotian parliamentary election =

Parliamentary elections were held in Laos on 18 July 1965 to elect members of the National Assembly, the lower chamber of Parliament. The elections were boycotted by the Lao Patriotic Front, and saw the Southern Bloc emerge as the largest party with 15 of the 59 seats. However, only 22,000 citizens were allowed to vote, with the franchise restricted to politicians, civil servants, army officers, police and local government officers.

== Results ==
Party	Seats
Southern Bloc	15
Lao Neutralist Party	14
Youth Movement	12
Vientiane Group	9
Independents	9
Total	59
Source: Nohlen et al.
