= Keyishian v. Board of Regents =

- Supreme Court of the United States

Argued November 17, 1966 Decided January 23, 1967
- Full case name: Keyishian, et al. v. Board of Regents of the University of the State of New York, et al.
- Citations: 385 U.S. 589 (more) 87 S. Ct. 675; 17 L. Ed. 2d 629; 1967 U.S. LEXIS 2454

Holding
- States cannot prohibit employees from being members of the Communist Party. Such laws are overbroad and too vague.

Court membership
- Chief Justice Earl Warren Associate Justices Hugo Black · William O. Douglas; Tom C. Clark · John M. Harlan II; William J. Brennan Jr. · Potter Stewart; Byron White · Abe Fortas

Case opinions
- Majority: Brennan, joined by Warren, Black, Douglas, Fortas
- Dissent: Clark, joined by Harlan, Stewart, White

Laws applied
- U.S. Const. amend. I

Keyishian v. Board of Regents, 385 U.S. 589 (1967), was a United States Supreme Court case in which the Court held that states cannot prohibit employees from being members of the Communist Party and that this law was overbroad and too vague.

== Background ==
New York State had laws that prohibited state employees from belonging to any organization that advocated the overthrow of the US government or was "treasonous" or "seditious." The regents of the State University of New York also required teachers and employees to sign an oath that they were not members of the Communist Party.

Some faculty and staff of the university were terminated for refusing to sign the oath and appealed to the Supreme Court.

== Decision ==
The Supreme Court, in a 5–4 decision, overturned the New York state laws prohibiting membership in seditious groups because it was too vague and was overbroad. That largely reversed the 1952 decision in Adler v. Board of Education, in which Irving Adler had been dismissed for the New York City public school system because of a previous connection with the Communist Party USA.

== See also ==
- List of United States Supreme Court cases involving the First Amendment
- List of United States Supreme Court cases, volume 385
