= 1967 Kuwaiti general election =

General elections were held in Kuwait on 25 January 1967. Pro-government candidates remained the largest bloc in Parliament. Voter turnout was 65.6%.

== Results ==
Party	Votes	%	Seats	+/–
Pro-government candidates			20	+1
Independents			17	+1
Shi'ite candidates			8	+2
Secular opposition			4	–4
Sunni candidates			1	0
Total			50	0
Total votes	17,590	–		
Registered voters/turnout	26,796	65.64		
Source: Nohlen et al.
