= Lewis v. United States (1966) =

- Supreme Court of the United States

Argued October 17, 1966 Decided December 12, 1966
- Full case name: Duke Lee Lewis v. United States
- Citations: 385 U.S. 206 (more)

Case history
- Prior: Conviction upheld in United States Court of Appeals for the First Circuit, 352 F.2d 799 (1965)

Holding
- When a person invites others into their home for illegal business, the Fourth Amendment is not violated when a government agent enters pursuant to the invitation and observes the illegal activity without conducting more invasive searches.

Court membership
- Chief Justice Earl Warren Associate Justices Hugo Black · William O. Douglas; Tom C. Clark · John M. Harlan II; William J. Brennan Jr. · Potter Stewart; Byron White · Abe Fortas

Case opinions
- Majority: Warren, joined by Black, Clark, Harlan, Stewart, White,
- Concurrence: Brennan, joined by Fortas
- Dissent: Douglas

Lewis v. United States, 385 U.S. 206 (1966), is a United States Supreme Court case involving the Fourth Amendment and the use of undercover agents and deception to obtain evidence of a crime. The Court held that the use of an undercover federal narcotics agent with a false identity did not violate the Fourth Amendment when he entered the petitioner's home by invitation to purchase marijuana.

== Background ==
On December 3, 1964, Edward Cass, an undercover federal narcotics agent who had never previously met the petitioner, Duke Lee Lewis, telephoned Lewis's home to inquire about purchasing marijuana. Cass falsely identified himself as "Jimmy the Pollack" and stated that a mutual friend had referred him. Lewis agreed to the sale and directed Cass to his home. Upon arrival, Lewis led Cass to a package on the front porch containing five bags of marijuana, and Cass gave Lewis $50 in exchange.

On December 17, 1964, a second sale took place following a similar phone conversation. Cass visited Lewis's home once again, paid $50, and received a package containing six bags of marijuana. Lewis was arrested on April 27, 1965, and charged with violations of federal narcotics laws relating to the sale of marijuana. Before trial, Lewis filed a motion to suppress the purchased narcotics and the conversations, arguing that the warrantless intrusion into his home constituted a warrantless search under the Fourth Amendment and that his invitation induced by fraud and deception did not serve as a valid waiver of his privacy.

The district court denied the motion, convicted Lewis, and sentenced him to concurrent five-year prison terms. The U.S. Court of Appeals for the First Circuit affirmed the conviction, and the U.S. Supreme Court granted certiorari to answer whether the use of an undercover agent and use of deception under these circumstances violated the Fourth Amendment.

== Opinion of the Court ==
Chief Justice Warren delivered the 8–1 opinion of the Court, which affirmed the First Circuit's judgment. The Court held that the facts of the case did not constitute a violation of the Fourth Amendment and affirmed the government's use of decoys and false identities to detect crimes where victims do not protest, such as the illegal narcotics sales.

The Court distinguished this case from Gouled v. United States, noting that Gouled involved an intruder who gained entry under the guise of a social visit but secretly ransacked an office and seized private papers. In Lewis, the agent entered solely for the specific purpose of executing a felonious sale of narcotics as contemplated by the occupant, seeing and taking only what was voluntarily transferred. While acknowledging that the home receives full Fourth Amendment protection, the Court held that this protection is forfeited when the home converts to a "commercial center" where outsiders are invited for the purpose of transacting unlawful business and that the business is entitled to no greater sanctity than if it were carried on in a store or on the street.

Justice Brennan authored a concurring opinion, joined by Justice Fortas. The concurrence was based on the reasoning that Lewis's apartment was not an area protected by the Fourth Amendment with respect to the transactions in question, because Lewis waived his right to privacy by opening his home to business and inviting individuals in to sell items to.

Justice Douglas authored a combined opinion dissenting in both Lewis and Osborn v. United States (while also concurring with Justice Clark in Hoffa v. United States). Douglas' dissent cited concerns regarding "various aspects of the constitutional right of privacy" as recently recognized in Griswold v. Connecticut and stated, "We are rapidly entering the age of no privacy, where everyone is open to surveillance at all times; where there are no secrets from government."
