= Lao Neutralist Party =

Defunct political party in Laos

The Lao Neutralist Party (Lao: ລາວເປັນກາງ, romanized: Lao Pen Kang) was a political party in Laos. It published the Say Kang newspaper.

== History ==
The party was established by Souvanna Phouma on 26 May 1961, and supported a neutral approach to foreign and internal affairs. After a period of inactivity, it contested the 1965 elections, winning fourteen of the 59 seats. The party subsequently suffered internal divisions over suggestions of a potential merger with parties with similar policies, including Peace and Neutrality Party. When a merger did not happen, the party stopped contesting national elections, although it continued to exist into the 1970s.
