= Garrity v. New Jersey =

- Supreme Court of the United States

Argued November 10, 1966 Decided January 16, 1967
- Full case name: Edward J. Garrity et al. v. State of New Jersey
- Citations: 385 U.S. 493 (more) 87 S. Ct. 616; 17 L. Ed. 2d 562

Case history
- Prior: State v. Naglee, 44 N.J. 209, 207 A.2d 689 (1965); State v. Holroyd, 44 N.J. 259, 208 A.2d 146 (1965).

Holding
- Where police officers being investigated were given choice either to incriminate themselves or to forfeit their jobs under New Jersey statute on ground of self-incrimination, and officers chose to make confessions, confessions were not voluntary but were coerced, and Fourteenth Amendment prohibited their use in subsequent criminal prosecution in state court.

Court membership
- Chief Justice Earl Warren Associate Justices Hugo Black · William O. Douglas; Tom C. Clark · John M. Harlan II; William J. Brennan Jr. · Potter Stewart; Byron White · Abe Fortas

Case opinions
- Majority: Douglas, joined by Warren, Black, Brennan, Fortas
- Dissent: Harlan, joined by Clark, Stewart
- Dissent: White

Laws applied
- U.S. Const. amends. V., XIV

Garrity v. New Jersey, 385 U.S. 493 (1967), was a case in which the Supreme Court of the United States held that law enforcement officers and other public employees have the right to be free from compulsory self-incrimination. It gave birth to the Garrity warning, which is administered by investigators to suspects in internal and administrative investigations in a similar manner as the Miranda warning is administered to suspects in criminal investigations.

== Background ==
In 1961 allegations of "ticket fixing" came to light in the boroughs of Bellmawr and Barrington, New Jersey. Six officers, including Edward Garrity, were suspected and subsequently interviewed in connection. Although they were told that their statements could be used to bring about criminal charges and that they were not required to answer any questions, the officers were threatened with removal from office if they did not cooperate. The officers answered the incriminating questions, which eventually led to criminal charges. The officers appealed their convictions, but they were upheld by the state supreme court.

The U.S. Supreme Court then ruled in Garrity v. New Jersey that the employees’ statements, made under threat of termination, were compelled by the state in violation of the Fifth and Fourteenth Amendments. The decision asserted that “the option to lose their means of livelihood or pay the penalty of self-incrimination is the antithesis of free choice to speak or to remain silent.”

Therefore, because the employees’ statements were compelled, it was unconstitutional to use the statements in a prosecution. The convictions were overturned.

== Majority opinion ==
The majority opinion, written by Douglas, found that the officers were compelled to testify against themselves under threat of removal from office. This constitutes coercion and violates the Fourteenth Amendment right due process clause as well as Fifth Amendment protection against self-incrimination. Their convictions were subsequently overturned.

'The privilege against self-incrimination would be reduced to a hollow mockery if its exercise could be taken as equivalent either to a confession of guilt or a conclusive presumption of perjury. * * * The privilege serves to protect the innocent who otherwise might be ensnared by ambiguous circumstances.' Id., at 557-558, 76 S.Ct. at 641.

We conclude that policemen, like teachers and lawyers, are not relegated to a watered-down version of constitutional rights.

== Harlan's dissent ==
Associate Justice Harlan, joined by Justices Clark and Stewart, argued that none of the officers' statements were coerced. They were also not under arrest; therefore, they weren't guaranteed Miranda rights.

It would be difficult to imagine interrogations to which these criteria of duress were more completely inapplicable, or in which the requirements which have subsequently been imposed by this Court on police questioning were more thoroughly satisfied. Each of the petitioners received a complete and explicit reminder of his constitutional privilege. Three of the petitioners had counsel present; at least a fourth had consulted counsel but freely determined that his presence was unnecessary. These petitioners were not in any fashion 'swept from familiar surroundings into police custody, surrounded by antagonistic forces, and subjected to the techniques of persuasion * * *.' Miranda v. State of Arizona, 384 U.S. 436, 461, 86 S.Ct. 1602, 1621. I think it manifest that, under the standards developed by this Court to assess voluntariness, there is no basis for saying that any of these statements were made involuntarily.

== See also ==
- List of United States Supreme Court cases, volume 385
- Due Process Clause
