= 1967 Laotian parliamentary election =

Parliamentary elections were held in Laos on 1 January 1967 to elect members of the National Assembly, the lower chamber of Parliament. The elections saw the universal franchise restored (the 1965 elections had been limited to politicians, civil servants, army officers, police and local government officers), and the voting age lowered back to 18.
