= List of international trips made by Hillary Clinton as United States Secretary of State =

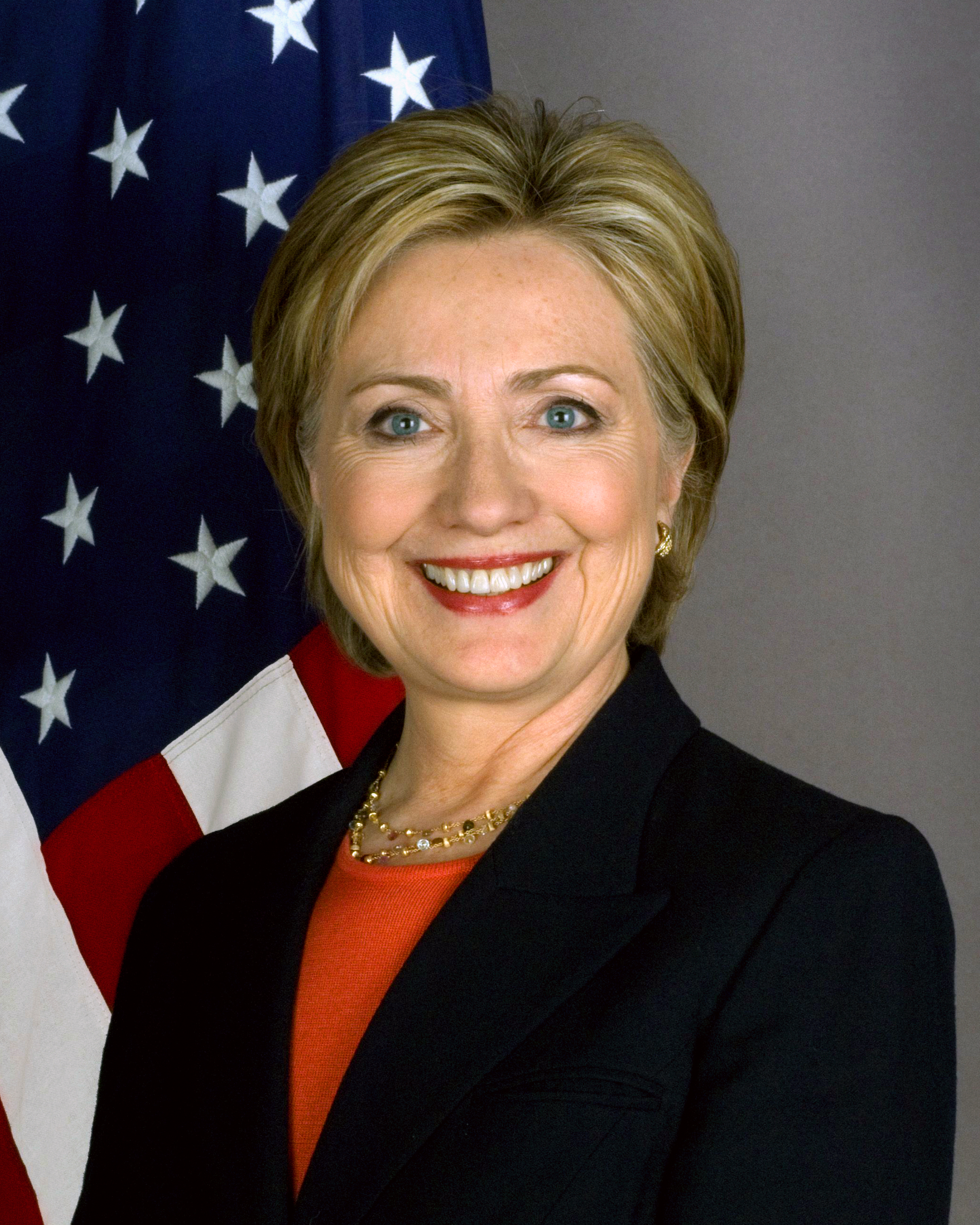
Official portrait of Hillary Clinton as Secretary of State, 2009

This is a list of international visits undertaken by Hillary Clinton (in office 2009–2013) while serving as the 67th United States secretary of state. The list includes both private travel and official state visits. The list includes only foreign travel which she made during her tenure in the position.

== Summary ==
Clinton visited 116 countries. The number of visits per country or territory where Secretary Clinton traveled are:

- One visit to Albania, Angola, Argentina, Bahrain, Bangladesh, Barbados, Benin, Brunei, Bulgaria, Chile, Congo, Cook Islands, Costa Rica, Côte d'Ivoire, Croatia, Dominican Republic, Ecuador, El Salvador, Estonia, Ethiopia, Finland, Ghana, Greece, Greenland, Honduras, Hungary, Iraq, Italy, Jamaica, Jordan, Kazakhstan, Kuwait, Kyrgyzstan, Laos, Latvia, Lebanon, Libya, Malawi, Malaysia, Malta, Mongolia, New Zealand, Norway, Papua New Guinea, Poland, Portugal, Senegal, South Sudan, Spain, Sweden, Tajikistan, Tanzania, Timor Leste, Togo, Trinidad and Tobago, Uganda, Ukraine, Uruguay, Yemen and Zambia
- Two visits to Algeria, Armenia, Australia, Azerbaijan, Bosnia and Herzegovina, Colombia, Denmark, Georgia, Guatemala, India, Ireland, Kenya, Kosovo, Liberia, Lithuania, Morocco, Myanmar, Netherlands, Nigeria, Oman, Peru, Philippines, Qatar, Saudi Arabia, Serbia, South Africa, Tunisia and Uzbekistan
- Three visits to Cambodia, Cape Verde, the Palestinian National Authority, Singapore, Thailand, United Arab Emirates and Vietnam
- Four visits to Afghanistan, Brazil, Canada, Czech Republic, Haiti, Indonesia, Japan, Pakistan and Russia
- Five visits to Israel, Mexico, South Korea, Switzerland and Turkey
- Six visits to Belgium and Germany
- Seven visits to China (Hong Kong) and Egypt
- Eight visits to France and the United Kingdom

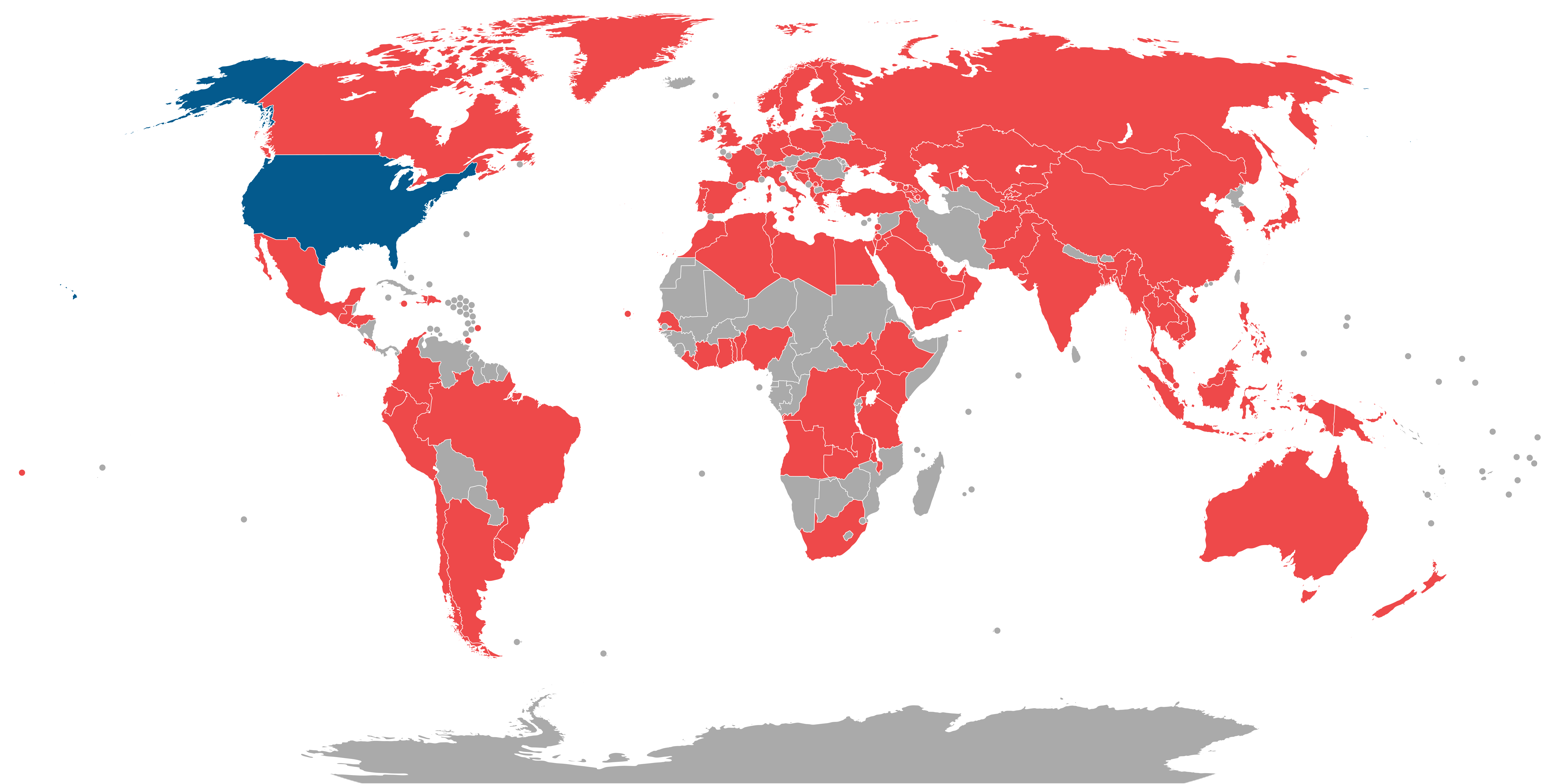
World map highlighting countries visited by Hillary Clinton as Secretary of State, 2009–2013: United States Countries visited No visits

== Table ==
	Country	Locations	Details	Dates	Images
1	Japan	Tokyo	Met with Foreign Minister Nakasone.	February 16–18, 2009	Secretary Clinton with Japanese Foreign Minister Hirofumi Nakasone in Tokyo, February 2009
1	Indonesia	Jakarta	Met with Foreign Minister Wirajuda and ASEAN Secretary General Pitsuwa.	February 18–19, 2009	Secretary Clinton with Indonesian Foreign Minister Hassan Wirajuda in Jakarta, February 2009
1	South Korea	Seoul	Met with Foreign Minister Yu; gave an address at Ewha Womans University.	February 19–20, 2009	Secretary Clinton with South Korean Foreign Minister Yu Myung-hwan in Seoul, February 2009
1	China	Beijing	Met with Foreign Minister Yang.	February 20–22, 2009	
2	Egypt	Sharm el-Sheikh	Attended the International Conference in Support of the Palestinian Economy for the Reconstruction of Gaza.	March 2–3, 2009	
2	Israel	Tel Aviv, Jerusalem	Met with President Peres, Prime Minister Olmert, and Foreign Minister Livni.	March 3–5, 2009	Secretary Clinton with Israeli President Shimon Peres in Jerusalem, March 2009
2	Palestinian National Authority	Ramallah	Met with President Abbas.	March 4, 2009	Secretary Clinton with Palestinian Authority President Mahmoud Abbas in Ramallah, March 2009
2	Belgium	Brussels	Attended a NATO Foreign Ministers' meeting and met with the EU and Swiss Foreign Ministers.	March 5–6, 2009	Secretary Clinton with EU Commission President José Manuel Barroso in Brussels, March 2009
2	Switzerland	Geneva	Met with Russian Foreign Minister Lavrov.	March 6–7, 2009	Secretary Clinton with Russian Foreign Minister Sergey Lavrov in Geneva, March 2009
2	Turkey	Ankara	Met with Foreign Minister Babacan.	March 7, 2009	Secretary Clinton with Turkish Foreign Minister Ali Babacan in Ankara, March 2009
3	Mexico	Mexico City, Monterrey	Met with Foreign Secretary Espinosa and discussed the Mérida Initiative.	March 25–26, 2009	Secretary Clinton with Mexican Foreign Patricia Secretary Espinosa in Monterrey, March 2009
4	Netherlands	The Hague	Attended the International Conference of Afghanistan.	March 31 – April 1, 2009	Secretary Clinton with Dutch Foreign Minister Maxime Verhagen in The Hague, March 2009
4	United Kingdom	London	Attended the G-20 Economic Summit with President Obama.	April 1–3, 2009	Secretary Clinton with President Obama and British Prime Minister Gordon Brown in London, April 2009
4	France	Strasbourg	Accompanied President Obama to the NATO Summit Meeting.	April 3–4, 2009	Secretary Clinton with President Obama and British Prime Minister Gordon Brown in Strasbourg, April 2009
4	Germany	Baden-Baden	Accompanied President Obama.	April 3–4, 2009	
4	Czech Republic	Prague	Accompanied President Obama.	April 4–5, 2009	Secretary Clinton with President Obama and Czech Republic President Vaclav Klaus in Prague, April 2009
5	Haiti	Port-au-Prince	Met with President Préval and Prime Minister Pierre-Louis.	April 16, 2009	Secretary Clinton with Haitian President René Préval in Port-au-Prince, April 2009
5	Dominican Republic	Santo Domingo	Met with President Fernández.	April 16–17, 2009	
5	Trinidad and Tobago	Port of Spain	Attended the Fifth Summit of the Americas.	April 17–19, 2009	Secretary Clinton with Venezuelan President Hugo Chavez in Port of Spain, April 2009
6	Kuwait	Kuwait City	Met with Foreign Minister al-Sabah and members of the Office of Military Cooperation.	April 24–25, 2009	
6	Iraq	Baghdad	Met with President Talebani, Prime Minister al-Maliki and senior officials. Visited U.S. military personnel, a Provincial Reconstruction Team, and attended a town meeting.	April 25, 2009	
6	Lebanon	Beirut	Met with President Sleiman and Foreign Minister Salloukh.	April 26, 2009	Secretary Clinton and Lebanese Foreign Minister Fawzi Salloukh in Beirut, April 2009
7	El Salvador	San Salvador	Attended the inauguration of President Funes and a ministerial meeting of Pathways to Prosperity in America.	May 31 – June 1, 2009	
7	Honduras	San Pedro Sula	Attended an OAS General Assembly meeting.	June 2, 2009	
7	Egypt	Cairo	Accompanied President Obama.	June 3–4, 2009	Secretary Clinton with President Obama in Cairo, June 2009
8	Canada	Niagara Falls	Commemorated the 100th anniversary of the Canada–U.S. Boundary Waters Treaty, and met with Foreign Minister Cannon.	June 13, 2009	Secretary Clinton with Canadian Foreign Minister Lawrence Cannon in Niagara Falls, June 2009
9	India	Mumbai, New Delhi	Met with Prime Minister Singh and External Affairs Minister Krishna. Discussed a U.S.–India strategic partnership.	July 17–21, 2009	Secretary Clinton with Indian Prime Minister Manmohan Singh in New Delhi, July 2009
9	Thailand	Bangkok, Phuket	Met with Prime Minister Abhisit and Foreign Minister Kasit. Attended the ASEAN Post–Ministerial Conference and Regional Forum in Phuket.	July 21–23, 2009	Secretary Clinton with Thai Prime Minister Abhisit Vejjajiva in Bangkok, July 2009
10	Kenya	Nairobi	Attended the 8th AGOA Forum. Met with Somalian President Sheikh Ahmed.	August 4–7, 2009	
10	South Africa	Johannesburg, Pretoria, Durban	Addressed an International Development Corporation event. Met with former Presidents Mandela and de Klerk and with President Zuma.	August 7–9, 2009	
10	Angola	Luanda	Met with Foreign Minister dos Anjos, addressed the National Assembly and signed a memorandum of understanding with Chevron and USAID.	August 9–10, 2009	
10	Congo, Democratic Republic of the	Kinshasa, Goma	Met with Prime Minister Muzito and President Kabila. Attended a round-table on gender-based violence issues.	August 10–11, 2009	Secretary Clinton with Congolese Foreign Minister Alexis Thambwe Mwamba in Goma, August 2009
10	Nigeria	Abuja	Met with Foreign Minister Maduekwe.	August 11–13, 2009	
10	Liberia	Monrovia	Met with President Johnson-Sirleaf. Addressed the National Assembly.	August 13–14, 2009	
10	Cape Verde	Sal	Met with Prime Minister Neves.	August 14, 2009	
11	Switzerland	Zürich	Witnessed the signing of a protocol to normalize relations between Armenia and Turkey.	October 9–10, 2009	Secretary Clinton with Armenian Foreign Minister Edouard Nalbandian in Zurich, October 2009
11	United Kingdom	London	Met with Prime Minister Brown and Foreign Secretary Miliband.	October 10–12, 2009	
11	Ireland	Dublin	Met with Prime Minister Cowen.	October 11, 2009	
11	United Kingdom	Belfast	Met with Northern Irish First Minister Robinson and Deputy First Minister McGuiness. Addressed the Northern Ireland Assembly and the Northern Ireland Business Working Group.	October 11–12, 2009	
11	Russia	Moscow, Kazan	Met with President Medvedev and Foreign Minister Lavrov concerning arms control, nonproliferation, and counterterrorism. In Kazan, met with Tatarstan President Shaymiyev and attended a dialogue on diversity at Kazan State University.	October 12–14, 2009	Secretary Clinton with Tatarstan President Mintimer Shaimiev in Kazan, October 2009
12	Pakistan	Islamabad, Lahore	Met with Foreign Minister Qureshi. Announced several assistance programs.	October 28–30, 2009	Secretary Clinton with Pakistani Foreign Minister Moeenuddin Ahmad Qureshi in Islamabad, October 2009
12	United Arab Emirates	Abu Dhabi	Met with Palestinian Authority President Abbas.	October 30, 2009	
12	Israel	Jerusalem	Met with Prime Minister Netanyahu and Foreign Minister Lieberman.	October 30 – November 2, 2009	Secretary Clinton with Israeli Prime Minister Benjamin Netanyahu, October 2009
12	Morocco	Marrakesh	Met with King Mohammed VI and Foreign Minister Fassi-Fihri and with the GCC+3 Foreign Ministers. Attended the 6th Forum for the Future.	November 2–3, 2009	
12	Egypt	Cairo	Met with President Mubarak, Foreign Minister Aboul Gheit, and Special Envoy Mitchell.	November 3–4, 2009	
13	Germany	Berlin	Attended ceremonies commemorating the 20th anniversary of the fall of the Berlin Wall. Met with Chancellor Merkel and Foreign Minister Westerwelle.	November 8–9, 2009	
14	Singapore	Singapore	Attended APEC Forum and Ministerial meetings.	November 10–12, 2009	Secretary Clinton with Japanese Foreign Minister Katsuya Okada in Singapore, November 2009
14	Philippines	Manila	Met with President Arroyo and Foreign Secretary Romulo. Announced new disaster relief program.	November 12–13, 2009	Secretary Clinton with Filipino Foreign Secretary Alberto Romulo in Malina, November 2009
14	Singapore	Singapore	Attended APEC Leaders' Meeting with President Obama.	November 13–16, 2009	
14	China	Beijing, Shanghai	Accompanied President Obama. Dedicated the USA Pavilion at the Shanghai Expo.	November 16–18, 2009	
14	Afghanistan	Kabul	Attended the inauguration of President Karzai.	November 18–19, 2009	
15	Belgium	Brussels	Attended a NATO Foreign Minister's Meeting, a meeting of the NATO–Russia Council, and met with representatives of non-NATO ISAF-contributing countries.	December 4, 2009	Secretary Clinton with NATO Foreign Ministers in Brussels, December 2009
16	Denmark	Copenhagen	Attended the UN Climate Change Conference.	December 18–19, 2009	
17	Haiti	Port-au-Prince	Met with Haitian officials and assessed disaster relief efforts.	January 16, 2010	
18	Canada	Montreal	Attended the Haiti Ministerial Preparatory Conference.	January 25, 2010	Secretary Clinton with Canadian Prime Minister Stephen Harper in Montreal, January 2010
18	United Kingdom	London	Attended a ministerial meeting on Yemen and the International Conference on Afghanistan.	January 26–29, 2010	Secretary Clinton with Afghan President Hamid Karzai in London, January 2010
18	France	Paris	Met with President Sarkozy and Foreign Minister Kouchner. Delivered an address on European security.	January 29, 2010	
19	Qatar	Doha	Met with Amir Sheikh Hamad bin Khalifa al-Thani and Foreign Minister Hamad bin Jassim al-Thani. Addressed the U.S.–Islamic World Forum.	February 14–15, 2010	
19	Saudi Arabia	Riyadh, Jeddah	Met with King Abdullah and Foreign Minister Prince Saud. Visited the Organization of the Islamic Conference headquarters and made a speech at the Dar Al-Hekma College in Jeddah on February 16.	February 15–16, 2010	
20	Uruguay	Montevideo	Attended the inauguration of President Mujica.	March 1, 2010	Secretary Clinton attends the inauguration of Uruguayan President José Mujica in Montevideo, March 2010
20	Argentina	Buenos Aires	Met with President Fernández de Kirchner.	March 1–2, 2010	Secretary Clinton with Argentine President Cristina Fernández de Kirchner in Montevideo, March 2010
20	Chile	Santiago de Chile	Met with President Bachelet and President-elect Piñera. Discussed disaster relief.	March 2, 2010	
20	Brazil	Brasília, São Paulo	Met with President Lula da Silva and Foreign Minister Amorim. Held a Townterview at Zumbi dos Palmares University in São Paulo.	March 2–3, 2010	Secretary Clinton with Brazilian President Luiz Inácio Lula da Silva in Brasília, March 2010
20	Costa Rica	San José	Addressed the Pathways to Prosperity in the Americas Ministerial Meeting and met with President Arias and President-elect Chinchilla.	March 4–5, 2010	
20	Guatemala	Guatemala City	Met with President Colom and with leaders of the Central American countries and the Dominican Republic.	March 5, 2010	
21	Russia	Moscow	Attended a Quarted meeting and discussed strategic arms reductions.	March 18–19, 2010	Secretary Clinton with Russian Prime Minister Vladimir Putin in Moscow, March 2010
22	Mexico	Mexico City	Attended a U.S.–Mexico High Level Consultative Group meeting and met with President Calderón and Foreign Secretary Espinosa.	March 23, 2010	
23	Canada	Ottawa, Gatineau	Attended a meeting of the Foreign Ministers of the Arctic Coastal States and a meeting of the G-8 Foreign Ministers.	March 29–30, 2010	Secretary Clinton with Canadian Prime Minister Stephen Harper in Ottawa, March 2010
24	Czech Republic	Prague	Accompanied President Obama to the signing of a Strategic Arms Reduction Treaty with Russia.	April 8–9, 2010	Secretary Clinton with President Obama in Prague, April 2010
25	Estonia	Tallinn	Attended a NATO Informal Ministerial Meeting. Met with President Ilves and Foreign Minister Paet.	April 22–23, 2010	Secretary Clinton with NATO Foreign Ministers in Tallinn, April 2010
26	Japan	Tokyo	Met with Foreign Minister Okada.	May 21, 2010	Secretary Clinton with Japanese Foreign Minister Katsuya Okada in Tokyo, May 2010
26	China	Shanghai, Beijing	Visited the Shanghai 2010 Expo and attended a dinner for sponsors of the USA Pavilion. In Beijing, attended the second meeting of the U.S.–China Strategic and Economic Dialogue.	May 21–26, 2010	
26	South Korea	Seoul	Met with Foreign Minister Yu.	May 26, 2010	Secretary Clinton with South Korean Foreign Minister Yu Myung-hwan in Seoul, May 2010
27	Peru	Lima	Attended a meeting of the General Assembly of the Organization of American States.	June 6–8, 2010	
27	Ecuador	Quito	Met with President Correa.	June 8, 2010	Secretary Clinton with Ecuadorian President Rafael Correa in Quito, June 2010
27	Colombia	Bogotá	Met with President Uribe.	June 8–9, 2010	
27	Barbados	Bridgetown	Attended a meeting of the CARICOM Foreign Ministers and announced the Caribbean Basin Security Initiative.	June 9–10, 2010	Secretary Clinton with CARICOM Foreign Ministers in Bridgetown, June 2010
28	Ukraine	Kyiv	Met with President Yanukovych and Foreign Minister Hryshchenko. Attended the second meeting of the U.S.–Ukraine Strategic Partnership.	July 1–2, 2010	Secretary Clinton with Ukrainian President Viktor Yanukovych in Kyiv, July 2010
28	Poland	Kraków	Met with Foreign Minister Sikorski. Commemorated the 10th anniversary of the founding of the Community of Democracies. Signed a ballistic missile defense agreement.	July 2–3, 2010	Secretary Clinton with Polish Foreign Minister Radosław Sikorski in Kraków, July 2010
28	Azerbaijan	Baku	Met with President Aliyev and Foreign Minister Mammadyarov.	July 4, 2010	
28	Armenia	Yerevan	Met with President Sargsian and Foreign Minister Nalbandian and with civic leaders.	July 4–5, 2010	Secretary Clinton with Armenian President Serzh Sargsyan in Yerevan, July 2010
28	Georgia	Tbilisi	Met with President Saakashvili, Foreign Minister Vashadze, and political and civil leaders.	July 5, 2010	Secretary Clinton with Georgian President Mikheil Saakashvili in Tbilisi, July 2010
29	Pakistan	Islamabad	Met with President Zardari, Prime Minister Gillani and Foreign Minister Qureshi. Attended a Strategic Dialogue meeting and announced a series of aid agreements. Promoted a trade agreement between Pakistan and Afghanistan.	July 18–19, 2010	Secretary Clinton with Pakistani President Asif Ali Zardari in Islamabad, July 2010
29	Afghanistan	Kabul	Met with President Karzai and attended an international conference on the future of Afghanistan.	July 19–20, 2010	
29	South Korea	Seoul, Panmunjom	Commemorated the 60th anniversary of the Korean War. Visited the DMZ. With Secretary of Defense Gates, attended a 2+2 meeting with South Korea's Foreign Minister and Minister of National Defense and with President Lee Myung-bak.	July 20–21, 2010	Secretary Clinton and Defense Secretary Gates with South Korean Foreign Minister Yu Myung-hwan and Defense Kim Tae-young in Seoul, July 2010
29	Vietnam	Hanoi	Attended the ASEAN Post–Ministerial Conference and Regional Forum Ministerial. Discussed the Lower Mekong Initiative.	July 21–23, 2010	
30	Egypt	Sharm el-Sheikh	Participated in Israeli–Palestinian negotiations.	September 14–25, 2010	Secretary Clinton with Egyptian President Hosni Mubarak in Sharm El-Sheikh, September 2010
30	Israel	Jerusalem	Met with President Peres and participated in Israeli–Palestinian negotiations.	September 15–16, 2010	Secretary Clinton with Israeli President Shimon Peres in Jerusalem, September 2010
30	Palestinian National Authority	Ramallah	Met with President Abbas and Prime Minister Fayyad.	September 16, 2010	
30	Jordan	Amman	Met with King Abdullah II.	September 16–17, 2010	
31	Bosnia and Herzegovina	Sarajevo	Dedicated new embassy compound, met with senior officials and with civil society representatives.	October 12, 2010	
31	Serbia	Belgrade	Met with President Tadić.	October 12–13, 2010	
31	Kosovo	Pristina	Met with Prime Minister Thaçi and with civil society representatives.	October 13, 2010	
31	Belgium	Brussels	Attended a NATO Ministerial meeting and met with the European Council President and the High Representative for Foreign Affairs.	October 13–14, 2010	Secretary Clinton with EU High Representative Catherine Ashton in Brussels, October 2010
32	Vietnam	Hanoi	Attended the East Asia Summit and the Lower Mekong Initiative meetings.	October 29–30, 2010	
32	China	Hainan	Met with State Councilor Dai Bingguo.	October 30, 2010	
32	Cambodia	Phnom Penh, Angkor Wat	Met with Deputy Prime Minister and Foreign Minister Namhong.	October 30 – November 1, 2010	
32	Malaysia	Kuala Lumpur	Met with Foreign Minister Aman.	November 1–3, 2010	
32	Papua New Guinea	Port Moresby	Met with Prime Minister Somare and visited a mangrove reforestation project.	November 3, 2010	
32	New Zealand	Wellington, Christchurch	Met with Prime Minister Key and Foreign Minister McCully. Visited the U.S. Antarctic Center.	November 3–5, 2010	Secretary Clinton with New Zealander Prime Minister John Key, November 2010
32	Australia	Melbourne	Attended the Australia–United States Ministerial Consultation. Met with the Prime Minister Gillard and Foreign Minister Rudd.	November 5–7, 2010	Secretary Clinton and Defense Secretary with Australian Foreign Minister Kevin Rudd and Defense Minister Stephen Smith in Melbourne, November 2010
33	Portugal	Lisbon	Attended the NATO and U.S.–EU Summits, the NATO–Russia Summit, and the International Security Assistance Force Summit.	November 18–20, 2010	
34	Kazakhstan	Astana	Led the U.S. delegation to the OSCE. Met with President Nazarbayev and Foreign Minister Saudabayev.	November 30 – December 2, 2010	Secretary Clinton with Kazakh President Nursultan Nazarbayev in Astana, December 2010
34	Kyrgyzstan	Bishkek	Met with President Otunbayeva and addressed U.S. military personnel at the Manas Transit Center.	December 2, 2010	
34	Uzbekistan	Tashkent	Met with President Karimov.	December 2, 2010	
34	Bahrain	Manama	Met with Foreign Minister al-Khalifa. Delivered the keynote address at the Manama Dialogue 2010.	December 3–4, 2010	
35	Canada	Wakefield	Attended the North American Foreign Ministers' Meeting.	December 13, 2010	
36	Brazil	Brasília	Attended the inauguration of President Rousseff.	January 1, 2011	Secretary Clinton attends the inauguration of Brazilian President Dilma Rousseff in Brasília, January 2011
37	United Arab Emirates	Abu Dhabi	Addressed the Masdar Institute.	January 9–11, 2011	
37	Yemen	Sana'a	Met with President Saleh. Addressed a Town Meeting.	January 11, 2011	
37	Oman	Masqat	Addressed a Town Meeting with Omani Civil Society.	January 12, 2011	
37	Qatar	Doha	Met with Prime Minister al-Thani. Addressed the Seventh Forum for the Future.	January 12–13, 2011	Secretary Clinton with UAE Foreign Minister Sheikh Abdullah bin Zayed al-Nahyan in Doha, January 2011
38	Mexico	Guanajuato	Met with Foreign Secretary Espinosa.	January 24, 2011	
39	Haiti	Port-au-Prince	Met with President Préval and with political and civic leaders.	January 30, 2011	
40	Germany	Munich	Attended the Munich Security Conference and exchanged ratifications of the new START Treaty with Russian Foreign Minister Lavrov.	February 5–6, 2011	Secretary Clinton at the Munich Security Conference, February 2011
41	Switzerland	Geneva	Discussed the crisis in Libya and addressed the Conference on Disarmament and the UN Human Rights Council.	February 28, 2011	Secretary Clinton with Russian Foreign Minister Sergey Lavrov in Geneva, February 2011
42	France	Paris	Attended a G-8 Foreign Ministers' Meeting.	March 14–15, 2011	Secretary Clinton with G8 Foreign Ministers in Paris, March 2011
42	Egypt	Cairo	Met with Prime Minister Sharaf, Foreign Minister al-Araby, and civic leaders.	March 15–17, 2011	
42	Tunisia	Tunis	Met with Prime Minister Kefi.	March 17, 2011	
43	France	Paris	Attended a Summit Meeting on the Libyan Crisis.	March 19, 2011	Secretary Clinton participates in a Summit Meeting in the Libyan Crisis in Paris, March 2011
44	United Kingdom	London	Attended the International Conference on the Libyan Crisis.	March 29, 2011	Secretary Clinton participates in the International Conference on the Libyan Crisis in London, March 2011
45	Germany	Berlin	Attended a NATO Foreign Ministers' Meeting and meetings of the NATO-Georgia and NATO–Ukraine Commissions and the NATO–Russia Council. Attended a memorial Service for Ambassador Holbrooke and received the Rathenau Prize.	April 14–15, 2011	Secretary Clinton with German Chancellor Angela Merkel in Berlin, April 2011
45	South Korea	Seoul	Met with President Lee and Foreign Minister Kim.	April 16–17, 2011	
45	Japan	Tokyo	Met with Prime Minister Kan and Foreign Minister Matsumoto.	April 17, 2011	Secretary Clinton with Japanese Prime Minister Naoto Kan in Tokyo, April 2011
46	Italy	Rome	Attended a Libya Contact Group Meeting.	May 5–6, 2011	Secretary Clinton participates in a Libya Contact Group Meeting in Rome, May 2011
47	Greenland	Nuuk	Attended the Seventh Ministerial Meeting of the Arctic Council. Signed Arctic Search and Rescue Agreement.	May 11–12, 2011	
48	United Kingdom	London	Accompanied President Obama on a state visit.	May 23–25, 2011	Secretary Clinton with British Foreign Secretary William Hague in London, May 2011
48	France	Paris	Attended the 50th Anniversary OECD Ministerial Meeting. Inaugurated UNESCO's Global Partnership for Girls' and Women's Education.	May 25–26, 2011	
48	Pakistan	Islamabad	Met with President Zardari and Pakistani government and military leaders.	May 27, 2011	
49	United Arab Emirates	Abu Dhabi	Attended a meeting of the Libya Contact Group.	June 9–10, 2011	
49	Zambia	Lusaka	Attended a meeting of the African Growth and Opportunity Act Ministerial Forum. Met with President Banda.	June 10–11, 2011	
49	Tanzania	Dar es Salaam	Attended a meeting on nutrition and the 1,000 Days Initiative. Met with President Kikwete.	June 11–13, 2011	
49	Ethiopia	Addis Abeba	Addressed the African Union Assembly. Met with Chairperson Ping and Ethiopian Prime Minister Zenawi.	June 13–14, 2011	
50	Guatemala	Guatemala City	Attended the Conference of Support for the Central American Security Strategy.	June 22, 2011	
50	Jamaica	Montego Bay	Attended the High Level U.S.–Caribbean Conference.	June 22, 2011	Secretary Clinton with Jamaican Foreign Minister Kenneth Baugh in Montego Bay, June 2011
51	Hungary	Budapest	Dedicated the Lantos Institute. Met with Prime Minister Orbán and Foreign Minister Martonyi.	June 29–30, 2011	Secretary Clinton with Hungarian Prime Minister Viktor Orbán in Budapest, June 2011
51	Lithuania	Vilnius	Attended the 6th Ministerial meeting of the Community of Democracies. Met with President Grybauskaitė and Prime Minister Kubilius.	June 30 – July 1, 2011	
51	Spain	Madrid	Met with President Rodríguez Zapatero and Foreign Minister Jiménez.	July 1–2, 2011	
52	Turkey	Istanbul	Attended a Libya Contact Group meeting. Met with President Gül, Prime Minister Erdoğan, and Foreign Minister Davutoğlu. Attended a meeting of the Organization of the Islamic Conference on combating religious intolerance.	July 15–17, 2011	
52	Greece	Athens	Met with President Papoúlias, Prime Minister Panandreou, and Foreign Minister Lambrinidis. Signed a memorandum of understanding to preserve Greece's cultural heritage.	July 17–18, 2011	
53	Indonesia	Bali	Attended the ASEAN Regional Forum and the U.S.–Lower Mekong Ministerial meetings, the Second U.S.–Indonesia Joint Committee meeting, and the U.S.–Japan–Republic of Korea Trilateral meeting.	July 21–25, 2011	Secretary Clinton with Indonesian Foreign Minister Marty Natalegawa in Bali, July 2011
53	China	Hong Kong, Shenzhen	Met with the Hong Kong Executive and Legislative Council, and with State Councilor Dai Bingguo in Shenzhen.	July 25, 2011	
54	France	Paris	Attended a meeting of the Contact Group on Libya.	September 1, 2011	Secretary Clinton participates in a meeting of the Contact Group on Libya in Paris, September 2011
55	Malta	Valletta	Met with Prime Minister Gonzi.	October 18–19, 2011	
55	Libya	Tripoli	Met with Transitional National Council President Jalil and Prime Minister Jabril.	October 18, 2011	
55	Oman	Masqat	Met with Sultan Qaboos.	October 19–20, 2011	
55	Afghanistan	Kabul	Met with President Karzai and Afghan civil leaders.	October 20, 2011	Secretary Clinton with Afghan President Hamid Karzai in Kabul, October 2011
55	Pakistan	Islamabad	Met with Prime Minister Gilani, Foreign Minister Khar, and President Zardari.	October 20–21, 2011	
55	Tajikistan	Dushanbe	Met with President Rahmon and Foreign Minister Zarifi. Addressed civil society representatives.	October 21–22, 2011	Secretary Clinton with Tajik President Emomali Rahmon in Dushanbe, October 2011
55	Uzbekistan	Tashkent	Met with President Karimov.	October 22, 2011	
56	Philippines	Manila	Signed the Manila Declaration and a Partnership for Growth agreement. Received the Order of Lakandula.	November 15–16, 2011	
56	Thailand	Bangkok	Met with Prime Minister Yingluck Shinawatra. Announced flood recovery assistance.	November 16–17, 2011	
56	Indonesia	Bali	Attended the East Asia Summit and the U.S.–ASEAN Leaders Meeting. Addressed the Millennium Challenge Corporation signing ceremony.	November 17–19, 2011	Secretary Clinton with President Obama in Bali, November 2011
57	South Korea	Busan	Attended the Fourth High-Level Forum on Aid Effectiveness and the Partnership for Growth Meeting.	November 30, 2011	
57	Myanmar	Naypyidaw, Rangoon	Met with President Thein Sein, Foreign Minister Lwin, Aung San Suu Kyi, and civic and minority representatives.	November 30 – December 2, 2011	Secrtary Clinton with Daw Aung San Suu Kyi in Rangoon, November 2011
58	Germany	Bonn	Attended the International Conference for Afghanistan.	December 5, 2011	
58	Lithuania	Vilnius	Attended an OSCE Ministerial Meeting. Met with members of Belarus civil society.	December 6, 2011	
58	Switzerland	Geneva	Commemorated International Human Rights Day and the anniversaries of the Refugee and Statelessness Conventions. Met with members of the Syrian National Council. Addressed the 7th Biological and Toxin Weapons Review Conference.	December 6–7, 2011	
58	Belgium	Brussels	Attended the NATO Ministerial Meeting and a meeting of the NATO–Russia Council. Signed the U.S.–Slovak Joint Action Plan to Combat Nuclear Smuggling.	December 7–8, 2011	
58	Netherlands	The Hague	Met with Foreign Minister Rosenthal and addressed the Conference on Internet Freedom.	December 8, 2011	
59	Czech Republic	Prague	Attended the funeral of former President Václav Havel.	December 23, 2011	
60	Cape Verde	Sal	Refueling stop en route to Liberia.	January 15, 2012	
60	Liberia	Monrovia	Attended the inauguration of President Ellen Johnson Sirleaf; dedicated a new U.S. Embassy compound.	January 16–17, 2012	
60	Côte d'Ivoire	Abidjan	Met with President Alassane Ouattara and Foreign Minister Daniel Kablan Duncan. Addressed the Center for Research and Action for Peace.	January 17, 2012	Secretary Clinton with Ivoirian President Alassane Ouattara in Abidjan, January 2012
60	Togo	Lomé	Met with President Faure Gnassingbe.	January 17, 2012	
60	Cape Verde	Sal	Met with President Jose Neves.	January 17, 2012	
61	Germany	Munich	Attended the 48th Munich Security Conference.	February 4–5, 2012	Secretary Clinton at the Munich Security Conference, February 2012
61	Bulgaria	Sofia	Met with President Rosen Plevneliev, senior officials and young Roma professionals.	February 5, 2012	Secretary Clinton with Bulgarian President Rosen Plevneliev in Sofia, February 2012
62	Mexico	Los Cabos	Attended a G-20 Ministerial Meeting. Signed U.S.–Mexico Transboundary Agreement.	February 19–20, 2012	
63	United Kingdom	London	Attended the Conference on Somalia.	February 23–24, 2012	Secretary Clinton participates in the Conference on Somalia in London, February 2012
63	Tunisia	Tunis	Attended the "Friends of Syria" meeting. Met with President Moncef Marzouki and Prime Minister Hamadi Jebali. Held a townhall meeting.	February 24–25, 2012	
63	Algeria	Algiers	Met with President Abdelaziz Bouteflika and held a civil society roundtable.	February 25–26, 2012	
63	Morocco	Rabat	Met with Royal Counselor Fahri Fihri and Foreign Minister Saad Eddine al-Othmani. Hosted the ground-breaking ceremony for a new Embassy.	February 26, 2012	
64	Saudi Arabia	Riyadh	Met with King Abdullah and Foreign Minister Prince Saud. Attended the First Ministerial Meeting of the Gulf Cooperation Council–U.S. Strategic Cooperation Forum.	March 30–31, 2012	Secretary Clinton with Saudi King Abdullah in Riyadh, March 2012
64	Turkey	Istanbul	Attended the second meeting of the "Friends of the Syrian People." Met with Prime Minister Tayyip Erdoğan, Foreign Minister Ahmet Davutoğlu, Arab League Secretary-General Nabil al-Araby, and the Syrian National Council.	March 31 – April 1, 2012	Secretary Clinton participates in the meeting of the Friends of the Syrian People in Istanbul, April 2012
65	Colombia	Cartagena	Attended the 6th Summit of the Americas.	April 13–16, 2012	
65	Brazil	Brasília	Attended the 3rd U.S.–Brazil Global Partnership Dialogue. Addressed the First Annual meeting of the Open Government Partnership.	April 16–18, 2012	
65	Belgium	Brussels	Attended a joint meeting of NATO Foreign and Defense Ministers, and a meeting of the NATO–Russia Council.	April 18–19, 2012	Secretary Clinton with Belgian Prime Minister Elio Di Rupo in Brussels, April 2012
65	France	Paris	Attended an ad hoc ministerial meeting on Syria.	April 19, 2012	
66	China	Beijing	Attended the 4th joint meeting of the U.S.–China Economic and Strategic Dialogue and the 3rd U.S.–China High Level Consultation on People-to-People Exchange.	May 2–5, 2012	
66	Bangladesh	Dhaka	Met with Prime Minister Sheikh Hasina Wazed, Foreign Minister Dipu Moni, and civil society representatives. Signed Agreement to Establish Partnership.	May 5–6, 2012	
66	India	Kolkata, New Delhi	Attended an Anti-Trafficking Champions event. Met with Prime Minister Manmohan Singh and Foreign Minister Somanahalli Krishna.	May 6–8, 2012	Secretary Clinton with Indian Foreign Minister Somanahalli Mallaiah Krishna in New Delhi, May 2012
67	Denmark	Copenhagen	Met with Queen Margrethe II, Prime Minister Helle Thorning-Schmidt, and Foreign Minister Villy Sovndal. Attended a green partnership for growth event.	May 31 – June 1, 2012	
67	Norway	Oslo, Tromsø	Met with King Harald V, Prime Minister Jens Stoltenberg, and Foreign Minister Jonas Støre. Addressed a global health conference. Took part in a meeting on the High North at Tromso.	May 31 – June 3, 2012	
67	Sweden	Stockholm	Met with Prime Minister Fredrik Reinfeldt and Foreign Minister Carl Bildt. Addressed a meeting of the Climate and Clean Air Coalition.	June 3–4, 2012	Secretary Clinton with Swedish Prime Minister Fredrik Reinfeldt in Stockholm, June 2012
67	Armenia	Yerevan	Met with President Serzh Sargsyan and Foreign Minister Eduard Nalbandyan. Addressed the Universal Rights Award Ceremony.	June 4–5, 2012	
67	Georgia	Batumi	Met with President Mikheil Saakashvili and Prime Minister Nika Gilauri. Opened the omnibus session of the U.S.–Georgia Strategic Partnership Commission.	June 5–6, 2012	
67	Azerbaijan	Baku	Met with President Ilham Aliyev and Foreign Minister Elmar Mammadyarov. Attended the Caspian Oil and Gas Show.	June 6–7, 2012	
67	Turkey	Istanbul	Met with Foreign Minister Ahmet Davutoğlu, Deputy Prime Minister Ali Babacan, and Swiss Foreign Minister Didier Burkhalter. Co-chaired the Global Counterterrorism Forum.	June 7, 2012	
68	Mexico	Los Cabos	Attended the G-20 Meeting.	June 18–19, 2012	Secretary Clinton with President Obama in Los Cabos, June 2012
68	Brazil	Rio de Janeiro	Attended the UN Conference on Sustainable Development.	June 20–22, 2012	
69	Finland	Helsinki	Met with President Sauli Niinistö, Prime Minister Jyrki Katainen, and Foreign Minister Erkki Tuomioja. Signed General Security of Information Agreement. Attended Climate Clean Air Coalition Event.	June 27–28, 2012	
69	Latvia	Riga	Met with President Andris Berzins, Prime Minister Valdis Dombrovskis, and Foreign Minister Edgar Rinkevics. Signed Academic Exchange Program Agreement and an agreement supporting justice sector reform in Moldova. Dedicated Sumner Welles Street.	June 28, 2012	
69	Russia	Saint Petersburg	Attended the APEC Women and the Economy Forum. Met with Foreign Minister Sergey Lavrov.	June 28–29, 2012	
69	Switzerland	Geneva	Attended a P3 meeting and the opening session of the Action Group on Syria.	June 29–30, 2012	
70	France	Paris	Met with President François Hollande, Foreign Minister Laurent Fabius, Syrian opposition leaders, and Palestinian Authority President Mahmoud Abbas. Attended a Friends of the Syrian People Ministerial Meeting.	July 6–7, 2012	
70	Afghanistan	Kabul	Met with President Hamid Karzai. Announced the designation of Afghanistan as a Major Non-NATO Ally.	July 7, 2012	
70	Japan	Tokyo	Met with Prime Minister Yoshihiko Noda and Foreign Minister Koichiro Gemba. Attended the Conference on Afghanistan.	July 7–9, 2012	Secretary Clinton with Japanese Prime Minister Yoshihiko Noda in Tokyo, July 2012
70	Mongolia	Ulaanbaatar	Met with President Tsakhiagiin Elbegdorj and Prime Minister Sukhbaatar Batbold. Addressed the International Women's Leadership Forum, the Leaders Engaged in New Democracies Network, and the Community of Democracies Governing Council.	July 9, 2012	
70	Vietnam	Hanoi	Met with Prime Minister Nguyễn Tấn Dũng and Foreign Minister Phạm Bình Minh. Attended an American Chamber of Commerce Reception.	July 10–11, 2012	
70	Laos	Vientiane	Met with Prime Minister Thongsing Thammavong and Foreign Minister Thongloun Sisoulith.	July 11, 2012	Secretary Clinton with Laotian Prime Minister Thongsing Thammavong in Vientiane, July 2012
70	Cambodia	Phnom Penh, Siĕm Réab	Met with Prime Minister Hun Sen. Attended the U.S.–ASEAN and East Asia Summit Ministerial Meetings and the East Asia Regional Forum Retreat. Attended a Friends of the Lower Mekong Ministerial Meeting. In Siem Reap, met with the Prime Minister of Thailand and the President of Burma, addressed the Gender Equality and Women's Empowerment Policy Dialogue, and attended a U.S.–ASEAN Business Forum.	July 11–13, 2012	Secretary Clinton with Cambodian Prime Minister Hun Sen in Phnom Penh, July 2012
70	Egypt	Cairo, Alexandria	Met with President Mohammed Morsi, Foreign Minister Mohamed Kamel Amr, Field Marshal Mohamed Tantawi, and Christian leaders. Dedicated the Consulate General at Alexandria.	July 14–16, 2012	Secretary Clinton with Egyptian President Mohammed Morsi in Cairo, July 2012
70	Israel	Jerusalem	Met with President Shimon Peres, Prime Minister Benjamin Netanyahu, Foreign Minister Avigdor Liberman, Defense Minister Ehud Barak, Palestinian Authority President Salam Fayyad, and Quartet Representative Tony Blair.	July 16, 2012	Secretary Clinton with Israeli Prime Minsiter Benjamin Netanyahu in Jerusalem, July 2012
71	Senegal	Dakar	Met with President Macky Sall.	August 1–2, 2012	
71	Uganda	Kampala	Met with President Yoweri Museveni. Addressed Human rights defenders.	August 2–4, 2012	Secretary Clinton with Ugandan President Yoweri Museveni in Kampala, August 2012
71	South Sudan	Juba	Met with President Salva Kiir and Foreign Minister Nhial Deng Nhial. Afterwards returned to Kampala.	August 3, 2012	
71	Kenya	Nairobi	Met with President Mwai Kibaki, Chief Justice Willy Mutunga, Prime Minister Raila Odinga, Somali Roadmap Signatories and the Independent Electoral and Boundaries Commission and Civil Society.	August 4–5, 2012	
71	Malawi	Lilongwe	Met with President Joyce Banda. Visited Camp GLOW and the Lumbadze Group.	August 5–6, 2012	Secretary Clinton with Malawian President Joyce Banda in Lilongwe, August 2012
71	South Africa	Qunu, Johannesburg, Cape Town	Met with former President Nelson Mandela at Qunu. Attended U.S.–South Africa Business Partnership Summit and U.S.–South Africa Strategic Dialogue Plenary Session in Johannesburg. Met with Foreign Minister Maite Nkoana-Mashabane and AU Chair-Designate Nkosazana Dlamini-Zuma. Participated in a PEPFAR Transition signing and met with former President F.W. de Klerk in Cape Town.	August 6–9, 2012	Secretary Clinton with South African Foreign Minister Maite Nkoana-Mashabane in Johannesburg, August 2012
71	Nigeria	Abuja	Met with President Goodluck Jonathan, the Nigerian National Security Council, and Anti-Corruption Leaders.	August 9, 2012	
71	Ghana	Accra	Met with President John Dramani Mahama. Attended funeral service for the late President John Atta Mills.	August 9–10, 2012	
71	Benin	Cotonou	Met with President Boni Yayi.	August 10–11, 2012	Secretary Clinton with Beninese President Boni Yayi in Cotonou, August 2012
71	Turkey	Istanbul	Met with President Abdullah Gül, Prime Minister Recep Erdoğan, Foreign Minister Ahmet Davutoğlu, and Syrian activists and refugees.	August 11–12, 2012	Secretary Clinton with Turkish President Recep Tayyip Erdoğan in Istanbul, August 2012
72	Cook Islands	Rarotonga	Attended the Pacific Islands Forum.	August 31 – September 2, 2012	Secretary Clinton with Cook Islander Prime Minister Henry Puna in Rarotonga, August 2012
72	Indonesia	Jakarta	Met with Foreign Minister Marty Natalegawa, President Susilo Yudhoyono and ASEAN Secretary-General Surin Pitsuwan. Discussed U.S.–Indonesian Comprehensive Partnership.	September 3–4, 2012	Secretary Clinton with Indonesian Foreign Minister Marty Natalegawa in Jakarta, September 2012
72	China	Beijing	Met with Foreign Minister Yang Jiechi, President Hu Jintao, Premier Wen Jiabao, and State Councilor Dai Bingguo.	September 4–6, 2012	Secretary Clinton with Chinese President Hu Jintao in Beijing, September 2012
72	Timor Leste	Dili	Met with President Taur Ruak and Prime Minister Xanana Gusmão.	September 6, 2012	Secretary Clinton with Timor Leste President Taur Matan Ruak in Dili, September 2012
72	Brunei	Bandar Seri Begawan	Met with Sultan Hassanal Bolkiah and Foreign Minister Prince Mohamed. Inaugurated Brunei–U.S. English Language Enrichment Project.	September 6–7, 2012	Secretary Clinton with Foreign Minister Prince Mohamed Bolkiah in Bandar Seri Begawan, September 2012
72	Russia	Vladivostok	Attended APEC Economic Leaders Meeting. Signed a Memorandum of Understanding on U.S.–Russian Cooperation in the Antarctic and a Joint Statement on Strengthening U.S.-Russian Inter-Regional Cooperation.	September 7–9, 2012	Secretary Clinton with APEC Leaders in Vladivostok, September 2012
73	Peru	Lima	Met with President Ollanta Humala. Addressed Conference on Power: Women as Drivers of Growth and Social Inclusion.	October 15–16, 2012	
74	Haiti	Cap-Haïtien	Attended the opening of the Caracol Industrial Park. Met with President Michel Martelly and Prime Minister Laurent Lamothe.	October 22, 2012	Secretary Clinton with Haitian President Michel Martelly in Cap-Haïtien, October 2012
75	Algeria	Algiers	Met with President Abdelaziz Bouteflika.	October 29–30, 2012	Secretary Clinton with Algerian President Abdelaziz Bouteflika in Algiers, October 2012
75	Bosnia and Herzegovina	Sarajevo	Met with EU High Representative Catherine Ashton and the members of the Bosnian Presidency.	October 30, 2012	
75	Serbia	Belgrade	Met with EU High Representative Ashton and Prime Minister Ivica Dačić.	October 30–31, 2012	Secretary Clinton with Serbian Prime Minister Ivica Dačić in Belgrade, October 2012
75	Kosovo	Pristina	Met with EU High Representative Ashton and President Atifete Jahjaga and Prime Minister Hashim Thaçi.	October 31, 2012	
75	Croatia	Zagreb	Met with President Ivo Josipović, Prime Minister Zoran Milanović, and Foreign Minister Vesna Pusić.	October 31 – November 1, 2012	Secretary Clinton with Croatian President Ivo Josipović in Zagreb, October 2012
75	Albania	Tirana	Met with President Bujar Nishani, Prime Minister Sali Berisha, and Socialist Party leader Edi Rama. Addressed the Parliament and received the Order of the National Flag.	November 1, 2012	
76	Australia	Perth, Adelaide	Met with Prime Minister Julia Gillard, Foreign Minister Bob Carr, and Defense Minister Stephen Smith. Opened the Perth USAsia Centre. Attended the Australia–United States Ministerial Consultations.	November 13–15, 2012	Secretary Clinton and Defense Secretary Leon Panetta with Australian Prime Julia Gillard, Foreign Minister Bob Carr and Defense Minister Stephen Smith in Perth, November 2012
76	Singapore	Singapore	Met with former Prime Minister Lee Kuan Yew, Prime Minister Lee Hsien Loong, and Foreign Minister Kasiviswanathan Shanmugam.	November 16–18, 2012	Secretary Clinton with Singaporean Prime Minister Lee Kuan Yew in Singapore, November 2012
76	Thailand	Bangkok	Met with Prime Minister Yingluck Shinawatra. Joined President Obama.	November 18–19, 2012	Secretary Clinton with President Obama in Bangkok, November 2012
76	Myanmar	Rangoon	Accompanied President Obama. Met with President Thein Sein and opposition leader Aung San Suu Kyi.	November 19, 2012	Secretary Clinton with President Obama and Aung San Suu Kyi in Rangoon, November 2012
76	Cambodia	Phnom Penh	Attended U.S.–ASEAN Leaders' Meeting and the East Asia Summit.	November 19–20, 2012	Secretary Clinton with Russian Foreign Minister Sergey Lavrov in Phnom Penh, November 2012
76	Israel	Jerusalem	Discussed the Gaza Crisis with Prime Minister Benjamin Netanyahu and UN Secretary-General Ban Ki-moon.	November 20–21, 2012	Secretary Clinton with Israeli Prime Minister Benjamin Netanyahu in Jerusalem, November 2012
76	Palestinian National Authority	Ramallah	Discussed the Gaza Crisis with President Mahmoud Abbas.	November 21, 2012	Secretary Clinton with Palestine Authority President Mahmoud Abbas in Ramallah, November 2012
76	Egypt	Cairo	Discussed the Gaza Crisis with President Mohammed Morsi and Foreign Minister Mohamed Kamel Amr.	November 21, 2012	
77	Czech Republic	Prague	Met with Prime Minister Petr Necas and Foreign Minister Karel Schwarzenberg.	December 3–4, 2012	
77	Belgium	Brussels	Attended the 28th session of the North Atlantic Council and meetings of the NATO–Georgia Council, with Non-NATO ISAF Contributing Countries, and the U.S.–EU Energy Council.	December 4–5, 2012	Secretary Clinton with EU High Representative Catherine Ashton in Brussels, December 2012
77	Ireland	Dublin	Attended the OSCE Ministerial Council meeting, and met with President Michael Higgins and Prime Minister Enda Kenny.	December 6–7, 2012	Secretary Clinton with Irish President Michael Higgins in Dublin, December 2012
77	United Kingdom	Belfast	Met with First Minister Peter Robinson and Deputy First Minister Martin McGuinness.	December 7, 2012	

== See also ==
- Foreign policy of the Obama administration
- List of international presidential trips made by Barack Obama
