= Tom Cooney =

American diplomat

Thomas Cooney
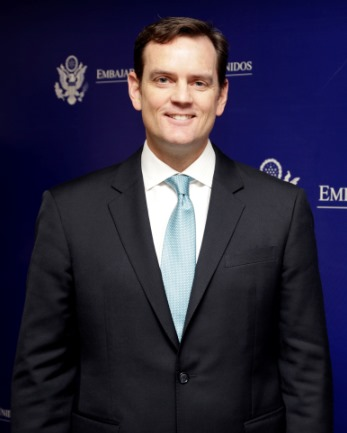

United States Ambassador to Argentina Charge d'affaires
- In office January 20, 2017 – May 15, 2018
- President: Donald Trump
- Preceded by: Noah Mamet
- Succeeded by: Edward C. Prado

Personal details
- Born: Royal Oak, Michigan
- Children: 3
- Education: Shrine High School; Cornell University; University of South Carolina

Thomas E. Cooney is a former American diplomat who most recently served as the charge d'affaires of the United States Embassy to Buenos Aires, Argentina from 2017 to 2018. He retired from the State Department with the senior rank of Minister Counselor in 2019 and became Vice President of Global Public Policy for General Motors in Detroit. In 2023, he joined Capital Group, a large global asset management financial company, in its Los Angeles headquarters as Vice President and International Policy Advisor.

== Career ==
Cooney, a native of Detroit, speaks Spanish and Mandarin Chinese. He was a career member of the U.S. foreign service, having served as a foreign policy advisor to the Commanding General of the United States Army, Pacific and as Deputy Consul General to the Consulate General in Hong Kong and Macau. He was the Deputy Commissioner General for the USA pavilion at Expo 2010 during his tenure as Public Affairs Officer of the United States Consulate General Shanghai.

Cooney became Deputy Chief of Mission of the U.S. Diplomatic Mission to Argentina on July 30, 2016, and took office as the interim Ambassador to Argentina upon the resignation of Noah Mamet on January 20, 2017. At the end of his term in May 2019, the Argentine government recognized him with the Order of the Liberator General San Martin, the highest honor conferred to non-citizens by the government of Argentina.

In 2019, he was hired by General Motors to lead its international government relations teams globally. In 2021, Cooney joined the board of directors of Global Ties Detroit, a non-profit that seeks to strengthen Detroit’s international partnerships. In 2023 he joined Capital Group to advise its global team of investors on international and geopolitical trends.

Diplomatic posts
Preceded by Noah Mamet	United States Ambassador to Argentina; Charge d'affaires 2017–2018	Succeeded by Edward C. Prado
