= Shrine Catholic Schools =

Coordinates: 42.5183°N 83.1898°W

Location
- Shrine Catholic High School & Academy: 3500 West Thirteen Mile Road, Royal Oak, MI 48073; Shrine Catholic Grade School: 1621 Linwood Avenue, Royal Oak, MI 48067

Information
- Type: Private, Coeducational
- Religious affiliation: Roman Catholic
- Established: 1941
- Founder: Charles Coughlin
- Principal: Sarah Cerone
- Grades: Preschool–12
- Enrollment: 247 (in highschool and academy) 828 (preschool-12) (2020)
- Campus size: 20 acres
- Colors: Navy blue and Gold
- Fight song: Shrine Victory Song
- Athletics conference: Catholic High School League
- Nickname: Knights
- Rivals: Madison Heights Bishop Foley
- Accreditation: Michigan Association of Non-Public Schools
- Newspaper: The Observer
- Yearbook: Spirit
- Tuition: $13,350
- Website: http://www.shrineschools.com

Shrine Catholic Schools is a private, co-educational Catholic school serving preschool through grade 12. It is located in Royal Oak, Michigan, and is affiliated with the National Shrine of the Little Flower Basilica.

The school consists of Shrine Catholic Grade School on one campus and Shrine Catholic Academy (middle school) and Shrine Catholic High School on another campus.

The school was founded as Little Flower High School, an all-girls school, in the late 1930s. The all-boys school, Shrine High School, was added later, and the schools were eventually merged.

== History ==
Father Charles Coughlin helped establish the institution while serving as one of the first Roman Catholic priests to preach to a widespread audience over the medium of radio during the Great Depression. His program became increasingly controversial as World War II approached, bringing national attention to the parish. The Bishop asked Fr. Coughlin to give up his radio show, which he did. The school maintained the name "Shrine of the Little Flower High School" into the 1960s, when it became "Shrine High School" until its latest name change in 2001.

== Academy & High School Campus ==
Shrine's 6th through 12th grade campus is located on 20 acres in Royal Oak, Michigan. Features of the school include a chapel, learning resource center, an academic and college counseling center, three science labs, a two-story visual arts lab, football field, 2 fitness centers, and a student center dining hall. A new field house and the new Sanders Auditorium are the result of a renovation on the schools campus. Current technology is found throughout the school. The school has recently renovated classrooms to help support the addition of 6th grade students into the academy.

== Athletics ==
Shrine participates in the Michigan High School Athletic Association (MHSAA) and is a member of the Catholic High School League (CHSL) in the Roman Catholic Archdiocese of Detroit. The school has placed 17 athletes into the CHSL Hall of Fame.

Shrine's sports include men's and women's basketball, golf, cross-country, football, men's hockey, men's and women's soccer, women's softball, women's volleyball, men's and women's track and field, men's baseball, women's skiing, and women's tennis.

=== State championships ===
Sport	Championship years
Boys' Golf	1950, 1952
Boys' Cross-Country	1973, 1974
Girls' Soccer	2019, 2022

== Notable alumni ==
- Kristen Bell (1998), actress
- Tom Cooney (1986), former senior U.S. State Department diplomat
- Mike Haggerty, former NFL football player
- Keegan-Michael Key (1989), actor and comedian
- Tom Lewand (1987), former executive vice president and chief operating officer of the Detroit Lions
- Connie Paraskevin (1979), four-time world champion track cycling champion
- Jim Seymour (1964), former NFL football wide receiver
- Bill Simpson (1970), former NFL football defensive back
- John Wangler (1976), former University of Michigan football quarterback
