= Sixth East Asia Summit =

- Host country: Indonesia
- Date: November 18–19, 2011
- Cities: Bali
- Participants: EAS members
- Follows: Fifth East Asia Summit
- Precedes: Seventh East Asia Summit

The Sixth East Asia Summit was held in Bali, Indonesia on November 18–19, 2011. The East Asia Summit is a nominally annual meeting of national leaders from the East Asian region and adjoining countries.

== Attending delegations ==
The heads of state and heads of government of the eighteen countries participated in the summit:

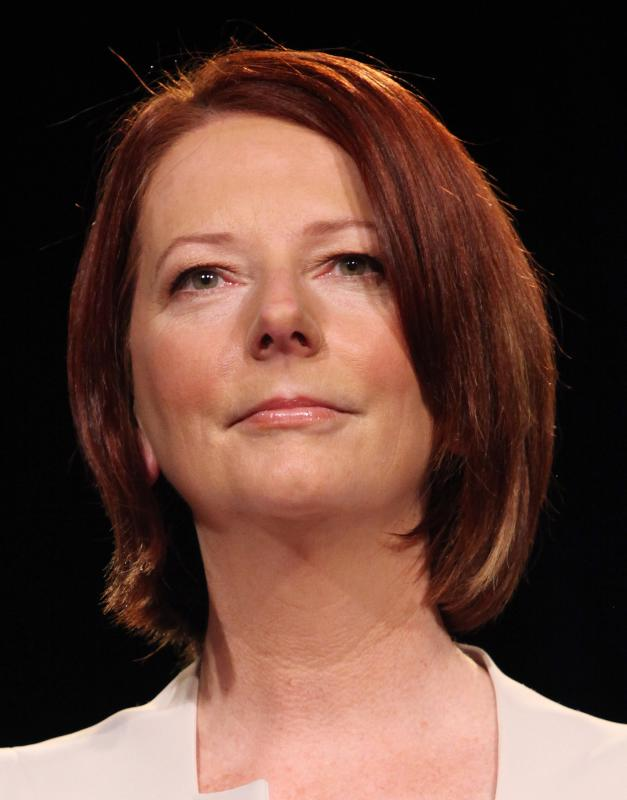
(Australia) Julia Gillard
Prime Minister

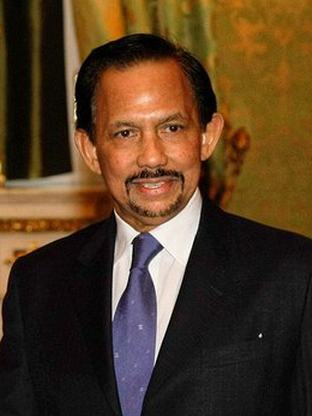
(Brunei) Hassanal Bolkiah
Sultan & Prime Minister

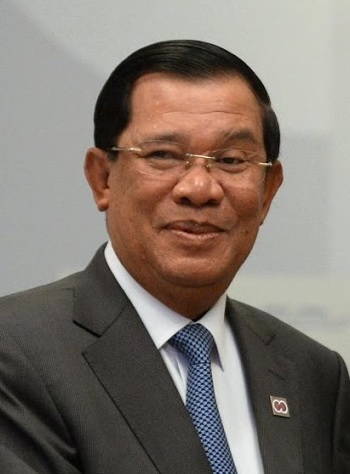
(Cambodia) Hun Sen
Prime Minister

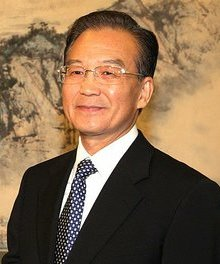
(China) Wen Jiabao
Premier

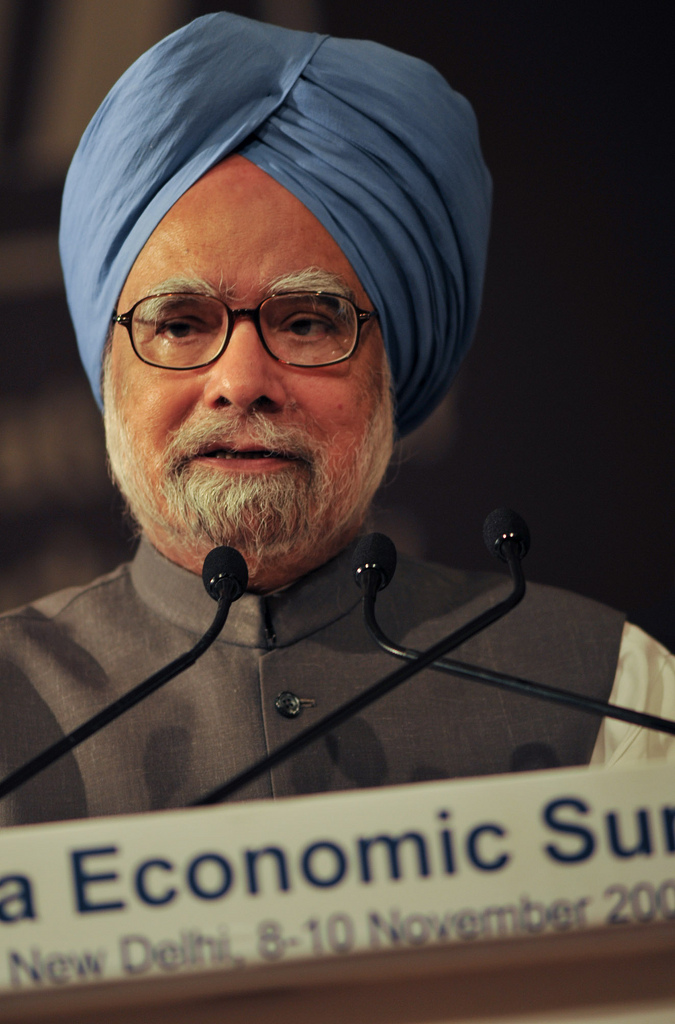
(India) Manmohan Singh
Prime Minister

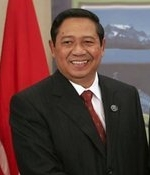
(Indonesia) Susilo Bambang Yudhoyono
President
(Chairperson)

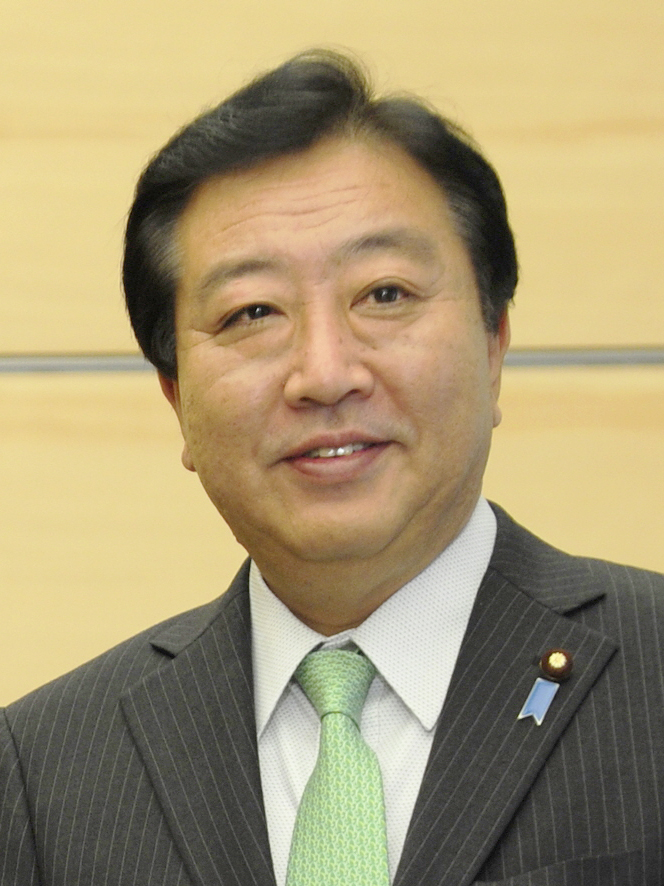
(Japan) Yoshihiko Noda
Prime Minister

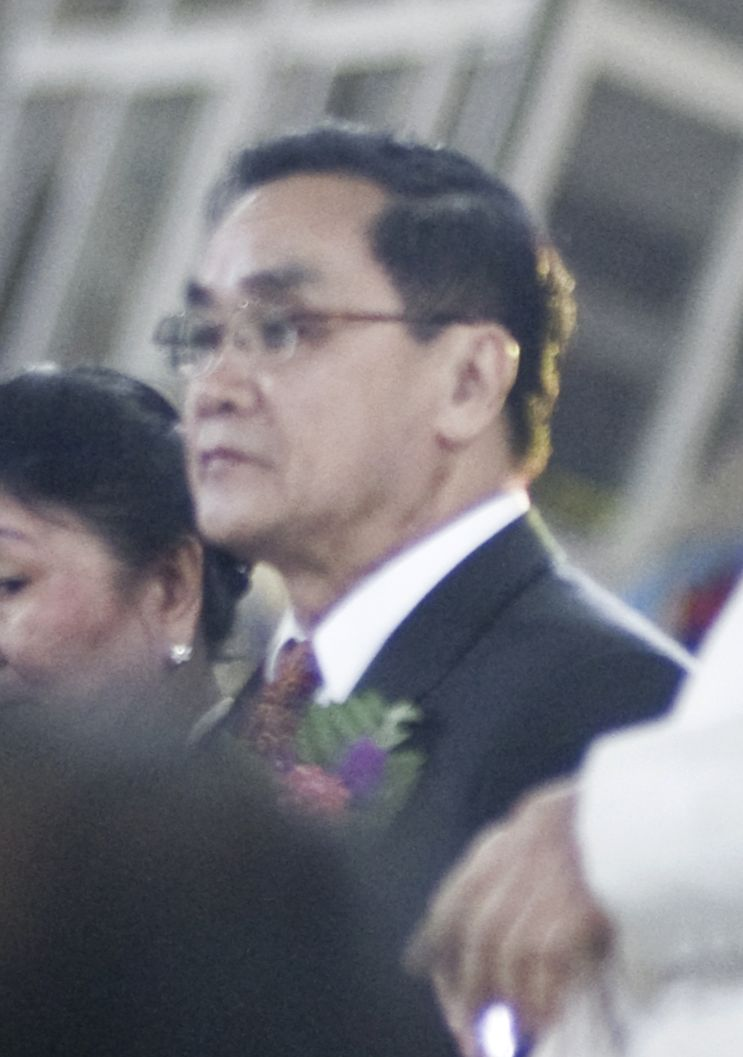
(Laos) Thongsing Thammavong
Prime Minister

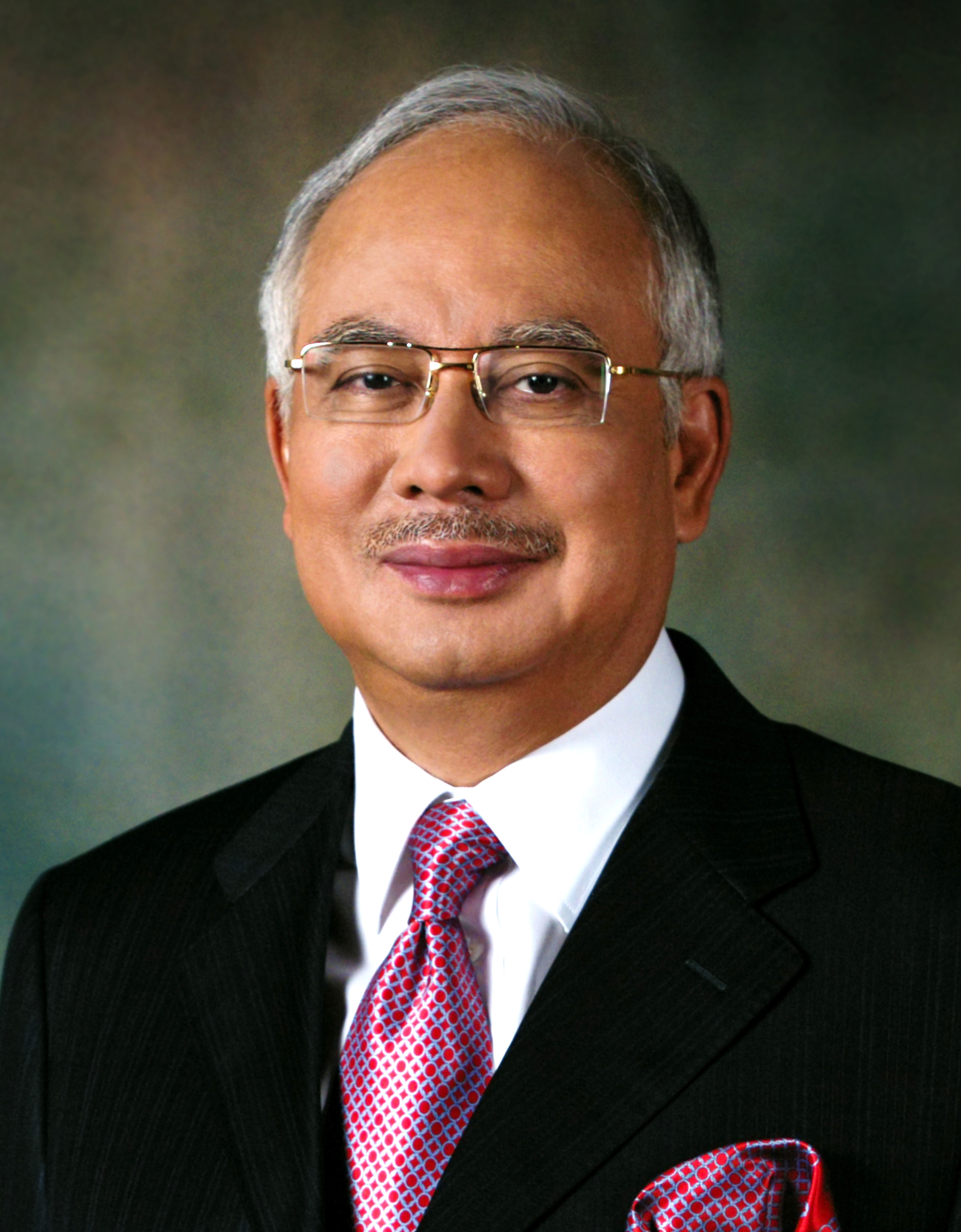
(Malaysia) Najib Tun Razak
Prime Minister

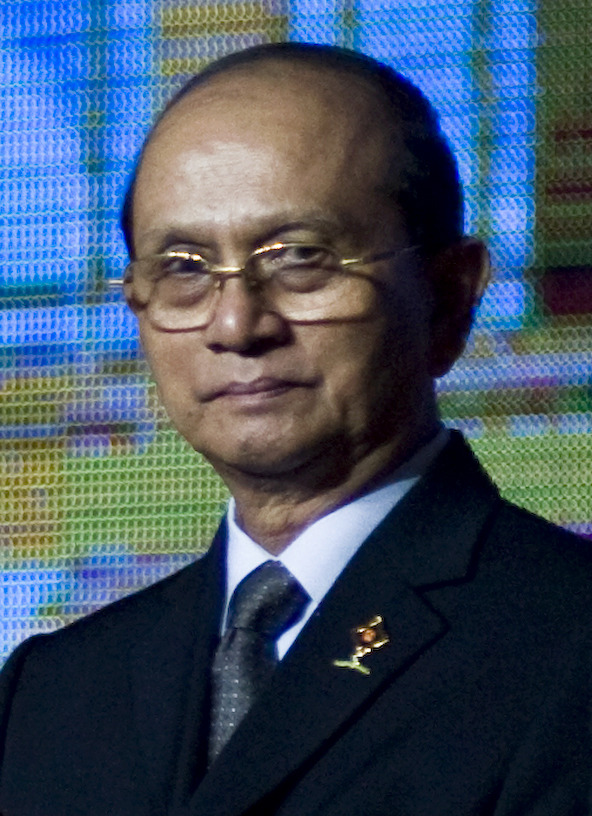
(Myanmar) Thein Sein
President

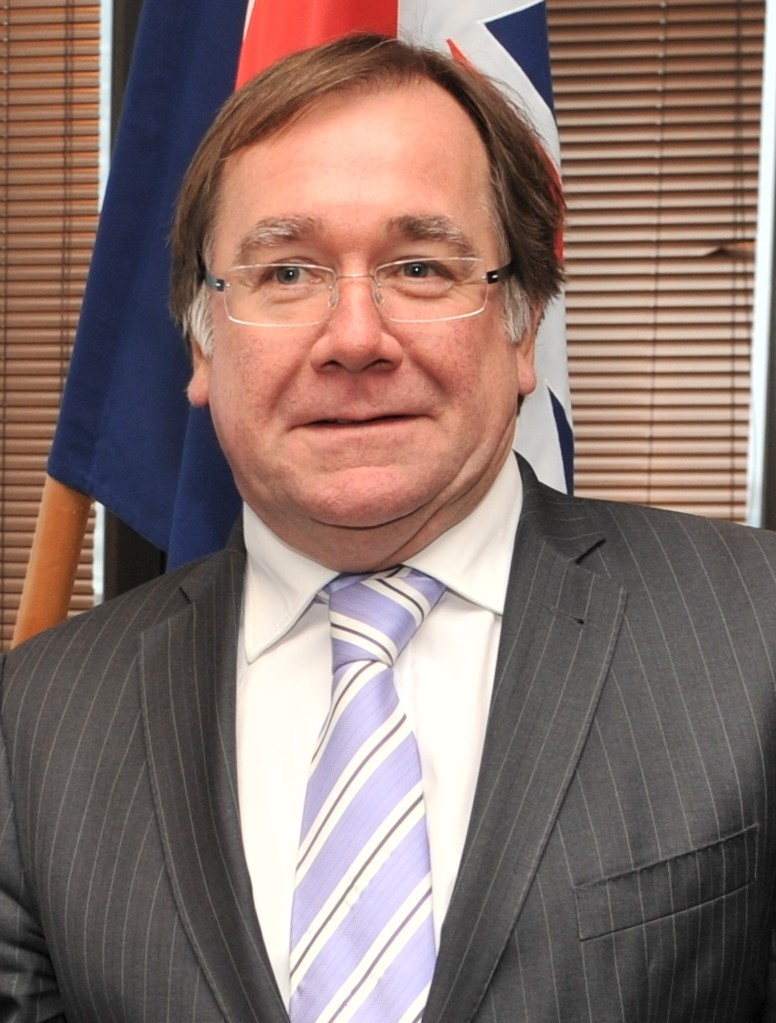
(New Zealand) Murray McCully
Foreign Minister

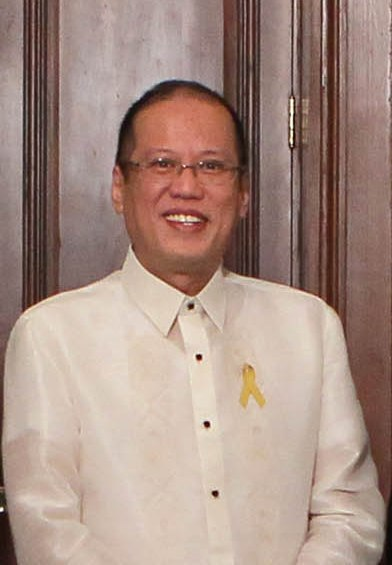
(Philippines) Benigno Aquino III
President

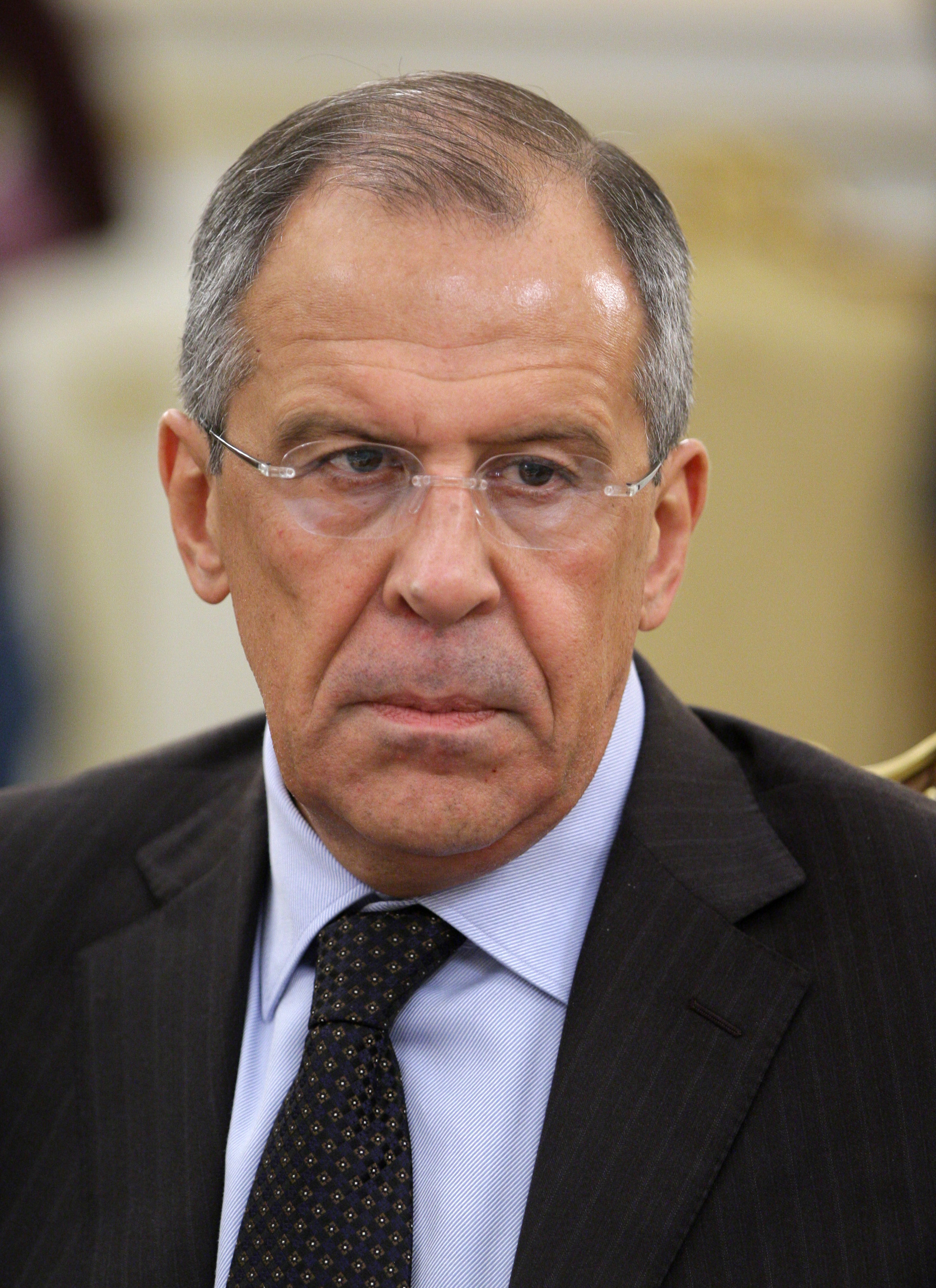
(Russia) Sergey Lavrov
Foreign Minister

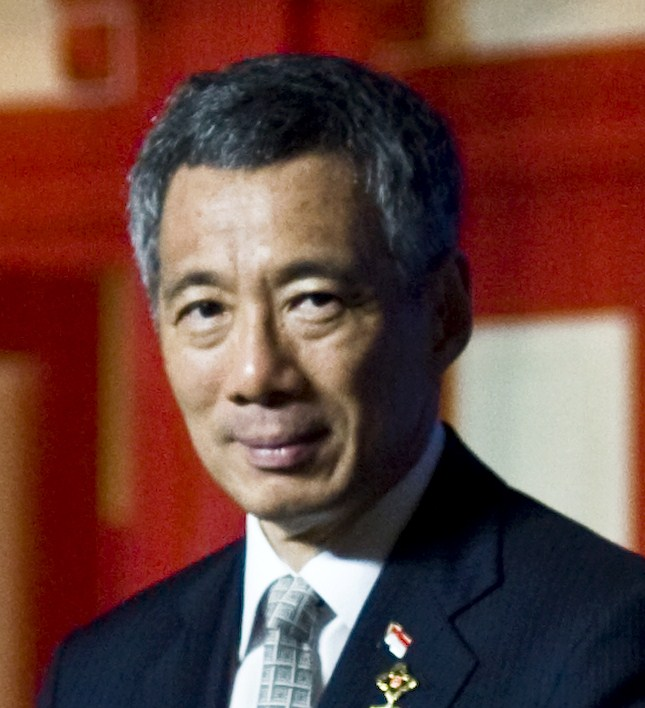
(Singapore) Lee Hsien Loong
Prime Minister

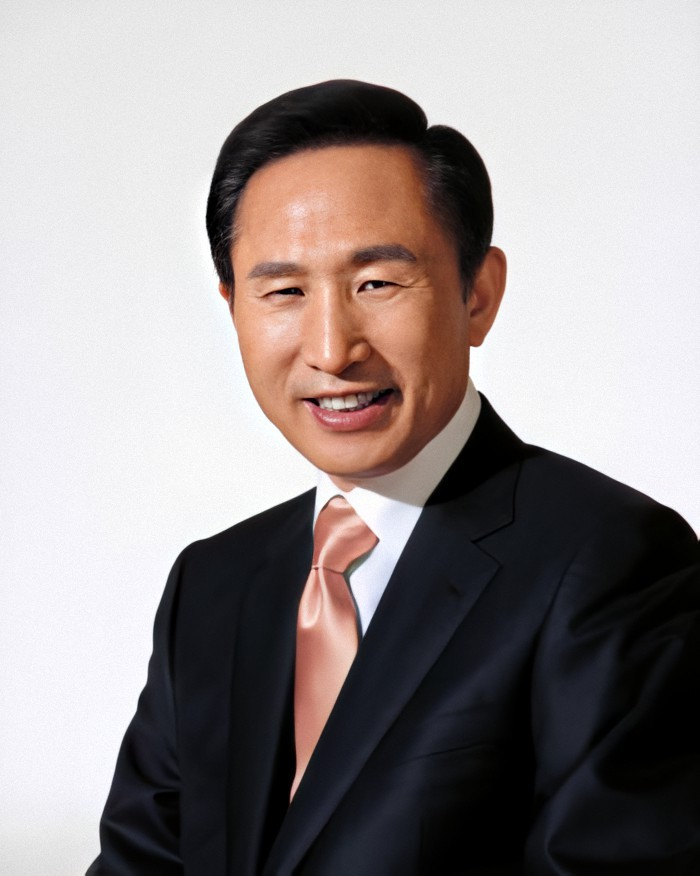
(South Korea) Lee Myung bak
President

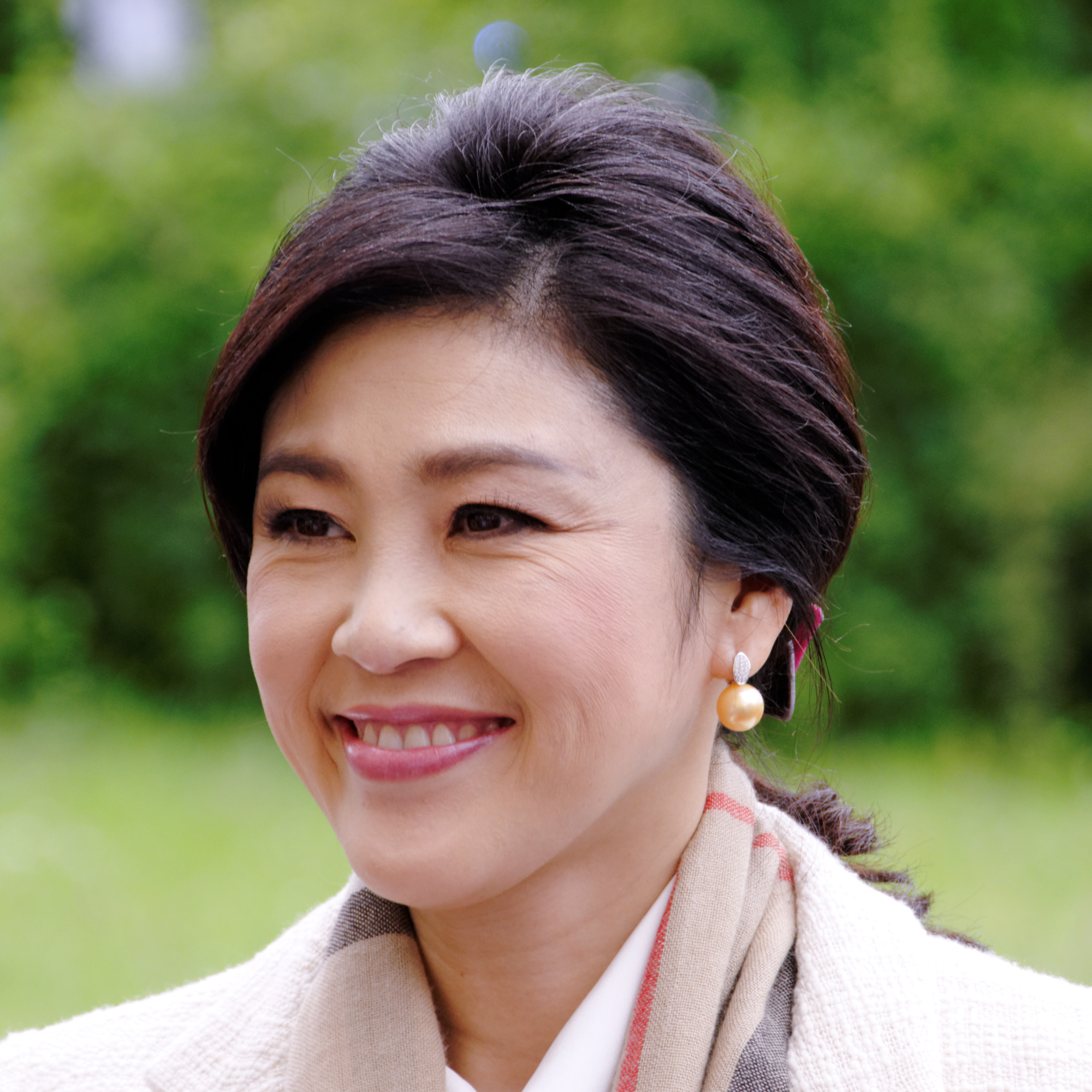
(Thailand) Yingluck Shinawatra
Prime Minister

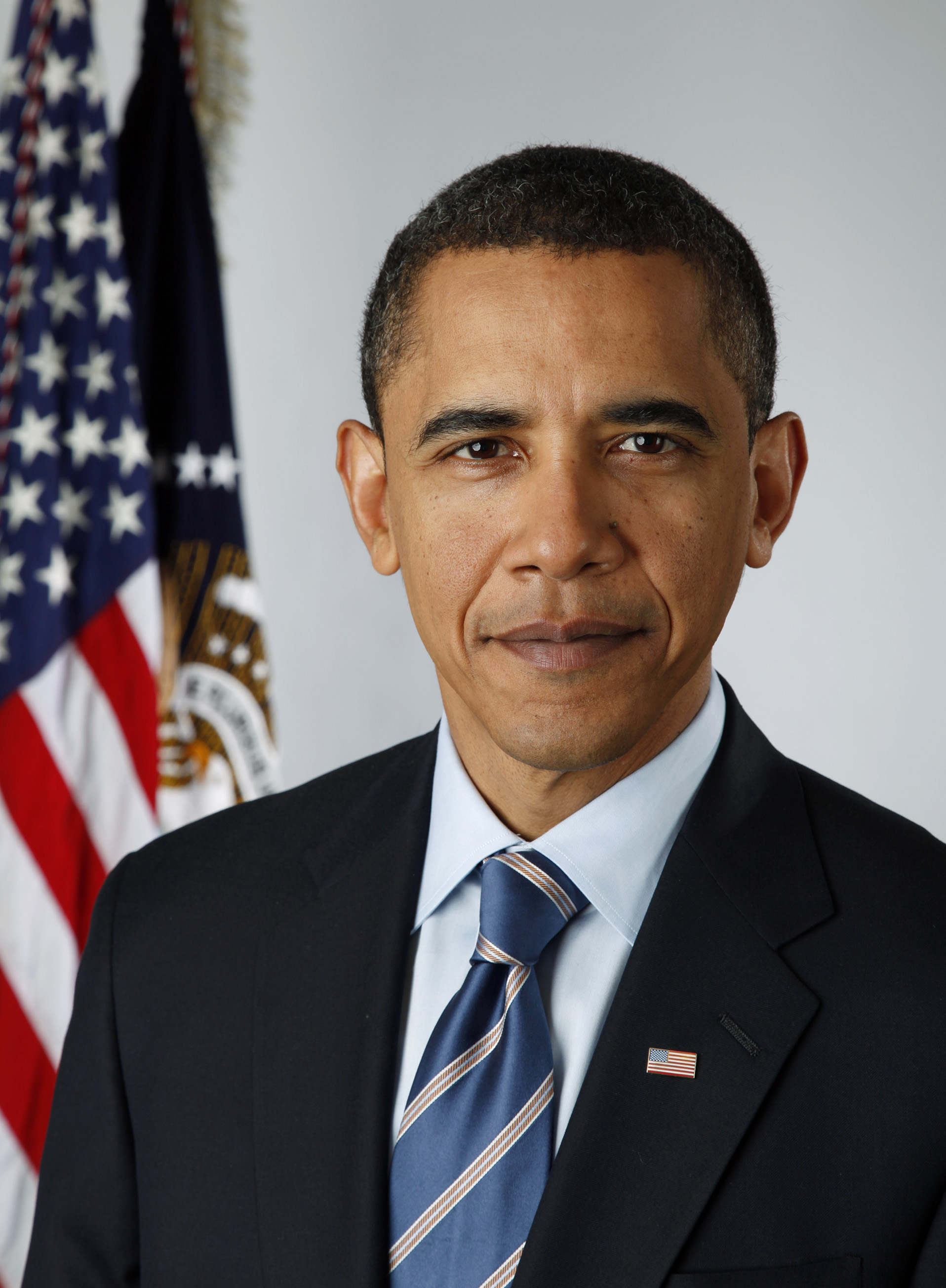
(United States) Barack Obama
President

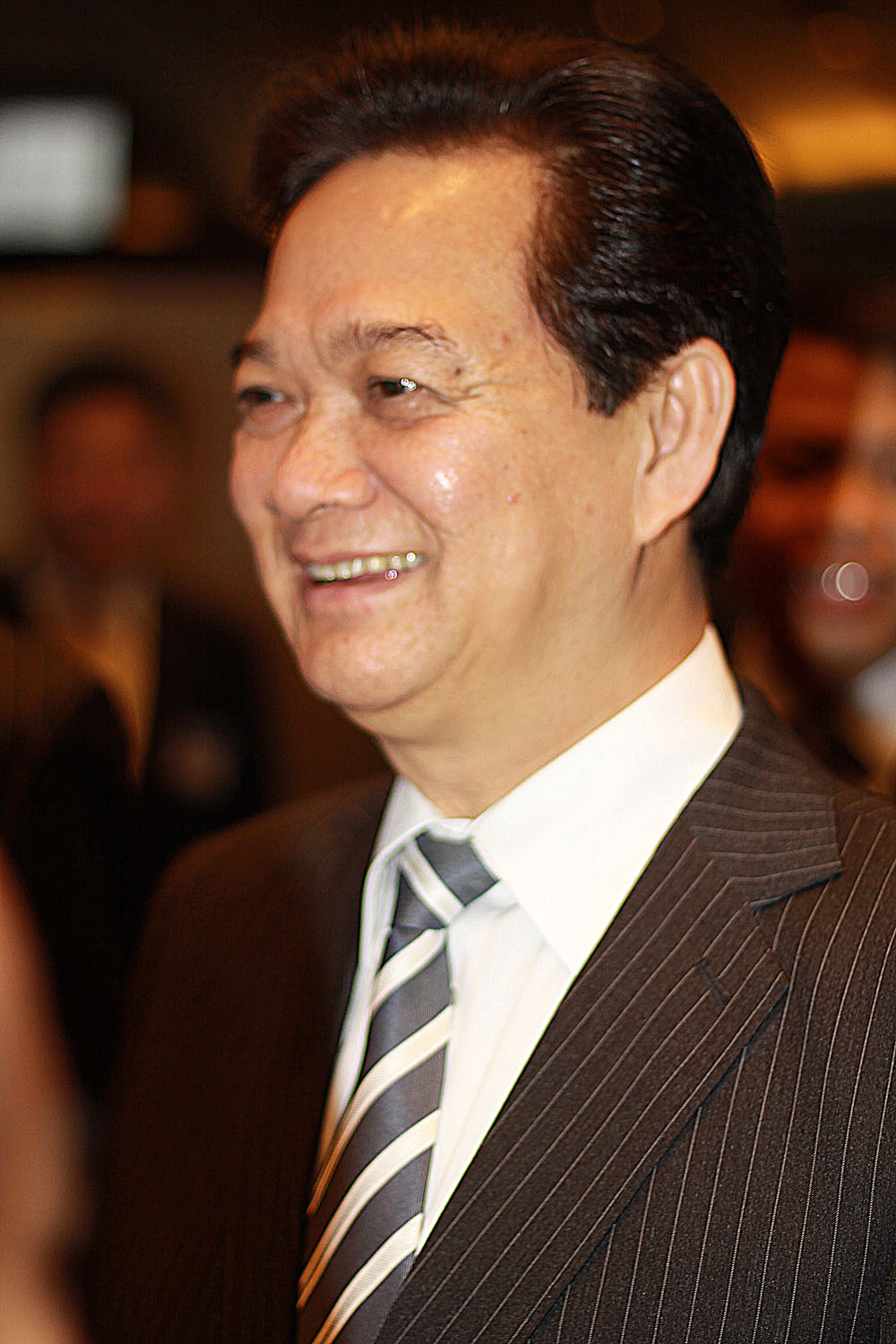
(Vietnam) Nguyễn Tấn Dũng
Prime Minister

== Agenda ==
The summit adopted the Declaration of the East Asia Summit on the Principles for Mutually Beneficial Relations, known as the Bali Principles, and the Declaration of the 6th East Asia Summit on ASEAN Connectivity, which made ASEAN Connectivity a key priority area of EAS cooperation.

=== US refocus ===
US President Obama made his inaugural visit to the Sixth East Asia Summit underlining the United States returned focus on the Asia Pacific region despite congressional budgetary constraints and cutbacks. This included expanded military presence in northern Australia which has neighbouring countries like Indonesia and China wary. Secretary of State Hillary Clinton will make the first official US trip to Myanmar (Burma) in more than 50 years.

=== US military training in northern Australia ===
Australian Prime Minister Gillard held discussions with Indonesian President Susilo Bambang Yudhoyono about United States military training hub in Darwin was not targeted any particular country and was there to help with disaster recovery and strengthen longstanding defence ties with the United States through ANZUS which is over 60 years old. President Susilo Bambang Yudhoyono also relayed to Australian Prime Minister Gillard, the defence exercises should involve ASEAN countries and also China to reduce tension and build trust.

The Australian Prime Minister has also held talks with Chinese Premier Wen to reduce concerns about the defence arrangement. She reiterated Australia always will have an ally in Washington and a friend in Beijing.

=== Regional maritime dispute ===
The United States has stated it supported multilateral talks on a regional basis to ensure disputes in the South China Sea is resolved peacefully even though it is not a party to any territorial dispute and claims to be not taking any sides. China reinforced its view the maritime dispute should be resolved bilaterally with all the countries involved rather than involving external forces which they see as interference and added layer of complexity. China sees the United States bringing the territorial dispute in the summit as a containment policy to counter China's growing economic and political influence within the region. China has continued to emphasize its peaceful rise and endeavors to work with neighbouring countries to reach agreements on maritime disputes.

The concerns of smaller countries about the growing influence of its northern neighbour has allowed the United States to become more involved in the region and coincide with some of their interests to counterbalance China. This also has the effect of countries having stronger individual voices to negotiate with China.

=== Myanmar ===
President Obama has said he is dispatching Secretary of State Hillary Clinton to Myanmar in the next few weeks to engage in dialogue about better ties with the United States. The Burmese government is civilian run since March 2011. The United States stressed China was advised of the visit and not replacing Myanmar's strong ties with China. They also stated China would want to see a stable Myanmar adjacent to its border and reduce risk such as political instability and refugees. China is a longstanding supporter of resource rich Myanmar and has provided financial and investment support. The Burmese government has reacted they will continue on the path of opening up through relaxing political restrictions and releasing political prisoners.

Myanmar has been chosen as host of the ASEAN summit to be held in 2014 despite concerns from human rights groups the reforms are not enough. Other countries have stated granting the chairing of the ASEAN conference will encourage the Myanmar civilian government to continue the pace of change in the country which has been economically and politically isolated by embargo and restrictions.

== Outcome ==
Russian President Dmitry Medvedev did not attend and was represented by Foreign Minister Sergey Lavrov. New Zealand Prime Minister John Key also did not attend and was represented by Foreign Minister Murray McCully. The other members' leaders attended.
