= USA pavilion at Expo 2010 =

Pavilion in Shanghai

Coordinates: 31°10′52″N 121°28′14″E

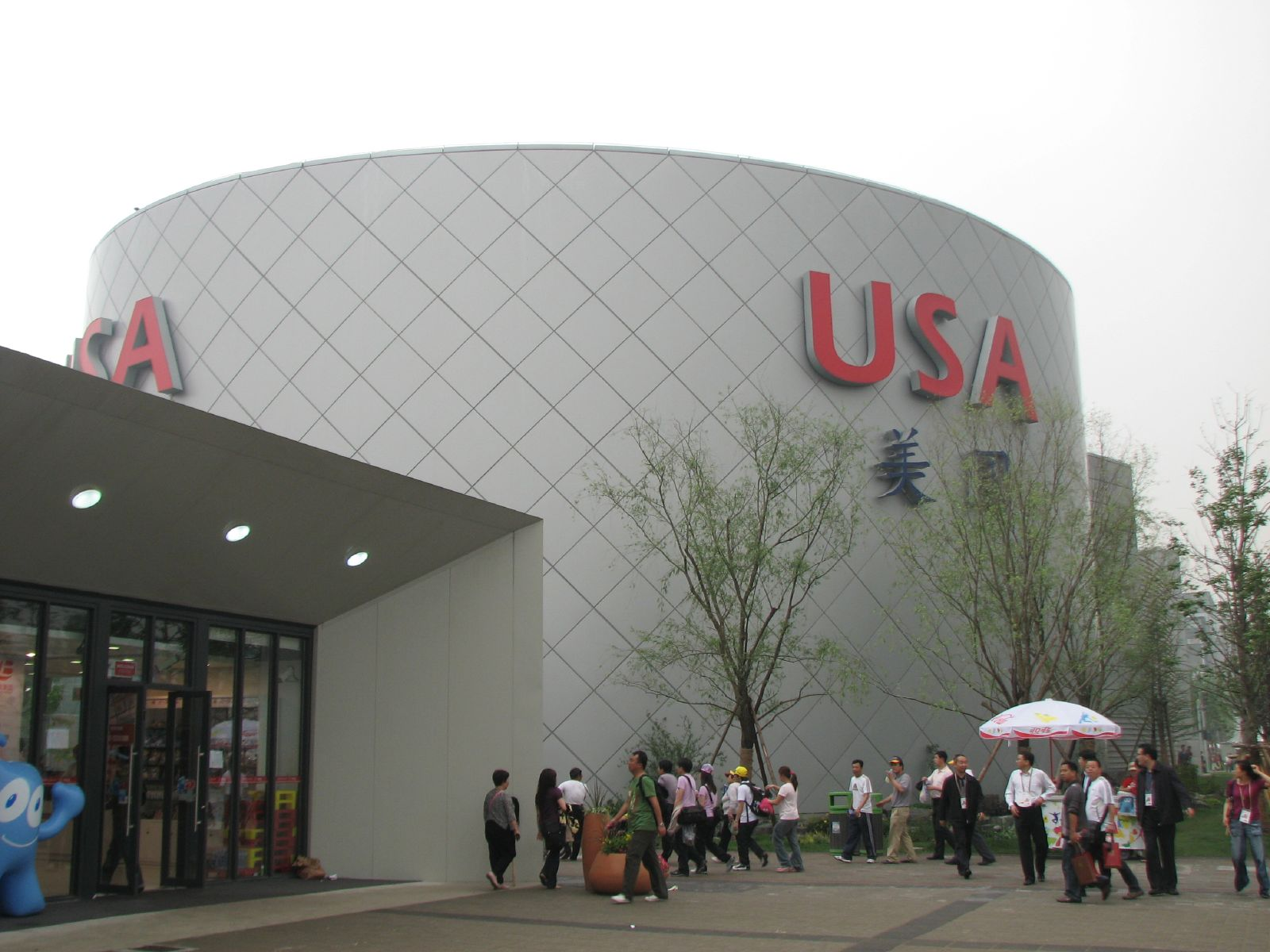
USA pavilion

The USA Pavilion was a pavilion at Expo 2010 in Shanghai, China. It represented the United States and was one of the most visited pavilions during the event.

== Attendance ==
As of August 31, 2010, the pavilion reported that attendance had surpassed 4.7 million and was averaging more than 41,000, people per day. On September 30, 2010, the pavilion welcomed its 6 millionth visitor. By the end of October, the USA Pavilion had received 7.3 million visits.

== Reception ==
The Chinese media reported that the pavilion's content and message left visitors to the pavilion with a lasting and memorable impression of "U.S. Spirit."

According to a Fudan University poll commissioned by the USA Pavilion, the pavilion was well liked by Chinese visitors. The Fudan University research study, posted October 14, 2010 on PRNewswire, found that the USA Pavilion met high visitor expectations and generated positive perceptions of Americans. In the study, 95 percent of respondents felt their visit to the USA Pavilions was worth the "time and effort" and 93.4 percent thought it was a good representation of the "American spirit."

However, a study conducted by Duke University business school professor Liu Kang, then acting as dean of the Institute of Arts and Humanities at Shanghai Jiao Tong University, gave "Thumbs down for US pavilion" and deemed it the "most disappointing" at the Expo According to Liu, "Maybe people had higher expectations so they left disappointed."

Reactions among US officials and US media were mixed. Secretary of State Hillary Clinton, the most senior US official to visit the pavilion, responded "It's fine," when asked to express an opinion on the structure and its programs. US Senator Richard Lugar, in a February 15, 2011 letter introducing a report on public diplomacy efforts in China, noted that the USA pavilion "drew criticism for its hastily organized presentations and lack of a cogent message."

A Los Angeles Times editorial commented that the mainly Chinese visitors to the pavilion enjoyed watching the American citizens in the pavilion's introductory film make fun of themselves as they attempted to learn simple Chinese greetings. The editorial also noted that "the pavilion is so loaded with corporate logos that the messages are nearly lost to branding by Chevron, General Electric and others."

The Washington Post reported that the pavilion was a hit among the Expo's mostly Chinese visitors. The same paper's Ezra Klein, however, summed up the pavilion's appeal to China visitors thusly: "We're bad at languages, in hock to corporations, and able to set up gardens when children shame us into doing so."

Reacting to US media focus on the pavilion's commercial sponsorship, National Public Radio (NPR, US) reported: "Some American visitors find it gauche, but the Chinese seem unperturbed by all the corporate messages." Reporter: "I talked to more than a dozen Chinese visitors. I asked them to resist their urge to be polite and give me a no-holds barred review. No one had a bad word to say. Here's visitor Zhu Shan Bin exiting the pavilion." Bin: "It shows us the American spirit, which is multi-cultural and filled with imagination and creativity. From the movies here, I see Americans value children and a good education." Reporter: "Now that is some brilliant corporate messaging."

Pavilion exit interviews by the Public Broadcasting Service (PBS, US) program News Hour found the audience pleased by what they saw, and commenting that it showed them another side of America, which was well worth the long lines endured to enter the pavilion. In a typical response, one woman interviewed by PBS NewsHour commented: "My View of America Changed…from what I saw, America seemed more sincere and friendly...right now, America and China, they are good friends."

== Themes ==
The pavilion's content was based on four core concepts: teamwork, sustainability, health, and the spirit of striving for success. Visitors passed through four spaces: a welcome hall, a pre-show, a main show, and a post show display area.

In the first hall, visitors were greeted in Mandarin Chinese in a series of vignettes featuring a cross-section of the United States' multi-cultural residents. The second space presented the "Spirit of America", promoting collaboration and celebrating opportunity, diversity, freedom, and innovation. The third space featured the main attraction, a 4-D film entitled "The Garden." In the fourth and final space, the pavilion's corporate sponsors displayed their emerging technologies and products.

"The Garden" told the story of a 10-year-old girl who envisions turning a blighted vacant city lot in her neighborhood into a beautiful, urban pocket park. The young girl encouraged her neighbors to come together to make the park a reality. In the process, she also created a closer community of neighbors. The eight-minute film was projected upon five 10-meter-high screens trimmed by programmable LED lighting effects (833 lighting cues in eight minutes). Audiences were especially captivated by the 4-D effects, which included lighting, mist, and vibrating seats.

These special effects combined with a non-verbal approach made the message universally understandable by all visitors, with no language barrier to interfere. As described in the "Beijing Review," the film, "With its 4-D wind and rain effects, gives audiences an amazing visual and tactile experience. Although there was no dialogue in the film, the excellent visual and audio effects make the film accessible to audiences with different cultural and language backgrounds."

== Show design ==
The show aspects of the USA Pavilion were conceived and produced by Bob Rogers (designer) and Tony Mitchell from a Burbank, California-based firm, BRC Imagination Arts, which has produced attractions and content for 11 world's fair presentations, including the film for the Vancouver Expo, "Rainbow War", which was nominated for an Academy Award ("Oscar").

== Plaza stage ==
In addition to the theater shows, entertainment was provided at the USA Pavilion on an ongoing basis with live performances by various US artists, including Dee Dee Bridgewater, Herbie Hancock, and Ozomatli. The Philadelphia Orchestra performed during the opening week of the Expo; Harry Connick Jr was featured at the pavilion's National Day celebration.

== Student ambassadors ==
Many visitors, bloggers and newspapers praised the role of the pavilion's "Student Ambassadors." Chosen through a national competition organized by the U.S.-China Institute at the University of Southern California, these Chinese-speaking university students were responsible for introducing exhibits, talking to visitors as they waited to enter the pavilion, working with visiting dignitaries and delegations, and participating in various community projects (e.g., a Habitat for Humanity effort). Several of these student ambassadors appeared on Chinese television and were interviewed by newspapers about their experience working at the Expo and living in the Expo Village.

== Celebrity guests ==
President Hu Jintao visited the pavilion a few days before the opening. In addition to many Chinese officials, notable guests included Quincy Jones, Robert De Niro, Patrick Stewart, Roger Federer, Adrien Brody, Diane Von Furstenberg, Halle Berry, Harry Connick Jr, Indra Nooyi, JW Marriott, Jeffrey Sachs, Anna Sui, and Maya Lin. NBA players Kevin Durant and Kevin Garnett visited, as did the presidents of University of Michigan, Northwestern University and a number of other colleges and universities. Other guests included former US President Jimmy Carter, Hillary Clinton, Al Gore, Gary Locke, Arnold Schwarzenegger, and Richard Daley.

== Architecture ==
The USA Pavilion was a gray steel structure designed to resemble an eagle with its wings outstretched to welcome pavilion visitors. The 60,000-square-foot (5574 sq. meter) United States Pavilion, constructed largely from glass and steel, was designed by Canadian architect Clive Grout. In May 2010, one on-line article criticized the exterior of the structure as unimaginative and resembling an ordinary office building. This simplicity in design was likely to have been the intent of the facility designer; in a February 2010 article in Fast Company magazine, Grout explained that, "We have not felt the need to do an architectural handstand to get attention."

== Funding ==
A lack of US Government funding has hampered US participation in World Fairs since the 1990s. Although the US had a pavilion at the 2005 Expo in Japan, there was no US official presence at the Universal Expo 2000 in Hanover, Germany.

It was widely reported in the press that American law prohibits or limits the spending of public money for participating in world's fairs. However, a persistent pavilion critic asserted that this was a State Department fabrication, part of the Bush administration's policy decision to privatize the US Pavilion. In his commentary on the internet blog, "Foreign Policy", Jacobson claimed that a 2006-2007 RFP process was aborted, and the US pavilion project was outsourced, in March 2008. He further claimed that, with initial difficulty finding support, in October 2008 the team reportedly received some undisclosed form of support from the US Consulate.

With the Obama administration replacing the Bush administration in the fall of 2008 election, newly appointed Secretary of State Hillary Clinton's first overseas trip was to East Asia. Clinton soon began efforts to raise the funds necessary to make the USA Pavilion a reality. Clinton's personal intervention and her fund-raising network are widely credited with helping the U.S. avoid the embarrassment of being a no-show at the largest world expo ever. She also recruited Jose H. Villarreal, a lawyer and Democratic Party fundraiser from San Antonio, Texas, to serve as Commissioner General. Thomas E. Cooney, Public Affairs Officer of the United States Consulate General Shanghai, acted as the Deputy Commissioner General.

The USA Pavilion at the 2010 Shanghai Expo was noted as the only national pavilion at the Expo solely funded by the financial contributions of approximately 60 multinational corporations. Sponsors—called "Marketing Partners" by Shanghai Expo 2010, Inc., the pavilion producers—include: Yum!, PepsiCo, Microsoft, Johnson & Johnson, Boeing, Procter & Gamble, The Walt Disney Company, General Electric, 3M, and Wal-Mart. A contribution of US$5 million from Citigroup completed the year-long campaign among corporations to reach the project's US$61 million funding goal, although additional corporate contributions (including from the American branch of Haier, China's largest household appliance manufacturer) continued to be raised. According to one reporter, the presentations and post show exhibits, their design, projection systems, sound systems, show sets, finishes, installation, training, etc. cost $23 million, or about $2.3 million per minute of entertainment.

In addition to funding the USA Pavilion, corporate America was present in several other venues. The food-court building adjacent to the USA Pavilion was managed by fast-food conglomerate Yum Brands, a USA Pavilion "marketing partner" (sponsor). Several US corporations who were not sponsors of the official pavilion built their own stand-alone pavilions in other areas of the Expo.

== See also ==
- Expo 2010
- Expo 2010 pavilions
