= Fifth East Asia Summit =

- Host country: Vietnam
- Date: October 28–31, 2010
- Cities: Hanoi
- Participants: EAS members
- Follows: Fourth East Asia Summit
- Precedes: Sixth East Asia Summit

The Fifth East Asia Summit was held in Hanoi, Vietnam on October 28-31, 2010. The East Asia Summit (EAS) is a pan-Asia forum held annually by the leaders of 16 countries in the East Asian region. EAS meetings are held after annual ASEAN leaders' meetings. The participants issued a Chairman's Statement called the Hanoi Declaration commemorating the fifth anniversary of the EAS and summarizing the summit's discussion.

== Attending delegations ==
The 16 countries participating at the head of state and head of government level were:

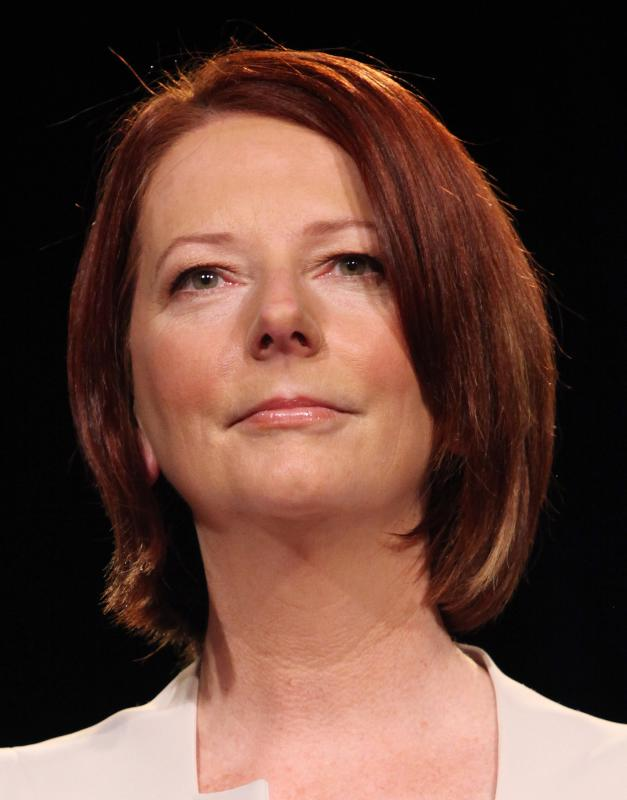
(Australia) Julia Gillard
Prime Minister

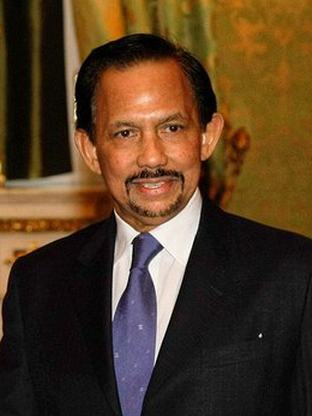
(Brunei) Hassanal Bolkiah
Sultan & Prime Minister

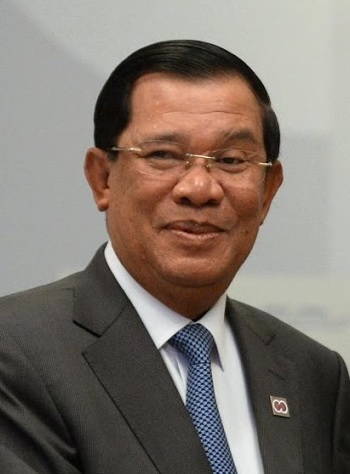
(Cambodia) Hun Sen
Prime Minister

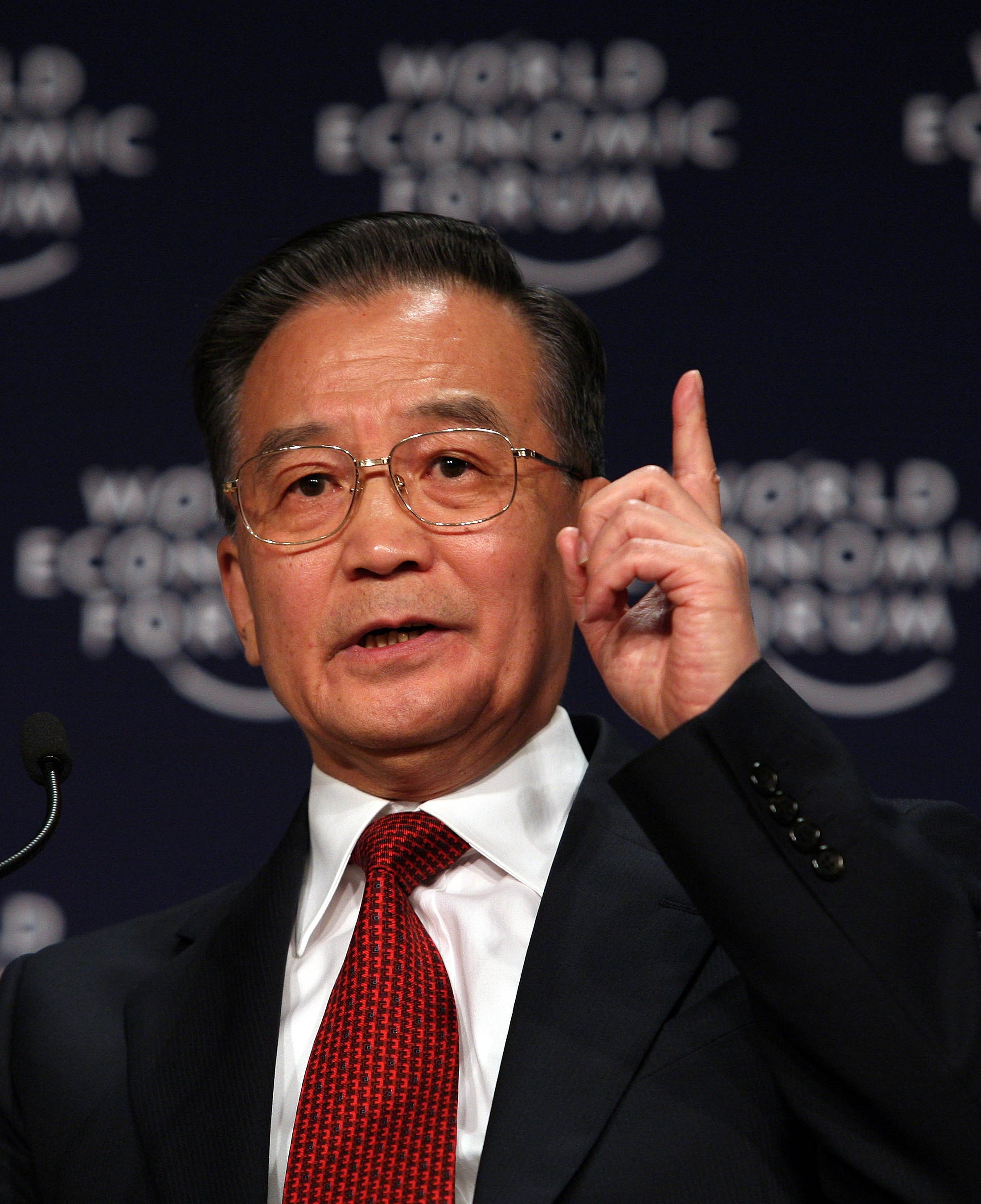
(China) Wen Jiabao
Premier

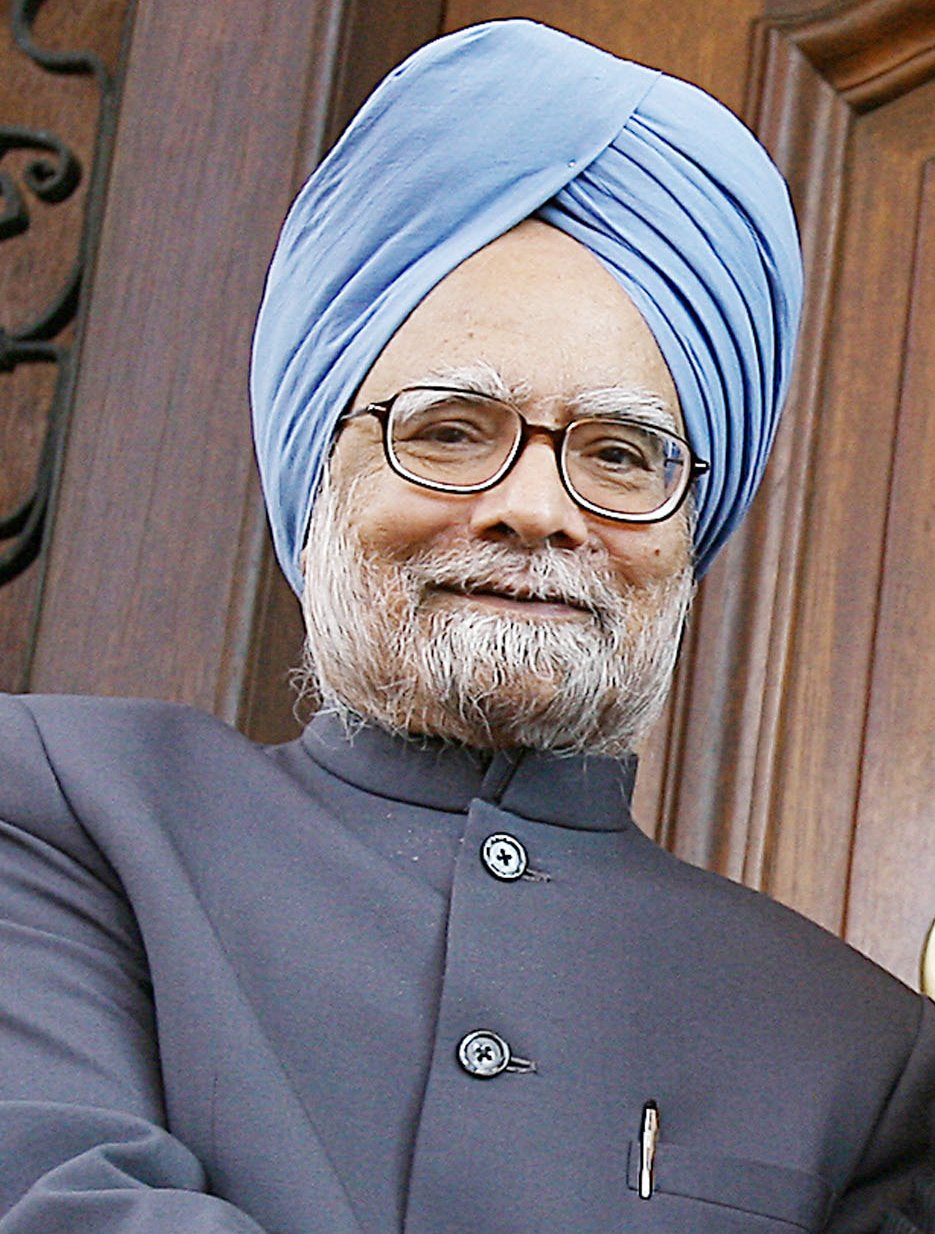
(India) Manmohan Singh
Prime Minister

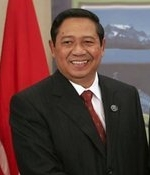
(Indonesia) Susilo Bambang Yudhoyono
President

(Japan) Naoto Kan
Prime Minister

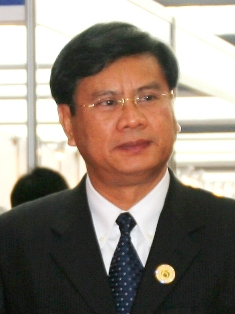
(Laos) Bouasone Bouphavanh
Prime Minister

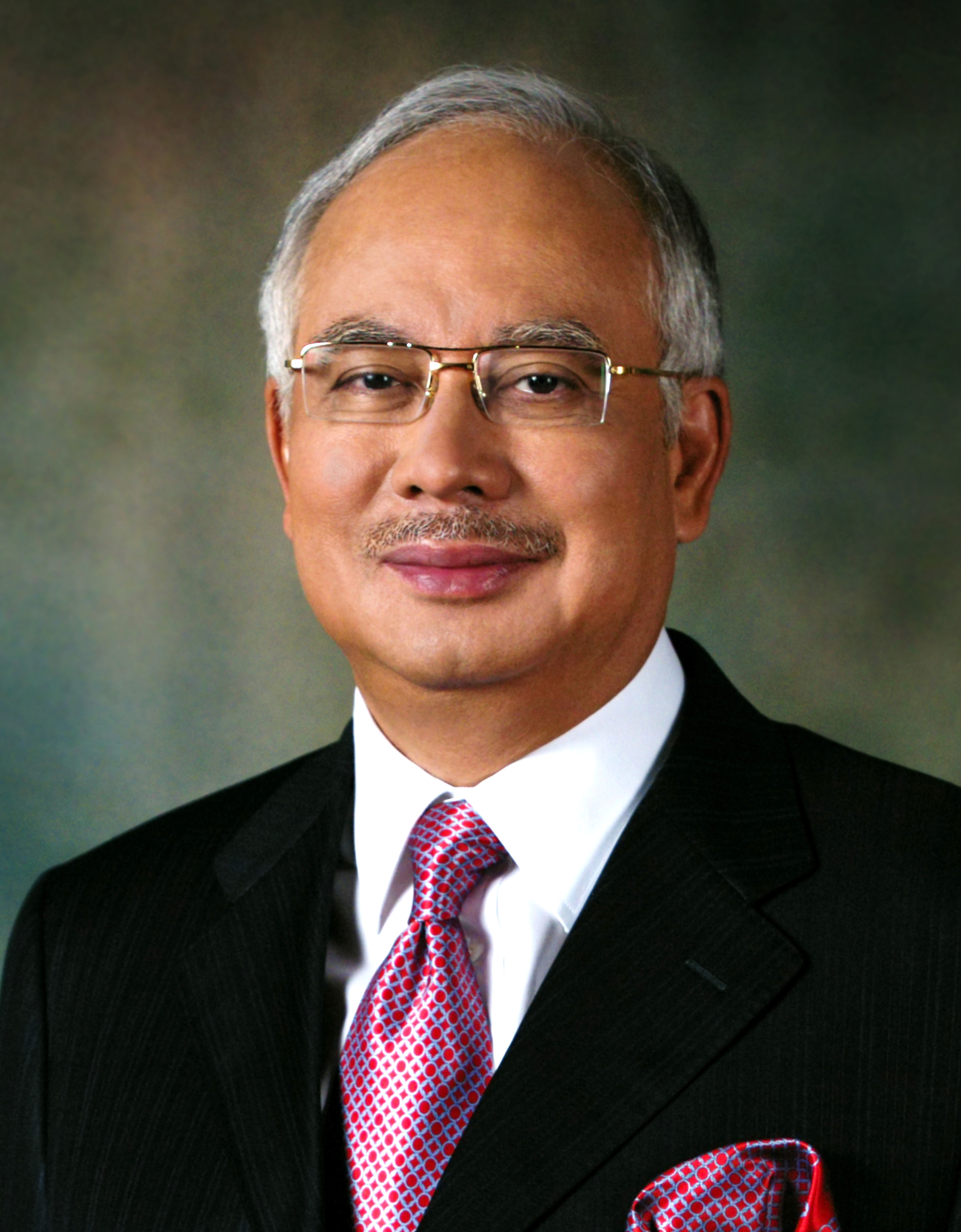
(Malaysia) Najib Tun Razak
Prime Minister

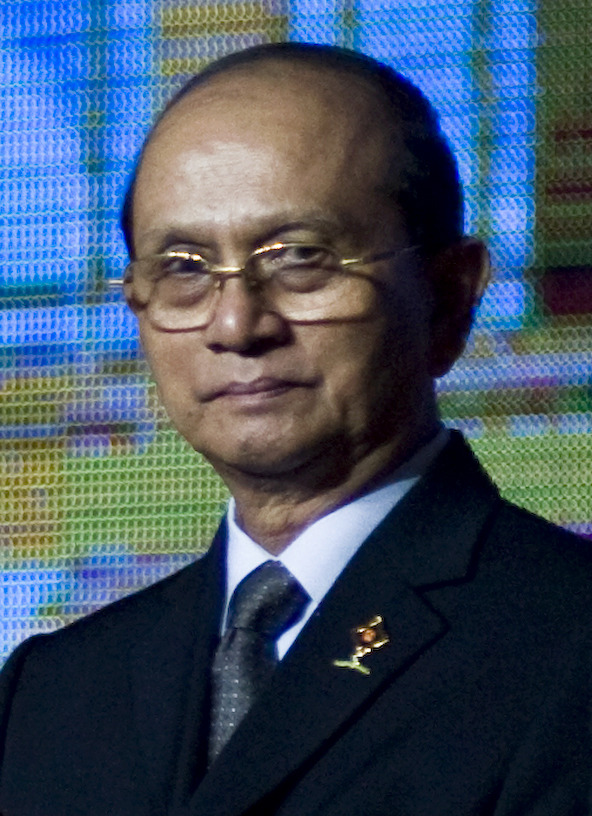
(Myanmar) Thein Sein
Prime Minister

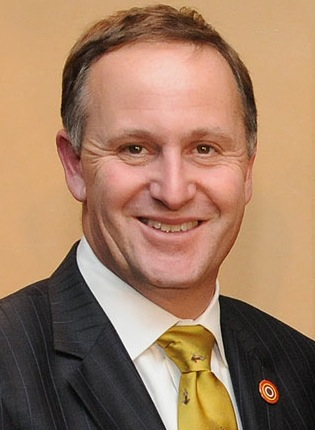
(New Zealand) John Key
Prime Minister

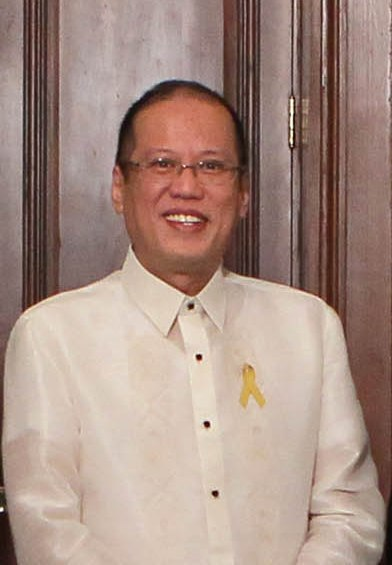
(Philippines) Benigno Aquino III
President

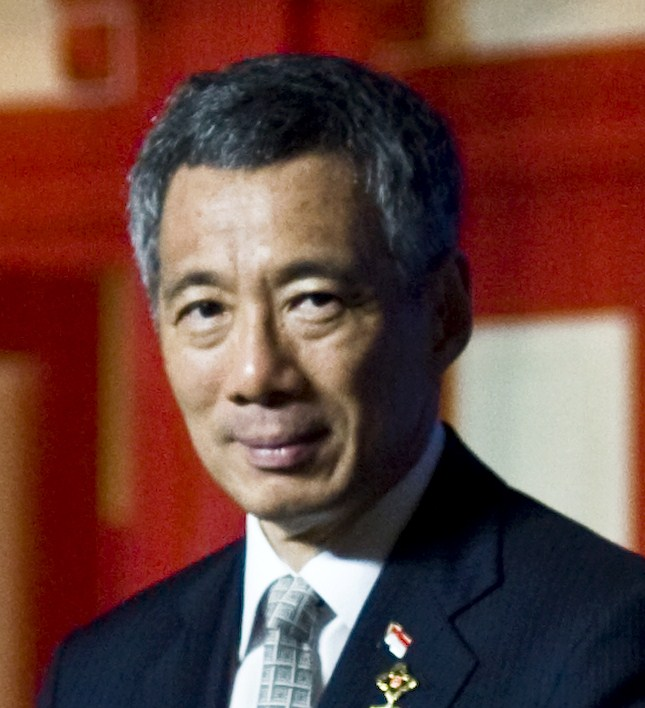
(Singapore) Lee Hsien Loong
Prime Minister

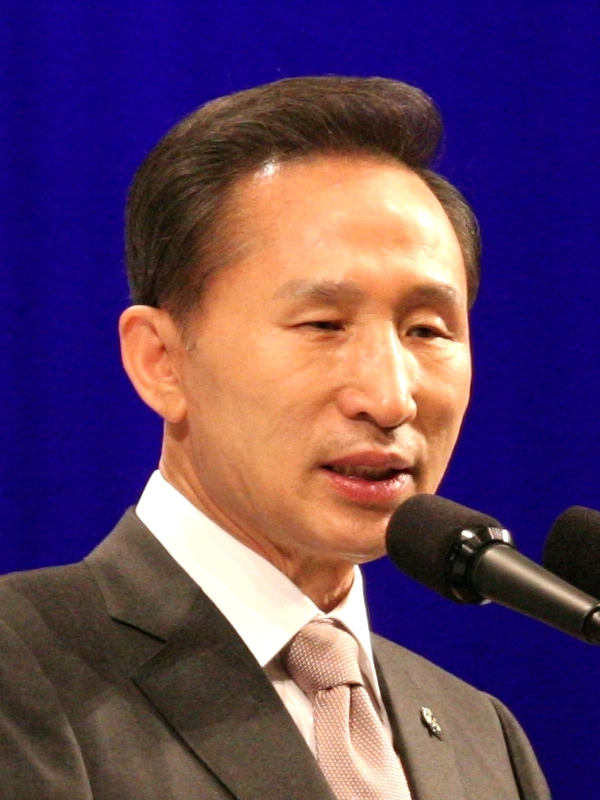
(South Korea) Lee Myung bak
President

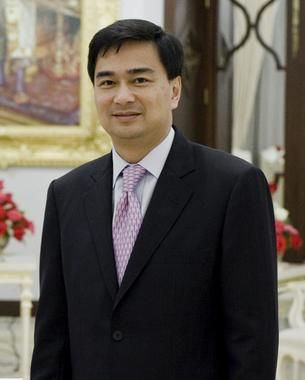
(Thailand) Abhisit Vejjajiva
Prime Minister

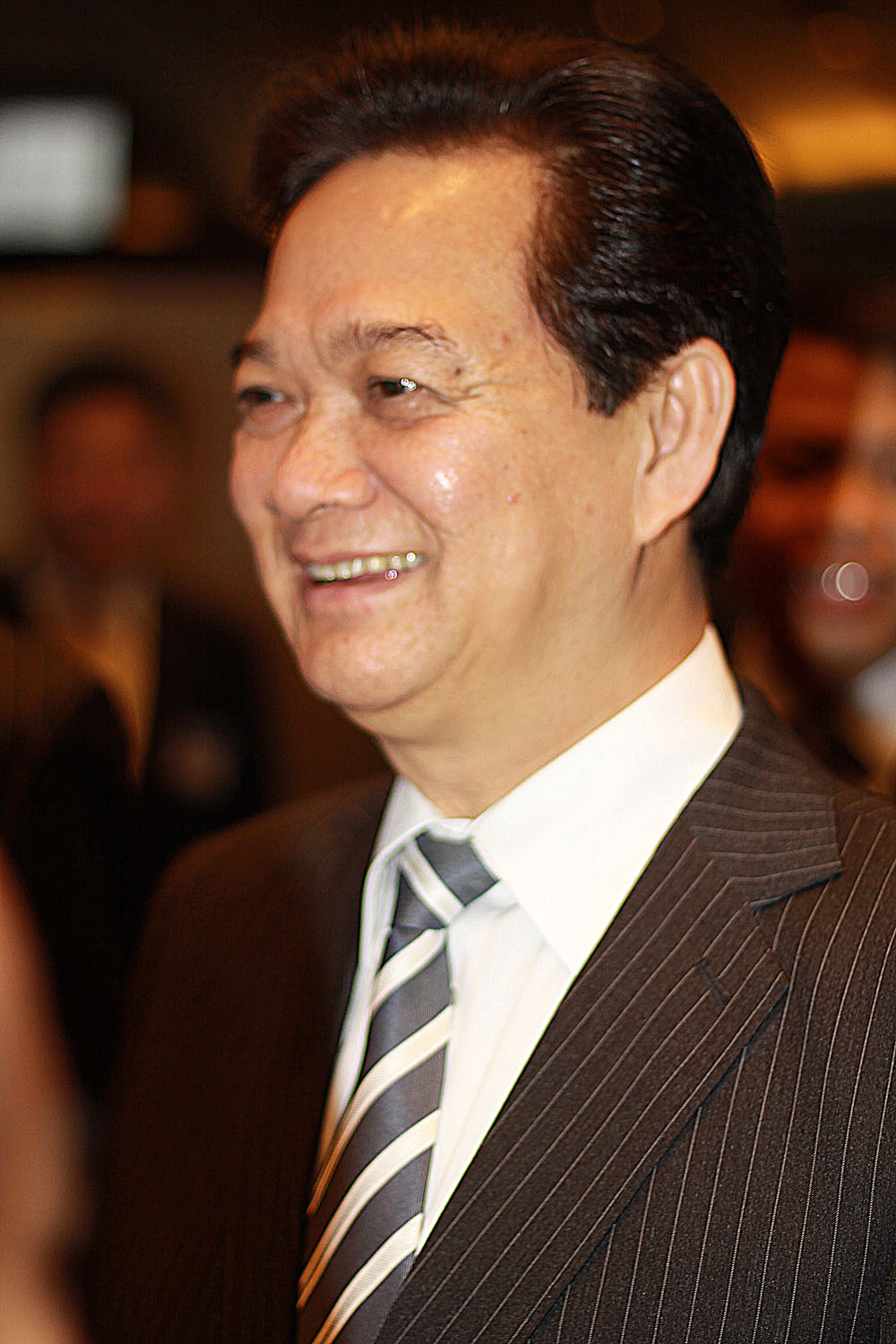
(Vietnam) Nguyễn Tấn Dũng
Prime Minister
(Chairperson)

Attending the summit also this year were representatives from Russia and the United States

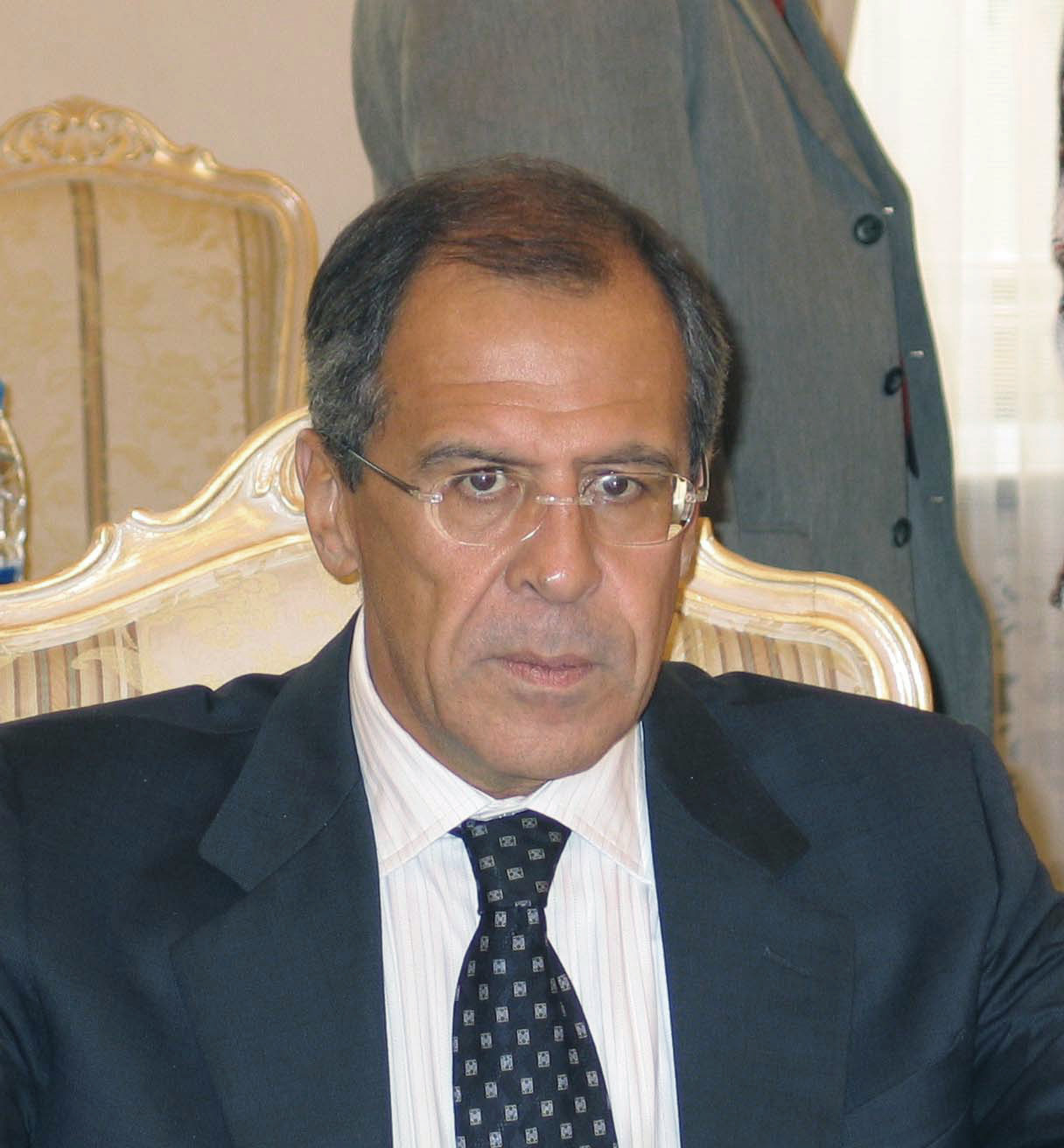
(Russia) Sergey Lavrov
Foreign Minister

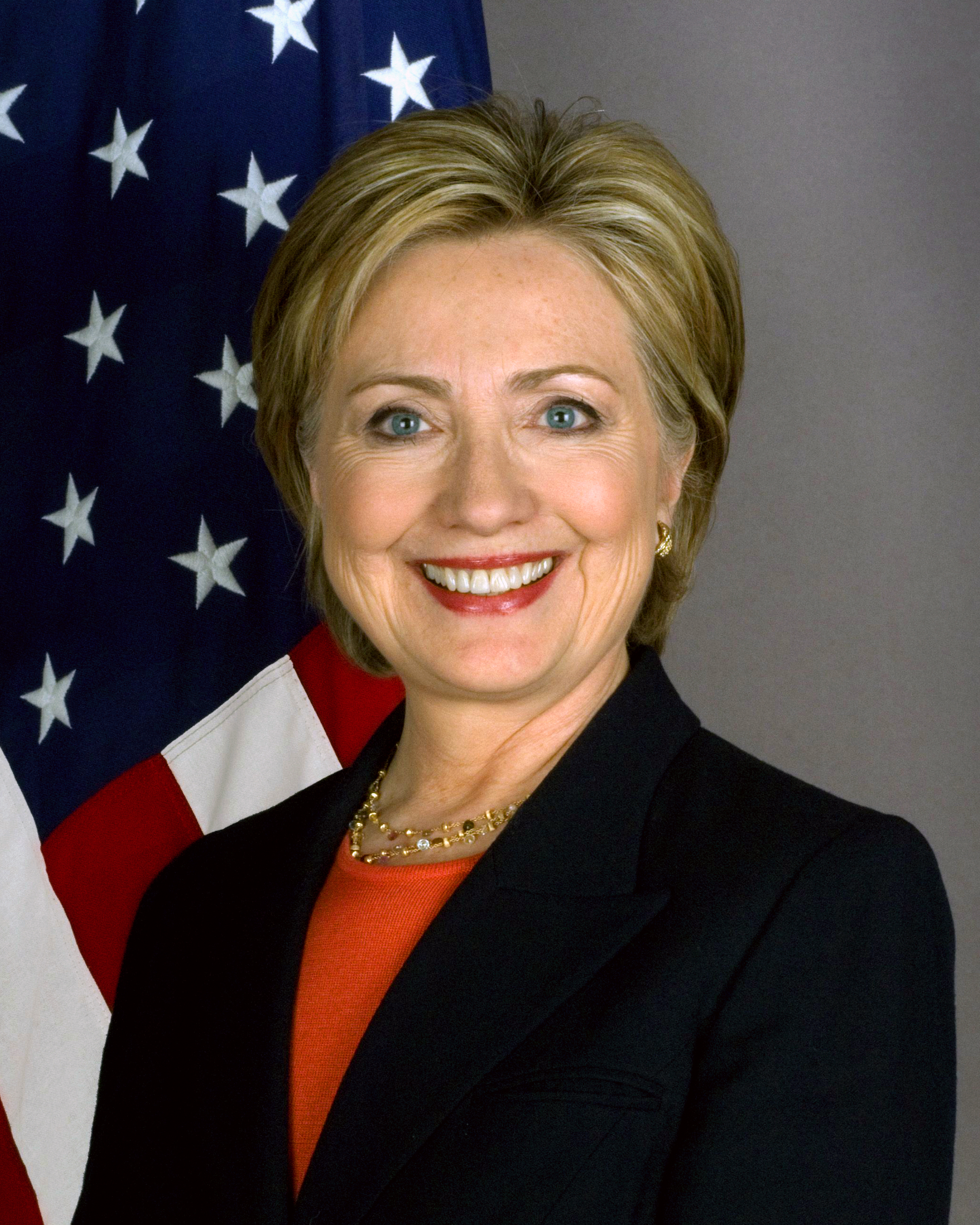
(United States) Hillary Clinton
Secretary of State

The United States and Russia attended the 2010 EAS as ‘Guests of the Host’ with formal entry at the head of state and head of government level scheduled for 2011.

The status of potential future members for the EAS was discussed in the Chairman's Statement of the 16th ASEAN Summit (9 April 2010) in these terms:

43. We recognized and supported the mutually reinforcing roles of the ASEAN+3 process, the East Asia Summit (EAS), and such regional forums as the ASEAN Regional Forum (ARF), to promote the East Asian cooperation and dialogue towards the building of a community in East Asia. In this connection, we encouraged Russia and the US to deepen their engagement in an evolving regional architecture, including the possibility of their involvement with the EAS through appropriate modalities, taking into account the Leaders-led, open and inclusive nature of the EAS.

== Agenda ==
The leaders exchanged views on regional and international issues and on the future cooperation in EAS.

=== East Asia Joint Research Fund ===
Japan has proposed a joint fund between the summit members to support science and technology.

=== Enhancing regional financial cooperation and coordination ===
A draft of the Chairman's statement called for the members to enhance regional financial cooperation and coordination in the face of the current fragile world economic recovery, but did not provide details of what this would involve.

=== Education ===
China has made reference to deepening educational exchanges through the Summit.

=== Issues identified by India ===
India identified the following issues for the summit:

- Energy, Environment, climate change and sustainable development
- Financial Cooperation
- Pandemics
- Natural Disaster Mitigation
- Education
- Comprehensive Economic Partnership for East Asia (CEPEA) and Economic Research Institute for ASEAN and East Asia (ERIA)

India will also brief the Summit on the Nalanda International University Project.

== Outcomes ==
The Summit issued the Ha Noi Declaration on the commemoration of the fifth anniversary of the East Asia summit. This confirmed the invitation to the United States of America and Russia.
