= Economic Research Institute for ASEAN and East Asia =

Economic Research Institute for ASEAN and East Asia
- Abbreviation: ERIA (Economic Research Institute for ASEAN and East Asia)
- Formation: 3 June 2008
- Type: International Organization
- Purpose: Providing policy recommendations to EAS Leaders
- Headquarters: Indonesia; Jakarta
- Region served: ASEAN and East Asia
- Official language: English
- President: Tetsuya Watanabe
- Staff: 160+
- Website: www.eria.org

The Economic Research Institute for ASEAN and East Asia or ERIA is an international organization established in Jakarta, Indonesia in 2008 by a formal agreement among Leaders of 16 countries in the East Asian region to conduct research activities and make policy recommendations for further economic integration in the East Asia. ERIA works very closely with both the ASEAN Secretariat and 16 Research Institutes to undertake and disseminate policy research under the three pillars, namely “Deepening Economic Integration”, ”Narrowing Development Gaps”, and “Sustainable Development” and provide analytical policy recommendations to Leaders and Ministers at their regional meetings. ERIA provides intellectual contributions to East Asian Community building and serves as a Sherpa international organization. ERIA Ranks 9th among the world's "Top International Economics Think Tanks" according to the 2020 Global Go To Think Tanks Index Report conducted by the University of Pennsylvania.

== Establishment ==
ERIA was established by a formal agreement among Leaders of 16 countries in the East Asian at the 3rd East Asia Summit in Singapore on 21 November 2007. The inaugural ERIA Governor Board meeting was held at the ASEAN Secretariat in Jakarta, Indonesia, on 3 June 2008. A formal agreement was reached between Government of the Republic of Indonesia and the ASEAN Secretariat to recognize ERIA as an international organization on 30 December 2008. As for the preparation for the establishment of ERIA, IDE-JETRO has been appointed to undertake a role as the temporary secretariat of ERIA at ERIA Expert Meeting in manila, March 2007 towards its official establishment.

== History ==
The inaugural meeting of the ERIA was held on 3 June 2008 in Indonesia.

In 2009 it was said that ERIA was working on a master plan for Asia. The plan aims to maximize industrialization through the development of much needed infrastructure.

- January, 2007 The proposal to establish ERIA was welcomed by all leaders in East Asia at 2nd East Asia Summit in Sebu.
- November, 2007 Establishment of ERIA was agreed at the 3rd East Asia Summit in Singapore.
- June 3, 2008 ERIA Inaugural meeting (1st Governing Board Meeting) was held.
- December 30, 2008 ERIA was recognized as International Organization.

=== Establishment of ERIA approved ===
The formal establishment of ERIA was agreed upon by all the leaders at the 3rd East Asia Summit on November 21, 2007, in Singapore.

Excerpt from Chairman's Statement of the 3rd East Asia Summit (Paragraph 13)

We agreed to the establishment of the Economic Research Institute of ASEAN and East Asia (ERIA) to be accommodated temporarily at the ASEAN Secretariat. We welcomed the report submitted to us by the Expert Group, which focuses on research topics of strategic interest to the EAS countries. We encouraged the Expert Group to continue its research work and we looked forward to practical policy recommendations to further regional integration and strengthen partnerships in East Asia.

=== Inauguration of ERIA ===
The inauguration was held at the ASEAN Secretariat on June 3, 2008, in Indonesia. Attendees included board members nominated from 16 countries in East Asia. ERIA launched as a full-fledged research activity body.

The Statement on the Establishment of ERIA
1. The Economic Research Institute for ASEAN and East Asia (ERIA) will be temporarily accommodated at the ASEAN Secretariat.
2．ERIA shall function as an independent research institute but shall maintain and develop strong communication ties with policy-making process. The results of its research works shall produce concrete and tangible policy recommendations that shall meet the needs of Ministerial and National Leader’s meetings.
3．ERIA shall maintain its highest academic standards in its research activities and provide a tripartite-type forum for policy dialogue and interactions among researchers, policymakers, and civil society.
4．ERIA shall provide meaningful resources for narrowing development gaps and enhancing research capabilities in countries in need for improvement of public policy-making and research abilities.
5．ERIA shall function as a common asset to the ASEAN and East Asian countries in providing a common platform for rigorous economic studies, and its activities shall be open in cooperation with various prominent economic research institutions and organizations around the world, just as the East Asian economic integration shall be wide open.

=== Endorsement of ERIA as an international organization ===
Following the agreement at the 3rd EAS meeting, formal agreement to endorse the status of ERIA as an International Organization was concluded on December 30, 2008, between the Indonesian Government and ASEAN Secretariat. Basis for Privileges and Immunities including Tax Exemption finalized.

=== Financial contribution to ERIA ===
There have been announcements of contributions to ERIA from the following countries in addition to Japan.

- New Zealand: June 26, 2009, New Zealand
- India: October 25, 2009, India
- Australia: November 13, 2009, Australia
- IndonesiaMalaysiaPhilippinesSingaporeThailandBruneiVietnamLaosMyanmarCambodia: November 19, 2011, 10 ASEAN member countries expressed their contribution.

== Organization ==
=== Governing board members ===
The governing board is the supreme decision-making body of ERIA. The governing board consists of 17 members, which includes the secretary general of ASEAN and 16 other members (each representing a member country) from various backgrounds such as academics, policy making and business.

- Dato Paduka Lim Jock Hoi, secretary general of ASEAN
- Australia: Ms Elisabeth Bowes (First Assistant Secretary and Chief Negotiator, Regional Trade Agreements Division, Department of Foreign Affairs and Trade)
- Brunei : Mr Hairol Nizam Hamid (Acting Director General, Department of Economic Planning and Statistics, Ministry of Finance and Economy)
- Cambodia: H.E. Ros Seilava (Secretary of State, Ministry of Economy and Finance of Cambodia; Member of Supreme National Economic Council)
- China: Prof Ye Hailin (Vice Dean of National Institute of International Strategy, Chinese Academy of Social Sciences)
- India: Mr Rohan Shah (Practising counsel in Supreme Court and Bombay High Court)
- Indonesia: Dr Teguh Dartanto (Dean of Faculty of Economics and Business University of Indonesia)
- Japan: Mr Sadayuki Sakakibara (Executive Advisor to the Ministry of Economy, Trade, and Industry; former chairman of Nippon Keidanren (Japan Business Federation))
- South Korea: Mr Tae-Shin Kwon (Vice Chairman and CEO, the Federation of Korean Industries)
- Laos: Dr Leeber Leebouapao (Chairman of the Planning, Finance, and Audit Committee, National Assembly of Lao PDR)
- Malaysia: Prof Tan Sri Dato’ Seri Dr Noor Azlan Ghazali (Head of the Economics and Management Cluster at the National Council of Professors; Professor of Economics at Universiti Kebangsaan Malaysia (UKM)-Graduate School of Business; Director of Malaysian Inclusive Development and Advancement Institute (MINDA-UKM))
- Myanmar: H.E. Dr Wah Wah Maung (Deputy Minister of the Ministry of Investment and Foreign Economic Relations)
- New Zealand: Dr Alan Bollard (Professor of Practice at the Victoria Business School, former executive director of the APEC Secretariat, former governor of the Reserve Bank of New Zealand)
- Philippines: Dr Cielito F Habito (Professor of Economics at the Ateneo de Manila University, Chairman of Brain Trust Inc., and Former Secretary (Minister) of Socioeconomic Planning of the Philippines)
- Singapore: Ambassador Barry Desker (Distinguished Fellow & Bakrie Professor of Southeast Asia Policy, S. Rajaratnam School of International Studies, Nanyang Technological University)
- Thailand: Dr Sansern Samalapa (Vice Minister for Commerce of Thailand)
- Vietnam: Dr.Tran Thi Hong Minh (president, Central Institute for Economic Management (CIEM))

=== Research Institute Network RIN from 16 countries ===
The Research Institutes Network consists of research institutes from 16 East Asia Summit countries. MOU was signed between Research Institute Network, on February 24, 2009, in Thailand. RIN recognized the extensive efforts for carrying out a series of ERIA’s research project.

- Australia: Australian National University (ANU)
- Brunei: Brunei Darussalam Institute of Policy & Strategic Studies (BDIPSS)
- Cambodia: Cambodian Institute for Cooperation and Peace (CICP)
- China: National Institute of International Strategy, Chinese Academy of Social Science (CASS)
- India: Research and Information System for Developing Countries (RIS)
- Indonesia: Centre for Strategic and International Studies (CSIS)
- Japan: Institute of Developing Economies (IDE/JETRO)
- Korea: Korea Institute for International Economic Policy (KIEP)
- Lao PDR: National Institute for Economic Research (NIER)
- Malaysia: Institute of Strategic and International Studies (ISIS)
- Myanmar: Yangon University of Economics (YUE)
- New Zealand: New Zealand Institute of Economic Research (NZIER)
- Philippine: Philippine Institute for Development Studies (PIDS)
- Singapore: Singapore Institute of International Affairs (SIIA)
- Thailand: Thailand Development Research Institute (TDRI)
- Vietnam: Central Institute for Economic Management (CIEM)

=== Academic advisory members ===
Academic Advisory Council is composed of a number of internationally renowned East Asia Summit countries’ scholars and experts from universities, research institutions, the private sector, international organizations and non-governmental organizations.

The council provides advice and support to the Office of the Executive Director on;

1. Advises on the annual work program plan
2. Review and evaluation of the research outcome,
3. Review and evaluation of the performance of researchers.
- Prof Dr Peter Drysdale (Emeritus Professor Crawford School of Public Policy, Australian National University)
- Mr Pravin Kumar Agarwal (Director of The Energy and Resource Institute, India)
- Prof Kyoji Fukao (President of The Institute of Developing Economies (IDE) JETRO, Japan)
- Dr Shankaran Nambiar (Senior Research Fellow and Head, Policy Studies Division, Malaysian Institute of Economic Research, Malaysia)
- Dr Hank Lim Giok-Hay (Chairman) (Senior Research Fellow of SIIA, Singapore)
- Prof Gary Richard Hawke (Emeritus Professor, Victoria University of Wellington, and Senior Fellow, NZ Institute of Economic Research, New Zealand)
- Prof Zhang Yuyan (Director, Professor, Institute of World Economics & Politics, Chinese Academy of Social Sciences (CASS), China)

=== ERIA Outreach ===
The Public relations Division of ERIA is responsible for disseminating and sharing the findings of ERIA’s research through publications, capacity building activities, and the holding of public symposia and seminar.

==== Publications ====
The Economic Research Institute for ASEAN and East Asia (ERIA) produces books, research reports, discussion papers, and policy briefs to share and disseminate its research findings and policy recommendations to stakeholders and interested public.
These publications cover a wide range of subject matter on deepening economic integration, narrowing development gaps, and sustainable development – the three pillars under which ERIA conducts research. ERIA is also highly involved in energy-related research.
ERIA also co-publishes with international academic and professional printing houses.
Publications can be found at http://www.eria.org/publications/index.html

==== Capacity Building ====
The Capacity Building Programme links ERIA’s research, researchers and wider networks to government officials in Cambodia, Lao PDR, Myanmar and Viet Nam. Acting as a bridge between ERIA materials and emerging ideas, or through the provision of technical assistance to support analysis and policy modelling, the programme supports the development of better policy and policy regulations.

Since the inception of the Capacity Building Programme, nearly 50 activities have taken place, with around 150 government officials benefitting through the programme since 2015. In addition to responding to special requests from the participating countries, regular activities take place around five components.

==== Seminar and Symposia ====
Seminars and Symposia will be held with the aim of nurturing a sense of community in the region, seeking inputs from stakeholders, as well as promoting ERIA and disseminating ERIA related research findings. Various joint seminars and symposia will be held together with leading research institutes in and out of the East Asian region, including those in United States and Europe.

=== Providing Policy Recommendations ===
One of the most important ERIA's works is providing policy recommendations to leaders, ministers in ASEAN and EAS through East Asia Summit and ASEAN Summit, and another related meetings. As ERIA's mission expands by receiving instructions and task-outs from Summits and Ministerial Meetings, ERIA's role as the "Center of Excellence" in ASEAN and East Asia becomes increasingly important.

- At the 5th East Asia Summit and the 17th ASEAN Summit held in October 2010 in Vietnam
  Heads of government of ASEAN Member States commended ERIA's contribution in "Comprehensive Asia Development Plan (CADP)" and "Master Plan on ASEAN Connectivity"
- At the 16th ASEAN Transport Ministers Meeting held in November 2010 in Brunei Darussalam
  The Ministers expressed their high appreciation to the ERIA for its valuable support in conducting the Final Report on the ASEAN Strategic Transport Plan (ASTP) 2011–2015.

== Comprehensive Economic Partnership in East-Asia ==
The ERIA is tasked with reviewing the proposed Comprehensive Economic Partnership for East Asia or CEPEA, the Japanese proposed trade bloc involving the 16 nations of the East Asia Summit. It was decided at the Third East Asia Summit that the ERIA report on the Comprehensive Economic Partnership in East-Asia would be received at the Fourth East Asia Summit. The Fourth EAS was delayed for almost a year by reason of difficulties in the host nation Thailand.

With the subsequent change of government in Japan, and the discussion by the new administration of the East Asia Community the future of CEPEA is not yet clear.

Subsequently, the Fourth East Asia Summit supported further development on trading groupings based around the 13 country ASEAN Plus Three and the 16 country East Asia Summit.

At the subsequent APEC conference Australia announced a million Australian dollars in funding to ERIA to support research into the 16 country bloc.

== Major works ==
ERIA's works are divided into 3 fields, doing research works, disseminating its works, and providing policy recommendations.

=== Research works ===
ERIA's Research Works aims to pursue three pillars of research issues, "Deepening Economic Integration", "Narrowing Development Gaps", and "Sustainable Development". Specific research items in FY2010 are listed below.(Latest Publications)

==== Deepening economic integration ====
ERIA will conduct policy studies to promote deepening economic integration through the liberalization and facilitation of trade and investments as well as the improvement of business environment in collaboration with business community in the region, paying special attention to the improvement of cross border business transactions and behind-the-border issues including investment environment and various non-tariff measures. The following are the research projects reflecting the regional needs of ASEAN and East Asia;
- Extend and elaborate more the analysis on linkages between real and financial economies, providing rigorous analysis pursuing financial market integration through market and institutional reform strategies.
- Provide assessment on the current fiscal position, the impact of the stimulus package provided to cope with the last financial crisis, and potential fiscal risk as consequences of stimulus issuance both in medium and long term.
- Continue to support ASEAN Economic Ministers Meeting by further developing AEC/ERIA scorecards in cooperation with the ASEAN High Level Task Force and ASEAN Secretariat through rigorous analysis based on objective data collection and the application of quantitative methodologies.
- Conduct the analysis of safety and environment standardization and conformity assessment in East Asian countries and propose a desirable system, focusing on accessible design and green technology.

==== Narrowing Development Gaps ====
ERIA will continue to pursue deepening economic integration and narrowing development gaps at the same time, by applying a comprehensive approach to cover regional connectivity, maximize regional growth, and expand regional domestic demand. The following research projects are planned;
- Provide intellectual support for drafting ASEAN Connectivity Master Plan, which enables ASEAN to come up with coordinated direction to promote sectoral efforts to achieve ASEAN Community Building by the year 2015, focusing on connectivity aspects of various economic and social activities.
- Further develop and deepen the analysis on various regional industrial corridor projects including Mekong-India Industrial Corridor project and Indonesia Economic Development Corridor project, Brunei Darussalam-Indonesia-Malaysia-Philippines East ASEAN Growth Area (BIMP-EAGA) and Indonesia-Malaysia-Thailand Growth Triangle (IMT-GT), in cooperation with ASEAN Secretariat, Asian Development Bank, and related institutions and countries. This project will include the expansion and sophistication of the geographical simulation analysis focusing on the effect of logistics improvements, and also include the promotion of infrastructure projects on PPP basis related to various industrial corridors.
- Conduct studies to stimulate innovation in the region utilizing varying potentialities in East Asia, which provides resources for raising the level of economic activities in this region.
- Target the expansion of middle class in East Asia, further develop research works toward developing safety nets such as social insurance and enhancing the education system in East Asia building upon the stocktaking works of FY 2009, and deepen the analysis in fields like economic and social implications of prolonged low-fertility rate and rapid aging, reforming civil service pensions, issues of unorganized labor and strengthening rural social protection systems.
- Deepen a study on the development of small and medium-sized enterprises. This project will intend to improve economic efficiency in East Asia through the productivity enhancement and networking of SMEs, including the measures for outsourcing or sharing of common administrative and research operations.

==== Sustainable Economic Development ====
The ERIA will support interdisciplinary efforts for environment and energy issues for sustainable development in the region through comprehensive analyses and policy reviews. The projects will include the following;
- In view of the commitment made by participating countries of the World Summit on Sustainable Development to minimize adverse effects of chemical production and use by 2020, to analyze economic and social impacts of different approaches for the chemical management, surveying current chemical management system and industrial structure in each East Asian country, and studying economic and social impacts.
- Continue research on 3R (reduce, reuse, and recycling) policies focusing on the importance of recycling statistics, to identify different indicators and definitions of recycling rates and to propose strategies on how to develop a statistical system to evaluate policy impact, which will provide the basis for coordination among stakeholders, industrial standards for recycled goods, and eco-industrial parks. In October 2019, ERIA established Regional Knowledge Centre for Marine Plastic Debris (RKC-MPD) as an information platform to share the knowledge of marine plastic debris in ASEAN plus 3 member countries.
- Deepen research on energy efficiency, biomass, and bio-fuels for energy security in East Asia. This project will be a continuation of past three years’ project and intend to conduct comprehensive surveys and propose agreeable policy framework for international cooperation.
- Building upon the result of the evaluation of the impact of energy market integration in East Asian region, conduct research works on the issues of energy market integration including energy security, reform of energy pricing regime, liberalization of domestic energy market system, and investment and trans border trade of energy.

== See also ==
- Comprehensive Economic Partnership for East Asia
- Institute of Developing Economies
- Masahisa Fujita
