= East Asian Community =

Proposed trading bloc

The East Asian Community (EAC) is a proposed trade bloc for the East and Southeast Asian (ESEA) countries that may arise out of either ASEAN Plus Three or the East Asia Summit (EAS).

== History ==
=== Prior to the EAS ===
The Association of Southeast Asian Nations (ASEAN) was formed on 8 August 1967 by the Philippines, Malaysia, Thailand, Indonesia, and Singapore, as a display of solidarity against communist expansion in Vietnam and insurgency within their own borders.

In 1990, Malaysia proposed a creation of an East Asia Economic Caucus composed of the then five members of ASEAN; Brunei, Indonesia, Malaysia, the Philippines, and Thailand.

After a series of failures, ASEAN and its neighbors created another regional grouping the ASEAN Plus Three, established in 1997 and institutionalised in 1999. The significance of this grouping was demonstrated in the response to the 1997 Asian financial crisis. ASEAN Plus Three appeared to take the role of community building in East Asia.

In 1999, a Joint Statement on East Asia Cooperation was issued on the topic of East Asian integration by ASEAN.

In 1998, ASEAN Plus Three established The East Asian Vision Group of eminent persons which reported in 2001. In turn in 2001 the East Asian Study Group was established. In 2002, ASEAN Plus Three received the Final Report of the East Asian Study Group. This included a recommendation to establish an East Asia Summit.

As a result, the status of ASEAN Plus Three is unclear with the existence of the more recent East Asia Summit established in 2005 following this process and involving all the members of ASEAN Plus Three, together with India, Australia and New Zealand, otherwise known as ASEAN Plus Six.

=== Subsequent to the EAS ===
After the EAS was established the issue arose of whether any future East Asia Community would arise from the EAS or ASEAN Plus Three. Malaysia felt that it was still the case that the role of the community building fell to ASEAN Plus Three shortly before the second EAS despite "confusion". China apparently agreed whereas Japan and India felt the EAS should be the focus of the East Asian Community.

After the first EAS the feasibility of EAS to have a community building role was questioned with Ong Keng Yong, the secretary-general of ASEAN being quoted as describing the EAS as little more than a "brainstorming forum" Nevertheless, the Chairman’s Press Statement for the Seventh ASEAN Plus Three Foreign Ministers’ Meeting Kuala Lumpur, 26 July 2006 said

25. The Ministers welcomed the convening of the East Asia Summit as a forum for dialogue on broad strategic, political and economic issues of common interest with the aim of promoting peace, stability and economic prosperity in East Asia. In this respect, they recognized that the East Asia Summit could make a significant contribution to the achievement of the long-term goal of establishing an East Asian community.

It appeared that over time following the first EAS the focus was less on whether the EAS has a role in community building than on what the role was and whether it was secondary to ASEAN Plus Three. By mid-2006 the Chinese news site Xinhua Net suggested the community would arise through a two-phase process with ASEAN Plus Three as the first phase and the EAS as the second phase. The China-India joint declaration of 21 November 2006 linked, at paragraph 43, the EAS with the East Asian Community process.

The concentric circle model of the community process with ASEAN at the centre, ASEAN Plus Three at the next band and the East Asia Summit at the outer band is supported by the Second Joint Statement on East Asia Cooperation Building on the Foundations of ASEAN Plus Three Cooperation which said:

III. Looking Forward to a Decade of Consolidation and Closer Integration (2007-2017)
A. Defining the Objectives and Roles of the ASEAN Plus Three Cooperation in the Emerging Regional Architecture
1. We reaffirmed that the ASEAN Plus Three Process would remain as the main vehicle towards the long-term goal of building an East Asian community, with ASEAN as the driving force.
...
3. We recognised and supported the mutually reinforcing and complementary roles of the ASEAN Plus Three process and such regional fora as EAS, ARF, APEC and ASEM to promote East Asian community building.
4. We reiterated that East Asian integration is an open, transparent, inclusive, and forward-looking process for mutual benefits and support internationally shared values to achieve peace, stability, democracy and prosperity in the region. Guided by the vision for durable peace and shared prosperity in East Asia and beyond, we will stand guided by new economic flows, evolving strategic interactions and the belief to continue to engage all interested countries and organisations towards the realisation of an open regional architecture capable of adapting to changes and new dynamism.

The Chairman's Statement of the 3rd East Asia Summit Singapore, 21 November 2007 also states:

21. We stressed our conviction that the EAS should continue to help build a united and prosperous East Asia, with ASEAN as the driving force working in close partnership with other participants of the East Asia Summit. We reaffirmed that the East Asia Summit is an important component of the emerging regional architecture and would help build an East Asian community. It should play a complementary and mutually reinforcing role with other regional mechanisms, including the ASEAN dialogue process, the ASEAN Plus Three process, the ARF, and APEC in community building efforts.

A first stage of a future community may be seen in the Comprehensive Economic Partnership for East Asia (CEPEA) proposed by Japan for the members of the East Asia Summit. The reality appears, however, that movement towards such a relationship is a long way off. Lee Kuan Yew has compared the relationship between South-East Asia and India with that of the European Community and Turkey, and has suggested that a free-trade area involving South-East Asia and India is 30 to 50 years away.

== Japanese proposals in 2009 ==
The concept of the community, if not the details, was promoted during the 2009 Japanese general election campaign. After the change of government in Japan the details of what Japan was proposing was unclear.

The Japanese Foreign Minister Katsuya Okada in early October 2009 indicated that what was proposed was a Community based on the members of the East Asia Summit focusing on political links with a common currency "very far off in the future". The Japanese proposal is for a regional trade grouping. This proposal was based on the 16 member countries of the East Asia Summit.

The subsequent ASEAN Plus Three and East Asia Summit meetings did not clarify what role or shape the community would have.

The Chairman's Statement for the ASEAN Plus Three meeting stated:

20. We reaffirmed our commitment to the ASEAN Plus Three process as a main vehicle towards the long-term goal of building an East Asian community with ASEAN as the driving force. We noted Japan’s aspiration to reinvigorate the discussion towards building an East Asian community based on the principle of openness, transparency and inclusiveness and functional cooperation.

ASEAN Plus Three was noted as "a" main vehicle whereas earlier language had been "the".

The Chairman's Statement Fourth East Asia Summit stated:

21. We acknowledged the importance of regional discussions to examine ways to advance the stability and prosperity of the Asia Pacific region. In this connection, we noted with appreciation the following:
(a) the Philippines’s proposal to invite the heads of other regional fora and organizations in Asia-Pacific to future EAS meetings to discuss measures that will protect the region from future economic and financial crisis and strengthen Asia economic cooperation, including through the possible establishment of an economic community of Asia.
(b) Japan’s new proposal to reinvigorate the discussion towards building, in the long run, an East Asian community based on the principle of openness, transparency and inclusiveness and functional cooperation.
(c) Australia’s proposal on the Asia Pacific community in which ASEAN will be at its core, will be further discussed at a 1.5 track conference to be organized by Australia in December 2009.

In addition to these proposals India also has its proposal for an Asian Economic Community.

=== 2010 ===
The Chairman's Statement of the 16th ASEAN Summit (9 April 2010) stated:

ASEAN’s External Relations

40. We expressed our overall satisfaction with the progress in ASEAN’s cooperation with external partners within the frameworks of ASEAN+1, ASEAN+3 and East Asia Summit processes. We appreciated the valuable support and financial assistance accorded to ASEAN by its external partners.
41. We reaffirmed the importance of ASEAN’s cooperation with external partners in maintaining peace and stability in the region, enhancing ASEAN’s internal regional integration, narrowing the development gap, enhancing intra-ASEAN connectivity and expanding ASEAN’s connectivity to the wider region.
42. Emphasizing the need to successfully conclude action plans/work programmes, cooperation agreements in trade, economic and socio-cultural fields with ASEAN’s dialogue partners, we tasked our sectoral Ministers to work closely with their external partners towards that aim.

43. We recognized and supported the mutually reinforcing roles of the ASEAN+3 process, the East Asia Summit (EAS), and such regional forums as the ASEAN Regional Forum (ARF), to promote the East Asian cooperation and dialogue towards the building of a community in East Asia. In this connection, we encouraged Russia and the US to deepen their engagement in an evolving regional architecture, including the possibility of their involvement with the EAS through appropriate modalities, taking into account the Leaders-led, open and inclusive nature of the EAS.

By mid-2010 the leaders of the three nations referred to in the October 2009 statement had all changed: Japan and Australia had changed Prime Ministers due to internal political issues and the Philippines had gone through a Presidential election for which the incumbent was ineligible. ASEAN nevertheless continued to discuss the issues of regional structures.

== The nature of the East Asia Community ==
The shape of the East Asia Community remains something to be defined in the future. The issues being explored at this stage deal with whether there will be a Community which must be resolved prior to understanding what it will look like.

Some have linked the EAS with a future broader Asian Economic Community like the European Community. However, some commentators see this an overly optimistic vision and it is plainly in the very distant future if it is to occur - the European Community has taken decades to reach its current shape, had greater early drive for its creation and more coherence between its members (ASEAN alone is composed of democracies, dictatorships, capitalist tax havens and communist states).

On any view community building is not a short-term project. However, after the second EAS the Indian Prime Minister Dr. Manmohan Singh was confident that the EAS would lead to an East Asia Community. China had also apparently accepted this was the case.

If achieved, the Comprehensive Economic Partnership for East Asia (CEPEA) would be a first but important step in the community building process. The Second EAS and Third EAS seem to have increased confidence in CEPEA but is still only a proposal.

For the moment currency union, as distinct from the Asian Development Bank proposed Asian Currency Unit, is not even being pursued within ASEAN, much less the broader members of the EAS.

=== Economic aspects ===
The idea of a pan-Asian trading bloc has been proposed given the potential for the economic benefits that may be produced from such structures in light of the success of European Community (now the European Union), and ASEAN Free Trade Area.

It is economics perhaps more than anything else which is driving the discussion. The Indian External Affairs Minister Shri Pranab Mukherjee was quoted as saying in February 2007:

Speaking at the Summit, Prime Minister Dr. Manmohan Singh said that the long-term goal of the EAS should be the creation of a harmonious and prosperous community of nations that would pool its resources to tackle common challenges. He also observed that a virtual Asian Economic Community was emerging with the Free Trade Agreements (FTAs) amongst countries of the region. However, there is a need for a wider perspective so that ongoing processes could become building blocks for a larger vision. It was in this context that we have suggested a Pan-Asian Free Trade Arrangement that could be the starting point for an Economic Community. Such a community would be the third pole of the world economy after the European Union and the North American Free Trade Area (NAFTA).

A view also supported by the Indian Defence Minister Shri A.K. Antony the next day:

In the regional context, the contours of an Asian economic integration are beginning to take shape. The East Asia Summit (EAS) has gathered a self-sustaining momentum towards the creation of an East Asian Community in the coming years. It may even lead to a larger Asian solidarity, as envisioned by Pandit Nehru in the early 1950s. We perceive the comprehensive interaction with South-East Asia as a vehicle for regional growth. It will eventually lead to prosperity and true peace in the entire region.

However, economic progress and social development will need a conducive environment for growth, particularly in terms of regional stability and security. The end of the Cold War did provide the necessary systemic conditions, but it was at best only a transitional phase. Over the last few years, the region as a whole has witnessed a steady realignment of geo-strategic equations.

Hence it can be seen that fear of large international trading blocs is driving this discussion.

The Third EAS approved the establishment of the Economic Research Institute for ASEAN and East Asia to further investigate economic integration between the EAS members.

=== Cultural perspectives ===
At the 14th Japanese Studies Association of Australia conference held at the University of Adelaide in July 2005, the topic was ‘Japan’s Vision of an East Asian Community: Responses from Asia,’ where different regional perspectives concerning the East Asian Community were given.

Japan: competition between Japan and China over leadership roles help to foster the formation of an East Asian Community by encouraging ASEAN and South Korea to become more unified.

China: The contrast between Japan and China is each respective nation's idea of membership inclusion: Japan favors a broader concept that favors India, Australia, and New Zealand, while China's preference is to construct an East Asian Community with exclusively East and Southeast Asian members. China's criticisms of Japan is that Japan prefers “institutionalism,” (what China regards as heavily influenced by the U.S.), while China prefers Asian-styled gradualism.

India: Since India is not in East Asia, its membership in the East Asian Community will pull the EAC back into ‘Asia’ and away from the ‘Pacific orientation’ that dominated economic communities like APEC.

Australia: Australia's economic and geo-strategic security are linked with the East Asian region, therefore it is eager to join the East Asian Community. However, at the East Asian Summit in Kuala Lumpur in December 2005, Australia emphasized the need to include the U.S. in the East Asian Community for security reasons.

Similarly, in Kitti Prasirtsuk's article, “Japan’s Vision of an East Asian Community: A Perspective from Thailand,” the author gives three reasons for Thailand's support for Japanese efforts for building an East Asian Community. These include the Japan-ASEAN comprehensive Economic Partnership (JACEP), capacity building, and financial cooperation. Thailand's support for an Economic Partnership Agreement (EPA) with Japan is due to perceived economic and political gains through having many Free Trade Areas (FTA). By becoming a development partner with Japan, Thailand can benefit from the foreign aid known as the Official Development Assistance (ODA). In financial cooperation with Japan, Thailand proposed the Asia Cooperation Dialogue (ACD), in order to prevent another financial crisis. Ultimately, Thailand's support for either Japan or China (in their vision of an East Asian Community) rests on the perceived benefits to its national interests.

== See also ==
- Comprehensive Economic Partnership for East Asia
- Regional Comprehensive Economic Partnership
