= Comprehensive Economic Partnership for East Asia =

Proposal for free trade agreement

The Comprehensive Economic Partnership for East Asia (CEPEA) was a Japanese led proposal for trade co-operation and free trade agreement among the 16 present member countries of the East Asia Summit. All efforts were overtaken by the Regional Comprehensive Economic Partnership.

== Countries involved ==
The 16 countries are:

- Southeast Asia: the 11 members of ASEAN
  - except for Timor-Leste
    - Indonesia
    - Malaysia
    - Philippines
    - Singapore
    - Thailand
    - Brunei
    - Vietnam
    - Laos
    - Myanmar
    - Cambodia
- East Asia: the three members of ASEAN Plus Three
  - China
  - Japan
  - South Korea
- South Asia and Oceania:
  - India
  - Australia
  - New Zealand

== Background ==
The concept has been in discussion stages since 2006 but gained momentum in 2008 and 2009 when India and ASEAN; and Australia, New Zealand and ASEAN respectively concluded free trade agreements.

The CEPEA proposal was advanced by Japan in conjunction with the establishment of the Economic Research Institute for ASEAN and East Asia (ERIA). The two mechanisms are designed to be mutually supporting liberalisation and co-operation.

The details of the concept and its relationship with other proposals for the region, such as the East Asian Community, remain unclear. An alternative proposal based on the 13 members of the ASEAN Plus Three is called the East Asia Free Trade Agreement (EAFTA).

The Third East Asia Summit agreed that a final report on the CEPEA proposal was to be received at the Fourth East Asia Summit which was held in October 2009.

The Chairman's Report for the Fourth East Asia Summit (25 October 2009) stated:

19.We noted the final Phase II Report of the Track Two Study Group on Comprehensive Economic Partnership in East Asia (CEPEA) and welcomed the decision of our Economic Ministers who met in Bangkok on 15 August 2009 to task the Senior Economic Officials to discuss and consider the recommendations in the Phase I and II reports. CEPEA and East Asia Free Trade Area (EAFTA) could be examined and considered in parallel.

The report for the ASEAN Plus Three meeting, held the day before with 13 of 16 of the same members, also stated:

13.We noted the final report of the Phase II feasibility study of the East Asia Free Trade Area (EAFTA) and welcomed the decision of 12th AEM Plus Three Consultations in Bangkok on 15 August 2009 to task the Senior Economic Officials to discuss and consider the recommendations in the Phase I and II reports. EAFTA and Comprehensive Economic Partnership in East Asia (CEPEA) could be examined and considered in parallel.

The Chairman's Statement of the 16th ASEAN Summit (9 April 2010) stated:

30. We noted the initiatives being undertaken to take forward broader regional integration by considering the recommendations of both East Asia Free Trade Agreement (EAFTA) and the Comprehensive Economic Partnership for East Asia (CEPEA) studies together. We looked forward to receiving the progress report at the 17th ASEAN Summit in October 2010 and to discussing with our Dialogue Partners the future direction of regional architecture with ASEAN at its core.

By August 2010 working groups involving the 16 nations to study Economic Cooperation, Rules of Origin, Customs Procedures and Tariff Nomenclature had been formed.

In August 2011, East Asia Summit Economic Ministers welcomed a Chinese and Japanese joint 'Initiative on Speeding up the Establishment of EAFTA and CEPEA'.

== East Asia Free Trade Agreement ==
13 of the 16 nations (excluding India, Australia and New Zealand) are also simultaneously negotiating an East Asia Free Trade Area.

The two processes are not alternatives and both are being pursued simultaneously

== Current arrangements ==
The 16 members are presently involved in a series of separate arrangements among the members of the grouping. The 10 members ASEAN have established the ASEAN Free Trade Area. Australia and New Zealand have the long established Closer Economic Relations.

Between the 16 members bilateral and multilateral arrangements are in place or under negotiation.

ASEAN has the following arrangements in place:

- the ASEAN–China Free Trade Area came into force on 1 January 2010;
- a comprehensive economic partnership agreement with Japan came into force on 1 December 2008;
- the ASEAN Korea Free Trade Agreement, the trade in goods provisions came into effect on 1 June 2007, an agreement for trade in services was signed in 2007 and the trade in investments provisions were signed in 2009;
- a free trade agreement with Australian and New Zealand (jointly) AANZFTA that came into force on 1 January 2010;
- the ASEAN-India Trade in Goods (TIG) Agreement came into effect on 1 January 2010. India has formally signed the Trade in Services & Trade in Investments Agreement with ASEAN. The Services Agreement will open up opportunities of movement of both manpower and investments from either side between India and ASEAN. Nine out of ten ASEAN countries have signed the same. Philippines is completing its domestic procedure and it is expected to sign soon;

China, Japan and South Korea are researching (as at October 2009) a joint arrangement between the three countries (China–Japan–South Korea Free Trade Agreement) with talks hoped to commence in 2012;

China has the following additional arrangements in place:

- China–South Korea Free Trade Agreement - came into force 20 December 2015;
- China–Australia Free Trade Agreement - came into force 20 December 2015;
- the New Zealand – China Free Trade Agreement came into force 1 October 2008;
- a feasibility study on an arrangement with India was positively concluded in 2007;

plus

Japan has the following additional arrangements in place:

  - negotiations with South Korea on an arrangement but which have been suspended since 2004;
  - Japan–Australia Economic Partnership Agreement - negotiations with Australia on an arrangement;
  - negotiations with India on an arrangement;
  - conducting a feasibility study with New Zealand as of (14 May 2008)

plus

South Korea has the following additional arrangements in place:

  - Australia–Korea Free Trade Agreement - negotiations with Australia on an arrangement;
  - negotiations with New Zealand on an arrangement;
  - India and South Korea signed a comprehensive economic partnership agreement in August 2009;

plus

Australia has the following additional arrangements in place:

  - as noted above Closer Economic Relations with New Zealand;
  - a feasibility study with India about entry into an arrangement;

plus

India has the following additional arrangements in place:

  - a feasibility study with New Zealand about entry into an arrangement;

plus

multiple additional bilateral arrangements between one or more ASEAN members separately.

In addition individual members of ASEAN may also have other arrangements in place beyond the arrangements negotiated by ASEAN as a bloc i.e., Singapore by itself outside of ASEAN has a series of FTAs.

== See also ==
- East Asian Community
- East Asia Summit
- Rules of Origin
- Market access
- Free-trade area
- Tariffs
