= Institute of Developing Economies =

Japanese research institute

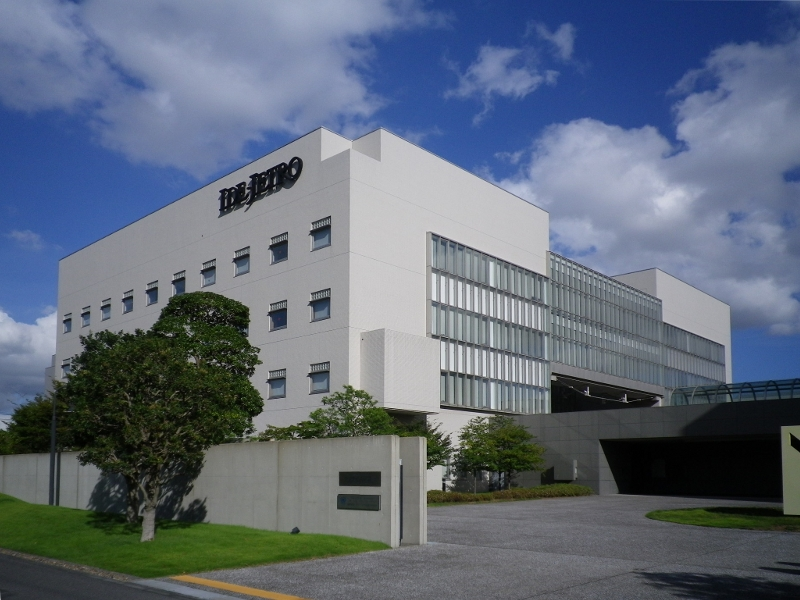
Institute of Developing Economies, September 17, 2011

Institute of Developing Economies (IDE; アジア経済研究所) is a semi-governmental research institute under the Ministry of Economy, Trade and Industry, and the largest institute on social science in Japan. Current status is a body of the Japan External Trade Organization. It is located in Kaihin-Makuhari area of Mihama Ward, Chiba City. The President of IDE is Takashi Shiraishi (白石隆), who is the vice president of the National Graduate Institute for Policy Studies.

IDE's major research field is development economics and area studies. IDE is also de facto mother body of ERIA. Before ERIA acquire status of legal personality, IDE provides the management of budget, research projects, and human resources.

== Presidents ==
Only after merged with JETRO

- Ippei Yamazawa (山澤逸平): 1998–2003
- Masahisa Fujita (藤田昌久): 2003–2007
- Takashi Shiraishi (白石隆): 2007–present

== See also ==
- JETRO
- Economic Research Institute for ASEAN and East Asia
- Think Tank
