= India–South Korea Comprehensive Economic Partnership Agreement =

Free trade agreement between India and South Korea

India–South Korea Comprehensive Economic Partnership Agreement: 대한민국-인도 포괄적 경제동반자 협정 (Korean)
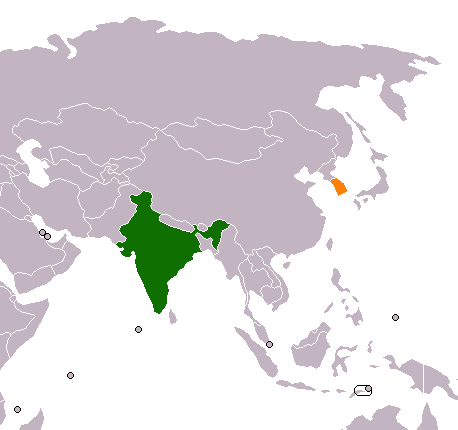
- Languages: English; Korean
- Type: Free trade agreement
- Member states: India; South Korea
- Establishment: January 1, 2010; 16 years ago

Area
  - Total: 3,386,983 km^{2} (1,307,721 sq mi)

Population
  - 2019 estimate: 1,401,511,167
  - Density: 413.8/km^{2} (1,071.7/sq mi)
- Website www.fta.go.kr/main/situation/kfta/lov5/in/ www.indembassyseoul.gov.in/page/cepa/

The India–South Korea Comprehensive Economic Partnership Agreement, also referred to as the India–South Korea Free Trade Agreement, is a free trade agreement between India and South Korea. The agreement was signed on August 7, 2009. The signing ceremony took place in Seoul and the agreement was signed by the Indian Commerce Minister, Anand Sharma and South Korean Commerce Minister, Kim Jong-Hoon. The negotiations took three-and-a-half years, with the first session being held in February 2006. The agreement was passed in the South Korean parliament on 6 November 2009. It was passed in the Indian parliament the next week. Once passed, the agreement came into effect sixty days later, on January 1, 2010. It is equivalent to a free trade agreement. The agreement will provide better access for the Indian service industry in South Korea. Services include Information technology, engineering, finance, and the legal field. South Korean car manufactures will see large tariffs cuts to below 1%. All the while, Korean corporations have flooded India with cheaper imports of raw metal, steel and finished products.

The agreement will ease restrictions on foreign direct investments. Companies can own up to 65% of a company in the other country. Both countries avoided issues over agriculture, fisheries, and mining and choose not to decrease tariffs in those areas. This was due to the very sensitive nature of these sectors in the respective countries. Trade between India and South Korea was $15.6 billion in 2008. This is a major increase from 2002, when the total trade amount was $2.6 billion. The Korea Institute for International Economic Policy believes the agreement will increase trade between the two countries by $3.3 billion.

== Negotiation and Establishment (2005 – 2009) ==
In January 2005, both parties formed a Joint Study Group to assess the viability of a free trade agreement between the two nations. During the following four years, the Joint Study Group studied the existing $7.1 billion trade between the two nations and negotiated a deal that paid respect to economic weaknesses and strengths of the markets in both nations. Rahul Khullar, the Indian Commerce Secretary and member of the Joint Study Group, elaborates that one such cooperation occurred during discussions regarding the agricultural sector, one that is particularly weak in South Korea, but thriving in India.

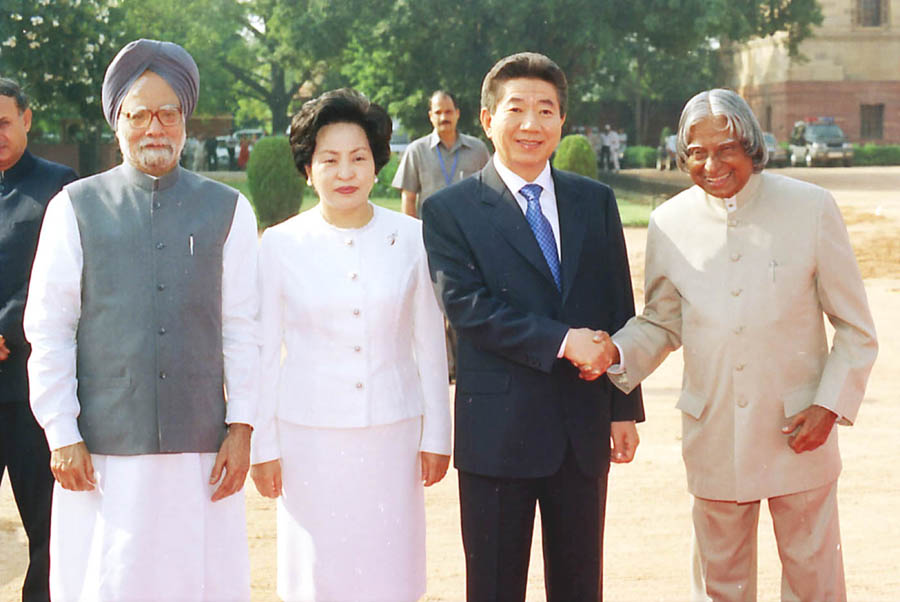
The President of Republic of Korea Mr. Roh Moo-Hyun and his Wife Mrs. Roh Moo-Hyun are received by the President Dr. A.P.J Abdul Kalam and the Prime Minister Dr. Manmohan Singh at a Ceremonial Reception in New Delhi on October 05

The deal, for South Korea, added to a large roster of existing bilateral and multilateral free trade agreements created under the term of Korean President Roh Moo-hyun. As for India, the negotiations coincided with then-incumbent Indian Prime Minister Manmohan Singh's Look East initiative, which promised greater regional integration between India and the markets of East Asia.

After 12 rounds of negotiations between January 2005 and September 25, 2008, the committee concluded discussion and went into a phase of legal review by both governments. The bill was passed by the Indian parliament on July 2, 2009 and, subsequently, by the South Korean parliament on November 6, 2009.

== Impact ==
Trade Balance between India and South Korea (2007 – 2017, in billions USD)
Year	Indian exports	South Korean exports	Trade Balance	Volume
2007	4.49	6.25	-1.76	10.74
2008	6.35	8.57	-2.22	15.92
2009	4.11	7.91	-3.8	12.02
2010	5.42	10.7	-5.28	16.12
2011	7.45	12.6	-5.15	20.05
2012	6.57	13.1	-6.53	19.67
2013	6.03	12	-5.97	18.03
2014	5.13	13	-7.87	18.13
2015	4.2	12.5	-8.3	16.7
2016	4.07	11.8	-7.73	14.87
2017	4.96	15.3	-10.34	20.26

== See also ==
- Comprehensive Economic Partnership for East Asia
