= East Asia Summit =

Annual ASEAN meeting since 2005

Map of EAS members and candidates Original Members Members from the 6th EAS Candidates

Indian Prime Minister Narendra Modi in a group photograph during the 21st East Asia Summit at Manila, in Philippines on November 17, 2026.

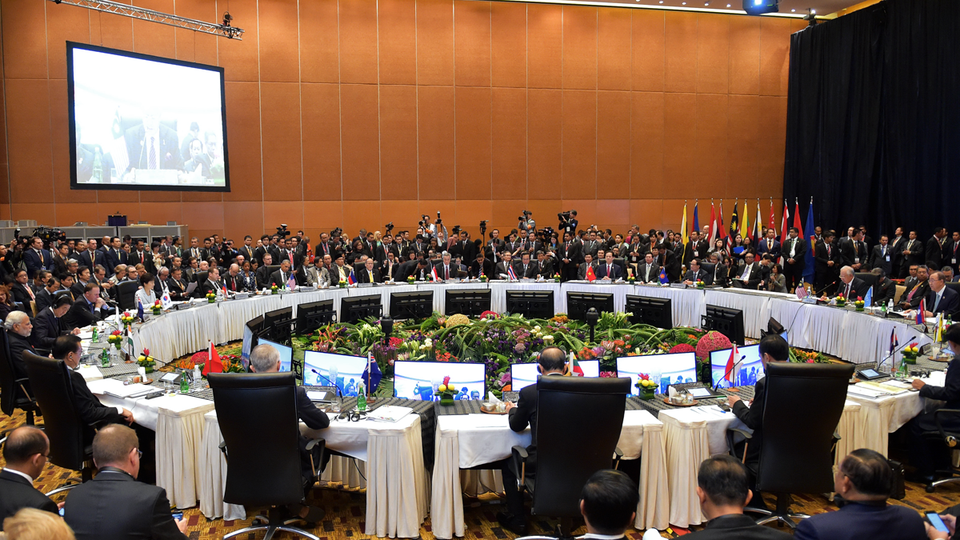
A session of the 10th East Asia Summit, 2015.

The East Asia Summit (EAS) is a regional forum held annually by leaders of, initially, 16 countries in the East Asian, Southeast Asian, South Asian and Oceanian regions, based on the ASEAN Plus Six mechanism. Membership expanded to 18 countries including Russia and the United States at the Sixth EAS in 2011. Since its establishment, ASEAN has held the central role and leadership in the forum. EAS meetings are held after the annual ASEAN leaders' meetings, and plays an important role in the regional architecture of Asia-Pacific. The first summit was held in Kuala Lumpur, Malaysia on 14 December 2005.

== History ==
=== History prior to the first East Asia Summit ===
The concept of an East Asia Grouping has significant history going back to an idea first promoted in 1991 by then Malaysian Prime Minister Mahathir Mohamad.

The final report in 2002 of the East Asian Study Group, established by the ASEAN Plus Three countries, was based on an EAS involving ASEAN Plus Three, therefore not involving Australia, New Zealand, or India. The EAS as proposed was to be an ASEAN-led development, with the summit to be linked to ASEAN summit meetings. However, the issue was to which countries beyond those in ASEAN the EAS was to be extended.

The decision to hold the EAS was reached during the 2004 ASEAN Plus Three summit and the initial 16 members determined at the ASEAN Plus Three Ministerial Meeting held in Laos at the end of July 2005.

Credit for advancing the forum during the 2004 ASEAN Plus Three summit has been attributed to Malaysia.

== Annual Summits ==
#	Date	Country	Host	Host leader	Note	Image
1st	14 December 2005	Malaysia	Kuala Lumpur	Prime Minister Abdullah Ahmad Badawi	Russian President Vladimir Putin attended the summit as guest.	
2nd	15 January 2007	Philippines	Mandaue	President Gloria Macapagal Arroyo	Rescheduled from 13 December 2006 due to Typhoon Seniang. Cebu Declaration on East Asian Energy Security	
3rd	21 November 2007	Singapore	Singapore	Prime Minister Lee Hsien Loong	Singapore Declaration on Climate Change, Energy and the Environment; Agreed to establish Economic Research Institute for ASEAN and East Asia	
4th	25 October 2009	Thailand	Cha-am & Hua Hin	Prime Minister Abhisit Vejjajiva	Thailand was initially to host the summit in 2008. It was announced in late October 2008 that the summit would be shifted from Bangkok to Chiang Mai due to concerns about political unrest in Bangkok.	
5th	30 October 2010	Vietnam	Hanoi	President Nguyễn Minh Triết	The United States Secretary of State and the Foreign Minister of Russia attended. The United States and Russia to join the summit at the Sixth EAS.	
6th	18–19 November 2011	Indonesia	Bali	President Susilo Bambang Yudhoyono	The United States and Russia joined the summit.	
7th	19–20 November 2012	Cambodia	Phnom Penh	Prime Minister Hun Sen	The ongoing tensions arising from the territorial disputes in the South China Sea and East China Sea overshadowed the effort to advance the trade and economic arrangements between members of the summit.	
8th	9–10 October 2013	Brunei	Bandar Seri Begawan	Sultan Hassanal Bolkiah		
9th	12–13 November 2014	Myanmar (Burma)	Nay Pyi Taw	President Thein Sein		
10th	21–22 November 2015	Malaysia	Kuala Lumpur	Prime Minister Najib Razak		
11th	6–8 September 2016	Laos	Vientiane	Prime Minister Thongloun Sisoulith		
12th	13–14 November 2017	Philippines	Pasay	President Rodrigo Duterte	Canadian Prime Minister Justin Trudeau attended the summit as a guest.	
13th	14–15 November 2018	Singapore	Singapore	Prime Minister Lee Hsien Loong	Russian President Vladimir Putin attended the event.	
14th	4 November 2019	Thailand	Bangkok	Prime Minister Prayut Chan-o-cha		
15th	14 November 2020	Vietnam	Hanoi (as Chair's venue)	Prime Minister Nguyễn Xuân Phúc	The summit was held online due to the COVID-19 pandemic and hosted by Vietnam, where the summit was initially scheduled to take place.	
16th	26–27 October 2021	Brunei	Bandar Seri Begawan (as Chair's venue)	Sultan Hassanal Bolkiah	The summit was held online due to the COVID-19 pandemic and hosted by Brunei, where the summit was initially scheduled to take place. Since 2021, Myanmar junta leaders have been excluded from the summit following the 2021 coup d'état.	
17th	12–13 November 2022	Cambodia	Phnom Penh	Prime Minister Hun Sen	The European Union and Shanghai Cooperation Organisation attended the summit as guests.	
18th	6–7 September 2023	Indonesia	Jakarta	President Joko Widodo		
19th	10–11 October 2024	Laos	Vientiane	Prime Minister Sonexay Siphandone		
20th	26–28 October 2025	Malaysia	Kuala Lumpur	Prime Minister Anwar Ibrahim		
21st	16–18 November 2026	Philippines	Manila	President Bongbong Marcos		

=== Early summits ===
Prior to the first meeting there was significant discussion as to which countries should be represented. At the time there were difficulties in the relationship between the "Plus Three" members (i.e. Japan, China and South Korea) of ASEAN Plus Three, and the perception that India and Australia and to a lesser extent New Zealand were present to balance the growing China power all meant the first meeting's achievements were limited. Russia expressed early interest in EAS membership and attended the first EAS as an observer at the invitation of 2005 EAS host Malaysia.

The next EAS was to be held on 13 December 2006 in Metro Cebu, Philippines. After the confidence building of the inaugural EAS the 2006 EAS will help to define the future role of the EAS, its relationship with ASEAN Plus Three and the involvement of Russia in EAS. However, in the face of Tropical Typhoon Utor the summit was postponed until January 2007. It was rescheduled for 15 January 2007, approximately a month after the original scheduled date.

=== Internal issues ===
Internal ASEAN issues were significant for the next Summits. The issues of Myanmar (Burma), following the 2007 Burmese anti-government protests, and climate change were expected to be discussed at the Third EAS. Myanmar successfully blocked formal discussion of its internal affairs.

The summit did issue the Singapore Declaration on Climate Change, Energy and the Environment.

The Summit also agreed to the establishment of the Economic Research Institute for ASEAN and East Asia and to receive the final report on the Comprehensive Economic Partnership for East Asia at the Fourth EAS.

The outcomes are summarised in the Chairman's Statement of the 3rd East Asia Summit Singapore, 21 November 2007.

The Fourth EAS was significantly delayed and its location changed a number of times due to internal tensions in Thailand, the host nation. In the lead up to the summit there were several border clashes between Thailand and Cambodia. The summit however is said to be used as an opportunity for discussions on the sidelines between the respective nation's leaders. The summit was cancelled following protesters taking over the summit's venue on the day of the summit. It was rescheduled and held on 25 October 2009. The summit adopted statements on disaster relief and the Nalanda University.

=== Growth of the Summit ===
After a period of review, the Summit grew from 16 to 18 nations by adding the United States and Russia to the Summit. Initially represented by their Foreign Ministers at the Fifth EAS, the two new members were invited to formally join with the Sixth EAS. Tensions between the members of the Summit continued to impede the members developing a more ambitious program.

== Member nations ==
Countries	Capital City	Leader Position	Head of Government	Head of State
Australia	Canberra	Prime Minister of Australia	Prime Minister Anthony Albanese	Charles III, King of Australia
Brunei	Bandar Seri Begawan	Sultan of Brunei	Hassanal Bolkiah, Sultan of Brunei	
Cambodia	Phnom Penh	Prime Minister of Cambodia	Prime Minister Hun Manet	Norodom Sihamoni, King of Cambodia
China	Beijing	Premier of China	Premier Li Qiang	Xi Jinping, CCP General Secretary and President of China (Note: The de jure head of government of China is the Premier, whose current holder is Li Qiang. The President of China is legally a ceremonial office, but the paramount leader has always held this office since 1993 except for the months of transition, and the current paramount leader is President Xi Jinping.)
India	New Delhi	Prime Minister of India	Prime Minister Narendra Modi	Droupadi Murmu, President of India
Indonesia	Jakarta	President of Indonesia	Prabowo Subianto, President of Indonesia	
Japan	Tokyo	Prime Minister of Japan	Prime Minister Sanae Takaichi	Naruhito, Emperor of Japan
Laos	Vientiane	Prime Minister of Laos	Prime Minister Saleumxay Kommasith	Thongloun Sisoulith, General Secretary and President of Laos
Malaysia	Kuala Lumpur	Prime Minister of Malaysia	Prime Minister Anwar Ibrahim	Ibrahim Iskandar of Johor, Yang di-Pertuan Agong (Monarch)
Myanmar	Naypyidaw	President of Myanmar	Min Aung Hlaing, President of Myanmar	
New Zealand	Wellington	Prime Minister of New Zealand	Prime Minister Christopher Luxon	Charles III, King of New Zealand
Philippines	Manila	President of the Philippines	Bongbong Marcos, President of the Philippines	
Russia	Moscow	Prime Minister of Russia	Prime Minister Mikhail Mishustin	Vladimir Putin, President of Russia
Singapore	Singapore	Prime Minister of Singapore	Prime Minister Lawrence Wong	Tharman Shanmugaratnam, President of Singapore
South Korea	Seoul	President of South Korea	Lee Jae Myung, President of South Korea	
Thailand	Bangkok	Prime Minister of Thailand	Prime Minister Anutin Charnvirakul	Vajiralongkorn (Rama X), King of Thailand
Timor-Leste	Dili	Prime Minister of Timor-Leste	Prime Minister Xanana Gusmão	President José Ramos-Horta
United States	Washington, D.C.	President of the United States	Donald Trump, President of the United States	
Vietnam	Hanoi	Prime Minister of Vietnam	Prime Minister Lê Minh Hưng	Tô Lâm, General Secretary of the Communist Party and President of Vietnam (Note: The actual head of the executive government of Vietnam is the Prime Minister, whose current holder is Lê Minh Hưng. The President of Vietnam is legally the head of state, but the General Secretary of the Communist Party of Vietnam (practical highest political leader in a one-party communist state) is being Tô Lâm.)

=== Current leaders of the East Asia Summit ===
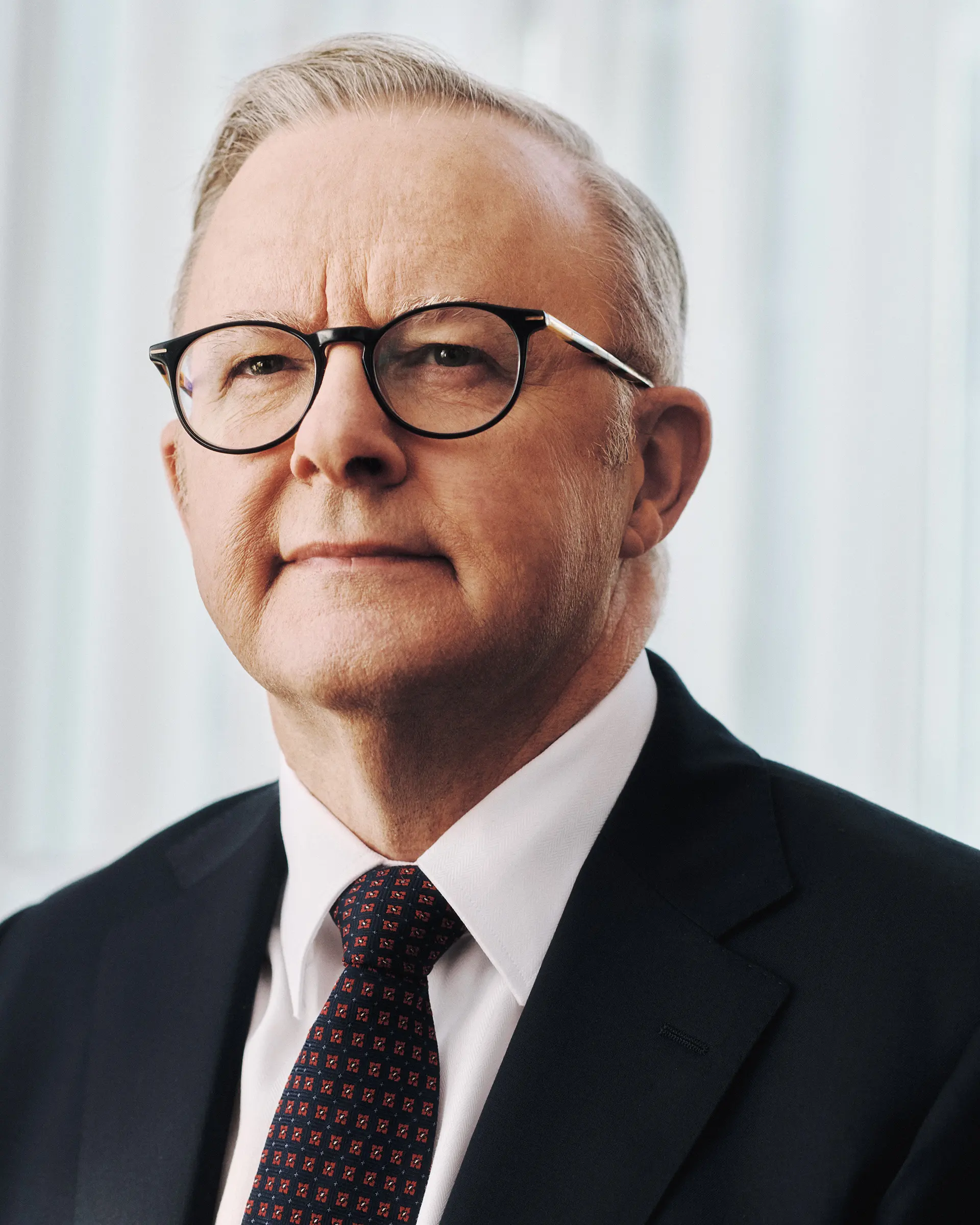
Australia
Prime Minister Anthony Albanese

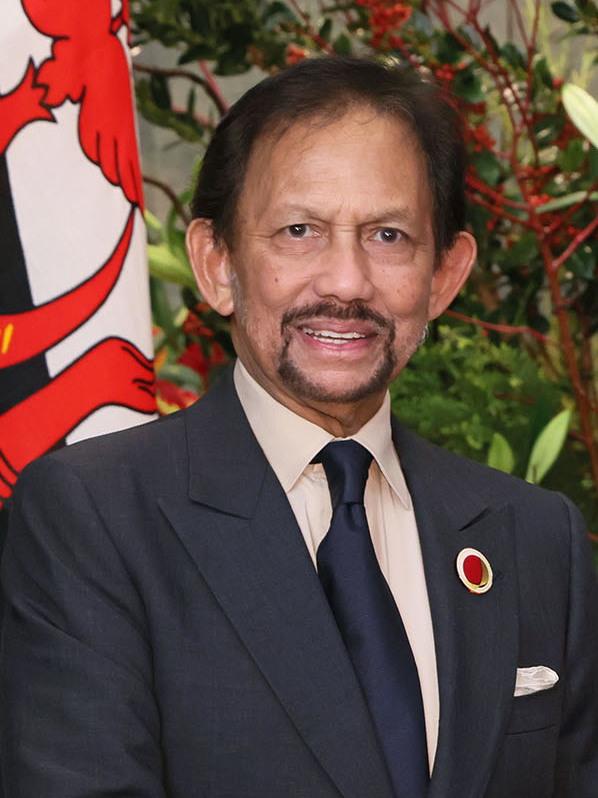
Brunei
Sultan Hassanal Bolkiah

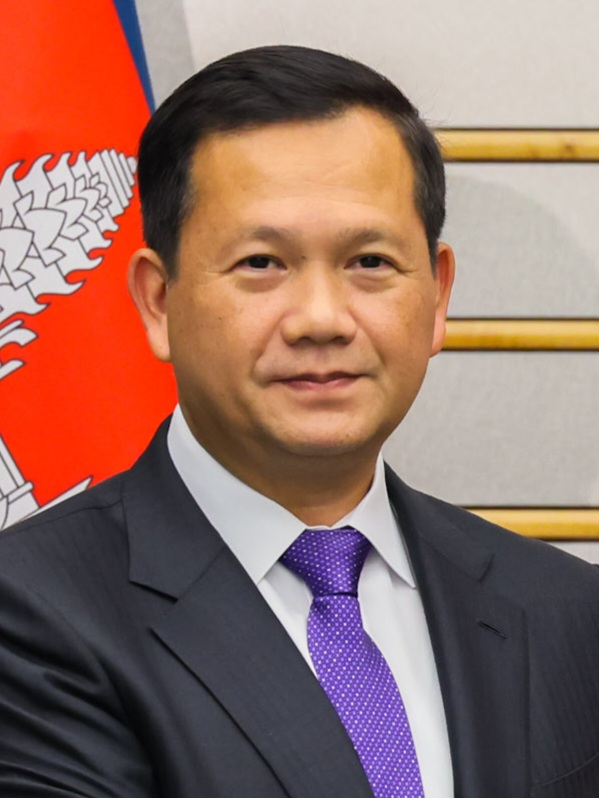
Cambodia
Prime Minister Hun Manet

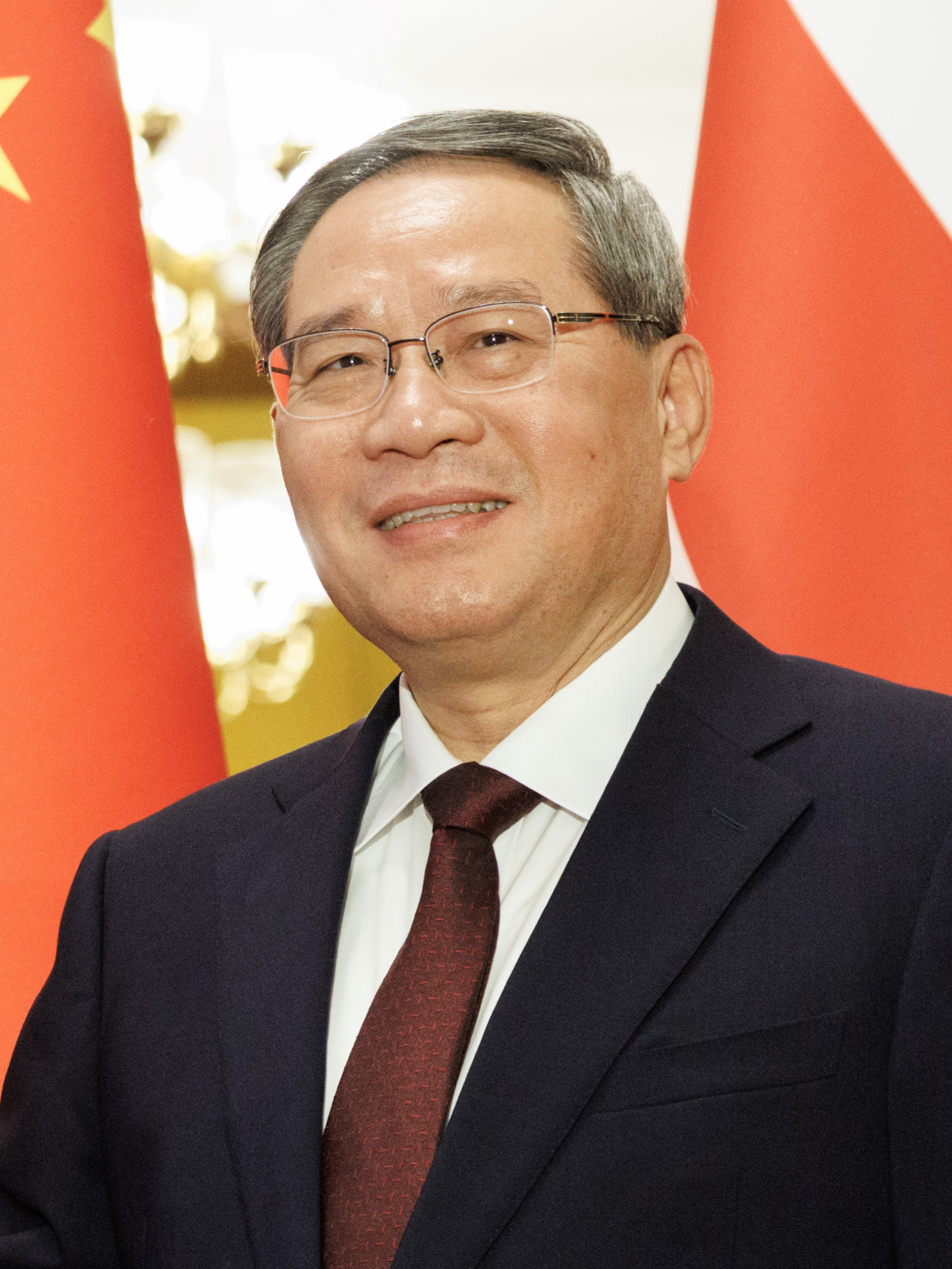
(China) China
Premier Li Qiang

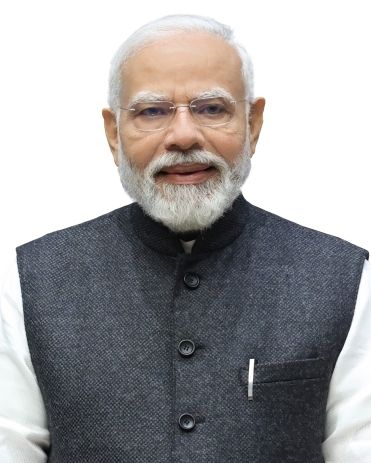
(India) India
Prime Minister Narendra Modi

(Indonesia) Indonesia
President Prabowo Subianto

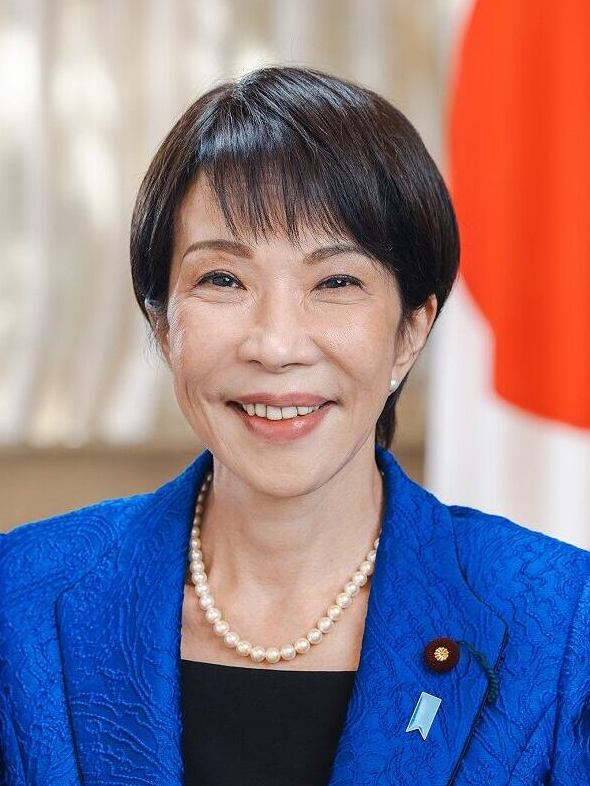
(Japan) Japan
Prime Minister Sanae Takaichi

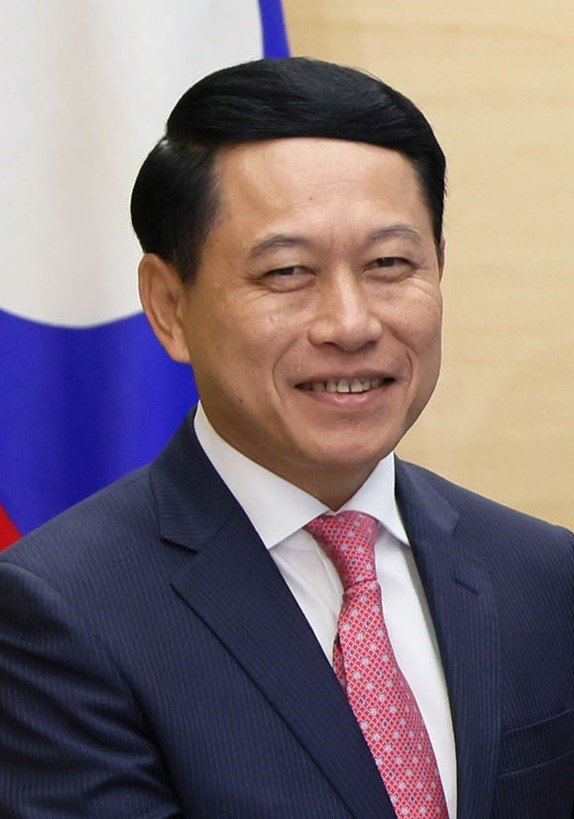
(Laos) Laos
Prime Minister Saleumxay Kommasith

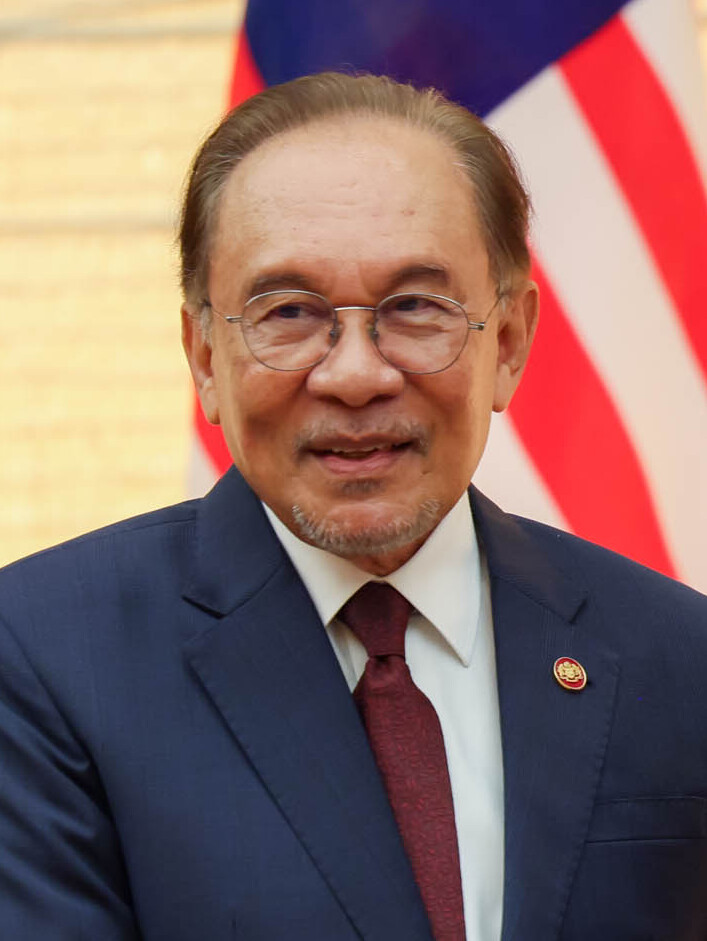
(Malaysia) Malaysia
Prime Minister Anwar Ibrahim

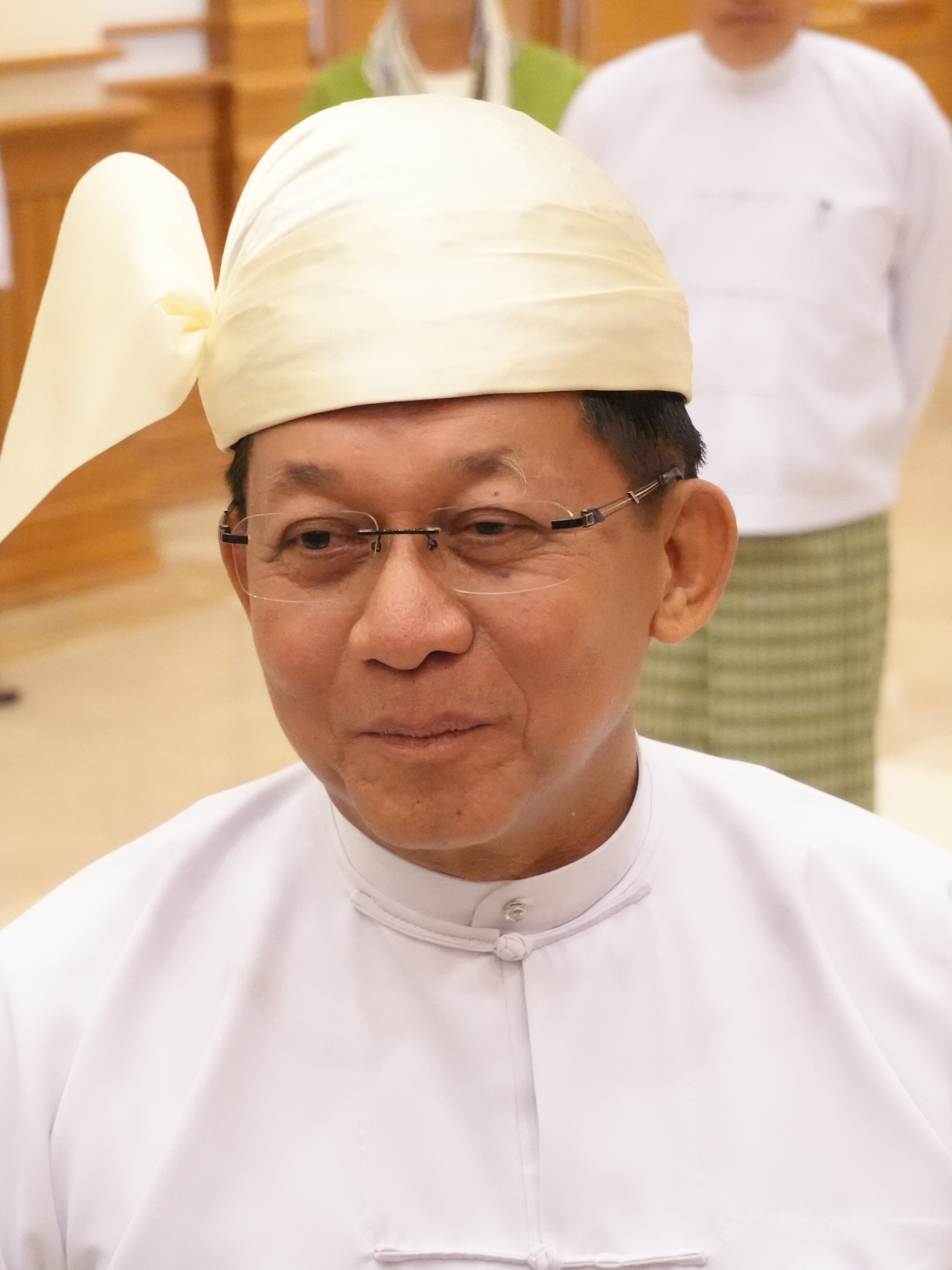
(Myanmar) Myanmar
President Min Aung Hlaing

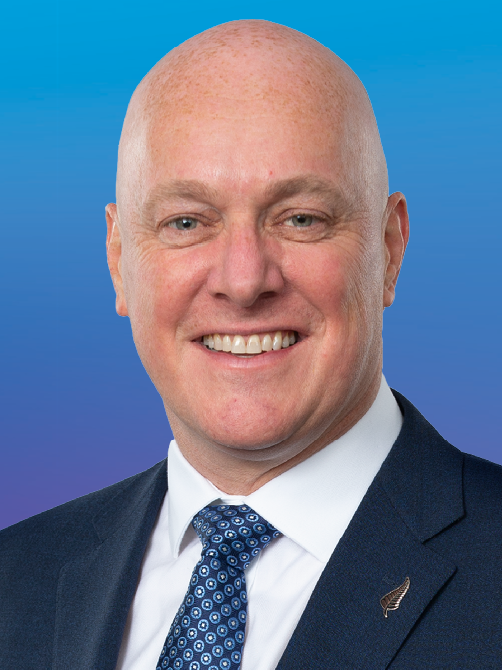
(New Zealand) New Zealand
Prime Minister Christopher Luxon

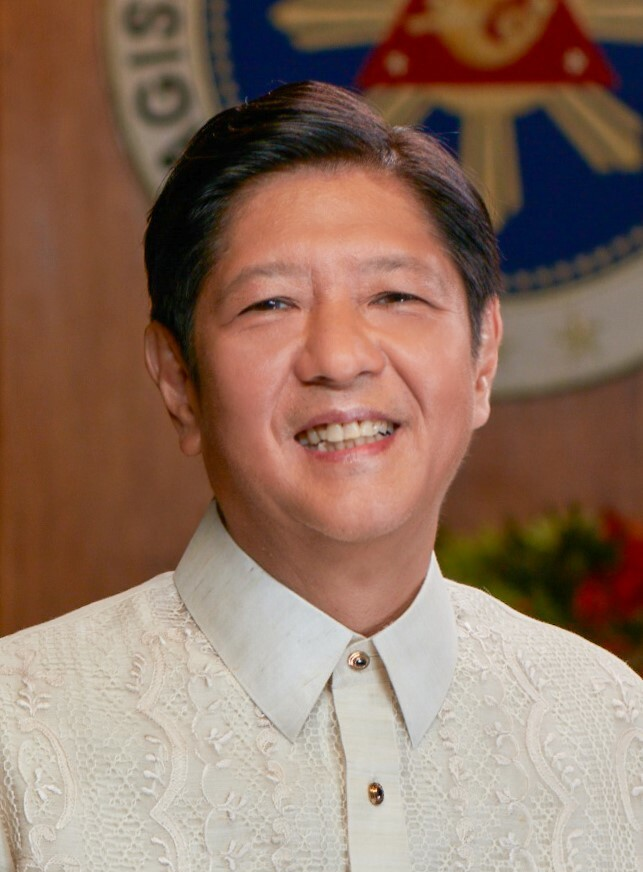
(Philippines) Philippines
President Bongbong Marcos

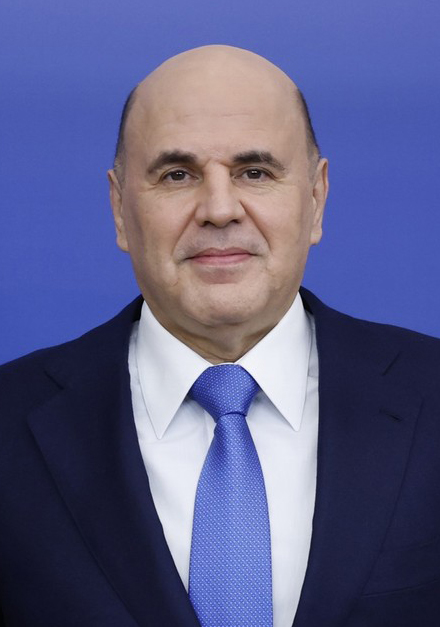
(Russia) Russia
Prime Minister Mikhail Mishustin

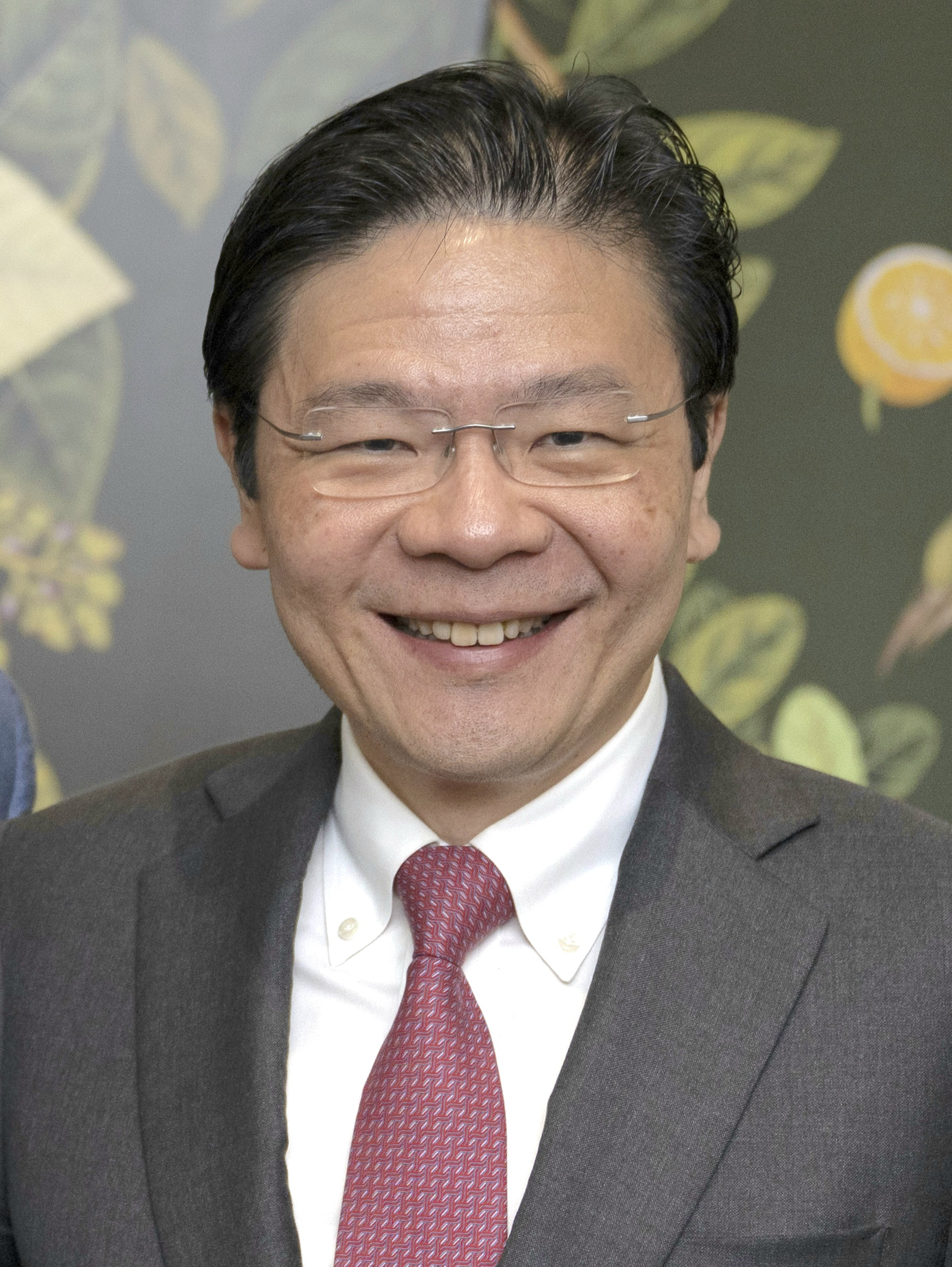
(Singapore) Singapore
Prime Minister Lawrence Wong

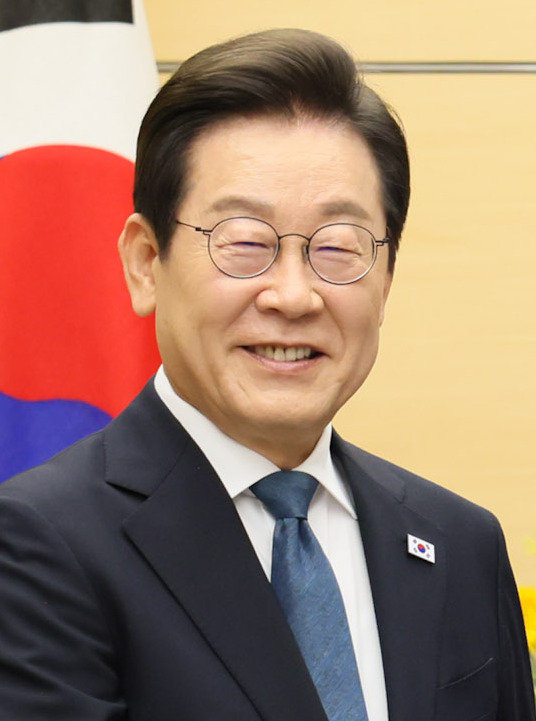
(South Korea) South Korea
President Lee Jae Myung

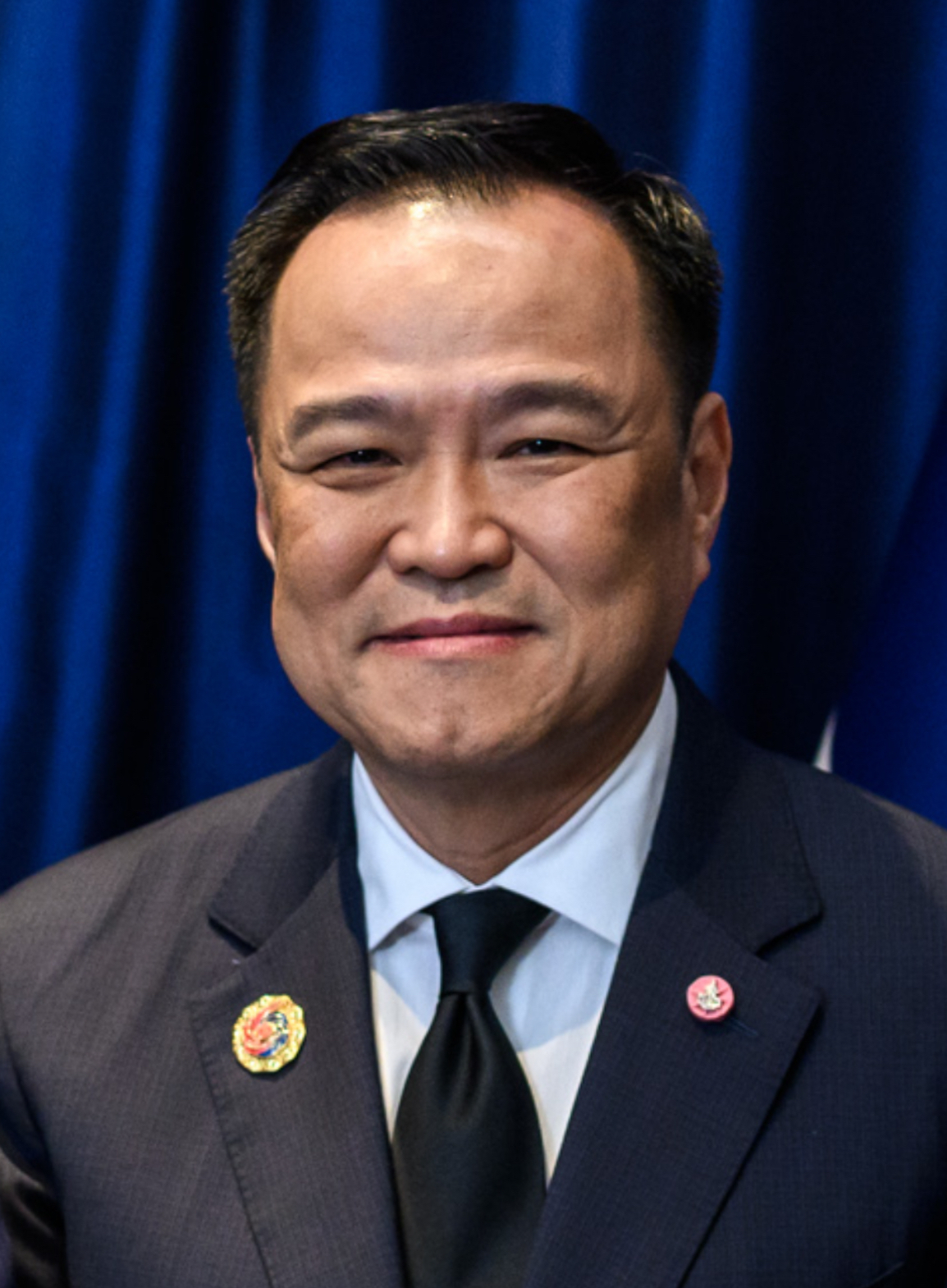
(Thailand) Thailand
Prime Minister Anutin Charnvirakul

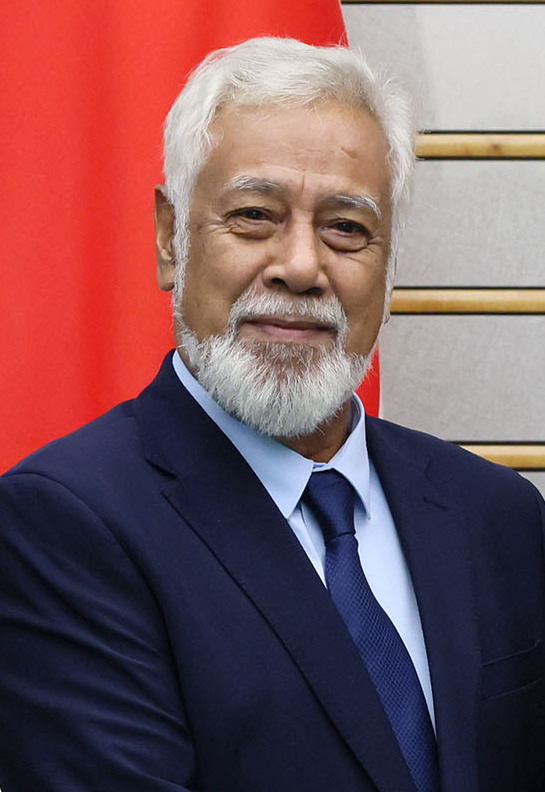
(Timor-Leste) Timor Leste
Prime Minister Xanana Gusmão

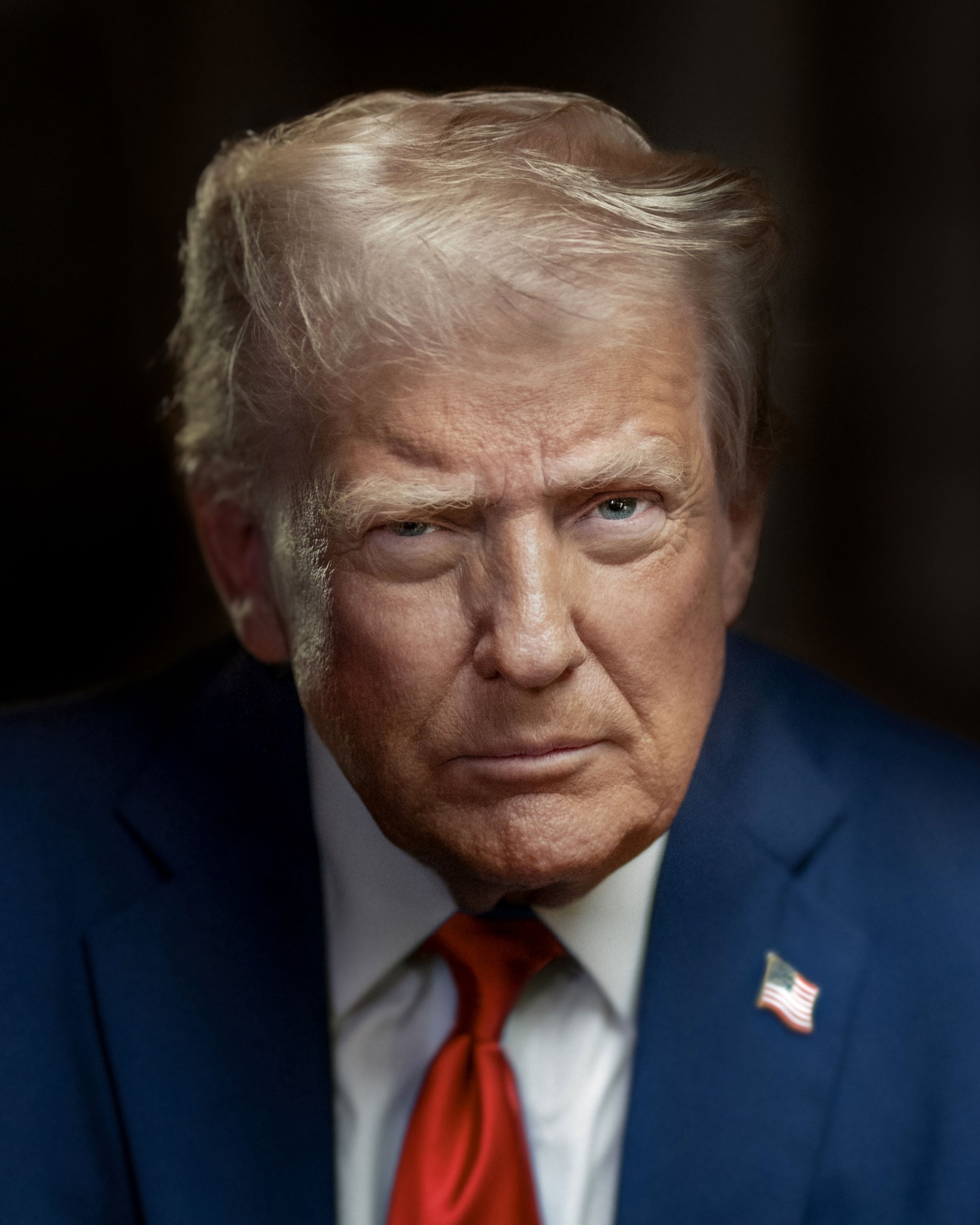
(United States) United States
President Donald Trump

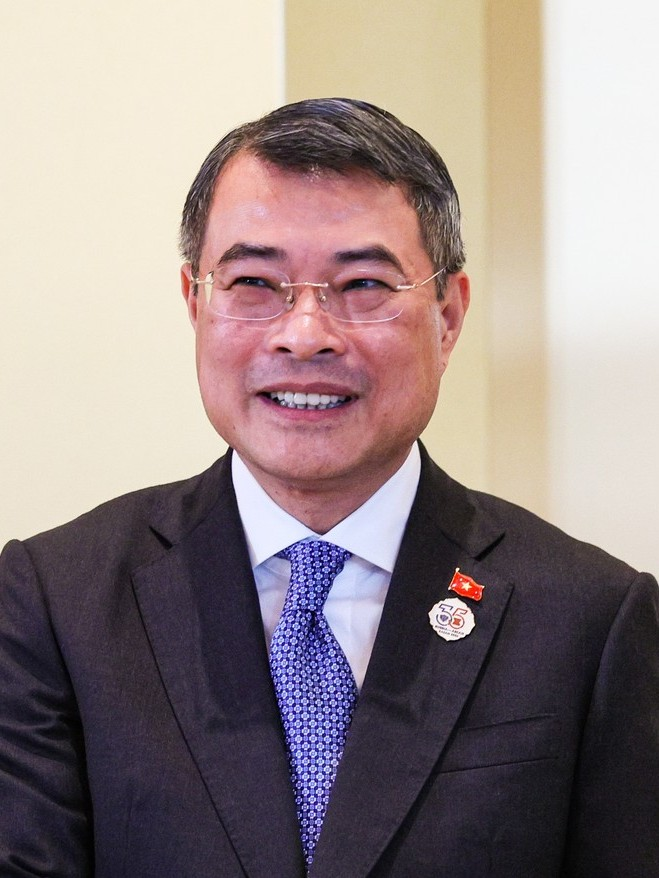
(Vietnam) Vietnam
Prime Minister Lê Minh Hưng

== Energy ==
At the Second EAS the EAS members signed the Cebu Declaration on East Asian Energy Security, a declaration on energy security and biofuels, containing a statement for members to prepare non-binding targets.

== Trade and the Comprehensive Economic Partnership in East Asia (CEPEA) ==
Trade is an important focus for the summit.

As to trade and regional integration the following was noted in the chair's report for the Second EAS:

12. We welcomed ASEAN's efforts towards further integration and community building, and reaffirmed our resolve to work closely together in narrowing development gaps in our region. We reiterated our support for ASEAN's role as the driving force for economic integration in this region. To deepen integration, we agreed to launch a Track To study on a Comprehensive Economic Partnership for East Asia (CEPEA) among EAS participants. We tasked the ASEAN Secretariat to prepare a time frame for the study and to invite all our countries to nominate their respective participants in it.

We welcomed Japan's proposal for an Economic Research Institute for ASEAN and East Asia (ERIA).

The reality appears however that movement towards such a relationship is a long way-off. Lee Kuan Yew has compared the relationship between Southeast Asia and India with that of the European Community and Turkey, and has suggested that a free-trade area involving Southeast Asia and India is 30 to 50 years away.

The members of EAS agreed to study the Japanese proposed Comprehensive Economic Partnership in East Asia (CEPEA). The Track Two report on CEPEA is due to be completed in mid-2008 and at the Third EAS it was agreed this would be considered at the Fourth EAS.

As noted above the Second EAS welcomed the Economic Research Institute for ASEAN and East Asia (ERIA). It was subsequently announced that the ERIA would be established in November 2007 and confirmed at the Third EAS.

The Declaration of the Fifth Anniversary of the East Asia Summit issued at the Fifth EAS provided the Summit declared:

3. To redouble efforts to move progress and cooperation in the EAS further forward, including in the priority areas and in the promotion of regional integration through supporting the realisation of the ASEAN Community and such initiatives as the ASEAN Plus FTAs and other existing wider regional economic integration efforts including studies on East Asia Free Trade Area (EAFTA) and Comprehensive Economic Partnership in East Asia (CEPEA).

India has launched several Look-East connectivity projects with China and ASEAN nations.

== East Asian Community ==
After the EAS was established the issue arose of whether any future East Asia Community would arise from the EAS or ASEAN Plus Three. Prior to the creation of the EAS it appeared that ASEAN Plus Three would take the role of community building in East Asia.

Malaysia felt that it was still the case that the role of the community building fell to ASEAN Plus Three shortly before the second EAS despite "confusion". China apparently agreed whereas Japan and India felt the EAS should be the focus of the East Asian Community.

After the first EAS the feasibility of EAS to have a community building role was questioned with Ong Keng Yong, the secretary-general of ASEAN being quoted as describing the EAS as little more than a "brainstorming forum". Nevertheless, the Chairman's Press Statement for the Seventh ASEAN Plus Three Foreign Ministers’ Meeting Kuala Lumpur, 26 July 2006 said

25. The Ministers welcomed the convening of the East Asia Summit as a forum for dialogue on broad strategic, political and economic issues of common interest with the aim of promoting peace, stability and economic prosperity in East Asia. In this respect, they recognized that the East Asia Summit could make a significant contribution to the achievement of the long-term goal of establishing an East Asian community.

It appeared that over time following the first EAS the focus was less on whether the EAS has a role in community building to what the role and whether it was secondary to ASEAN Plus Three. By mid-2006 the Chinese news site Xinhua Net suggested the community would arise through a two-phase process with ASEAN Plus Three as the first phase and the EAS as the second phase. The China-India joint declaration of 21 November 2006 linked, at paragraph 43, the EAS with the East Asian Community process.

The concentric circle model of the community process with ASEAN at the centre, ASEAN Plus Three at the next band and the East Asia Summit at the outer band is supported by the Second Joint Statement on East Asia Cooperation Building on the Foundations of ASEAN Plus Three Cooperation which said:

III. Looking Forward to a Decade of Consolidation and Closer Integration (2007–2017)

A. Defining the Objectives and Roles of the ASEAN Plus Three Cooperation in the Emerging Regional Architecture

1. We reaffirmed that the ASEAN Plus Three Process would remain as the main vehicle towards the long-term goal of building an East Asian community, with ASEAN as the driving force.
...

3. We recognised and supported the mutually reinforcing and complementary roles of the ASEAN Plus Three process and such regional fora as EAS, ARF, APEC and ASEM to promote East Asian community building.

4. We reiterated that East Asian integration is an open, transparent, inclusive, and forward-looking process for mutual benefits and support internationally shared values to achieve peace, stability, democracy and prosperity in the region. Guided by the vision for durable peace and shared prosperity in East Asia and beyond, we will stand guided by new economic flows, evolving strategic interactions and the belief to continue to engage all interested countries and organisations towards the realisation of an open regional architecture capable of adapting to changes and new dynamism.

On any view, community building is not a short-term project. However, after the second EAS, the Indian Prime Minister Manmohan Singh was confident that the EAS would lead to an East Asia Community. China had also apparently accepted this was the case.

The Comprehensive Economic Partnership for East Asia (CEPEA) is expected to be a first step in the community building process. The second EAS remains a proposal.

It has been suggested that as the EAS consists of an "anti-region" the prospects of it forming a community are less than likely.

== Relationship with ASEAN Plus Three ==
The relationship between the EAS on one hand and ASEAN Plus Three on the other is still not clear. As discussed above, some countries are more supportive of the narrower ASEAN Plus Three grouping whereas others support the broader, more inclusive EAS. ASEAN Plus Three, which has been meeting since December 1997 has a history, including the Chiang Mai Initiative which appears to have led to the development of the Asian Monetary Unit. This may be significant for those advocating a broader role for EAS in the future.

The tension between the groupings extends to the respective members' intentions towards future Free Trade Agreements with China and South Korea focused on ASEAN Plus Three and Japan on the broader EAS members.

The 1997 Asian financial crisis had demonstrated the need for regional groupings and initiatives. It was during this time ASEAN Plus Three had commenced and it was also during this time that the East Asian caucus was being discussed.

The EAS is just one regional grouping and some members down play its significance, the former Australian Prime Minister John Howard has stated that the EAS was secondary as a regional summit to APEC which has on his view a premier role. Not all members of the EAS, notably India, are members of APEC. However, as the EAS meetings are scheduled with the ASEAN Plus Three meetings (they both follow the annual ASEAN meetings) and all members of ASEAN Plus Three are members of EAS the ability of the two forums to remain relevant given the existence of the other remains in question. China has stated its preference for both EAS and ASEAN Plus Three to exist side by side.

The relationship between APEC, ASEAN Plus Three and the EAS remained unresolved heading into the 2007 APEC meeting. Following the meeting the then Malaysian Prime Minister Abdullah Ahmad Badawi described ASEAN Plus Three as the primary vehicle and implied APEC was the lesser of the three. At the same time a Malaysian commentator writing in a Singaporean newspaper described concentric circles for the three with ASEAN Plus Three at the centre and APEC at the outer, also suggested the Nikai Initiative, with its regional OECD like plans, might overtaking the remaining role for APEC.

== Countries joining the Summit process ==
=== Russia ===
Russia participated in the first EAS as an observer at the invitation of 2005 host Malaysia and requested to become a member. Its request to become a future member received support from China and India.

The membership of EAS was to be considered by ASEAN on a case-by-case basis. ASEAN decided to freeze new "membership" of EAS for the second and third summits.

The status of potential future members was discussed in the Chairman's Statement of the 16th ASEAN Summit (9 April 2010) in these terms:

43. We recognized and supported the mutually reinforcing roles of the ASEAN+3 process, the East Asia Summit (EAS), and such regional forums as the ASEAN Regional Forum (ARF), to promote the East Asian cooperation and dialogue towards the building of a community in East Asia. In this connection, we encouraged Russia and the US to deepen their engagement in an evolving regional architecture, including the possibility of their involvement with the EAS through appropriate modalities, taking into account the Leaders-led, open and inclusive nature of the EAS.

ASEAN formally invited the United States and Russia to join the group from 2011.

=== United States ===
Japan and India supported inclusion of the United States and Russia prior to their invitation to join the East Asia Summit.

US President Barack Obama declared his country "an Asia Pacific nation" during his first year in office. Subsequently, US Secretary of State Hillary Clinton attended the Fifth EAS in October 2010 and President Obama attended the Sixth EAS in November 2011.

=== ASEAN + 8 ===
In April and May 2010 it was discussed that the roles for Russia and the United States may be to create a new grouping "ASEAN + 8" including the East Asia Summit members together with the United States and Russia. ASEAN + 8 may not meet as regularly as the East Asia Summit due to the logistical difficulties in the United States President committing to an annual Asian meeting. Such a meeting could be held every two to three years to coincide with the APEC meeting occurring in Asia.

== Potential future members ==
=== East Timor and Papua New Guinea ===
East Timor is a candidate for ASEAN membership, with the organisation agreeing in principle to admit the country, while Papua New Guinea has shown an intention to join; presumably new members of ASEAN would also join the EAS.

=== Other countries and groupings ===
Over several years, especially shortly the commencement of the summits, other countries have been connected with the EAS.

In 2006, Pakistan and Mongolia were proposed as future members by Malaysia. Mongolia was mentioned again by Vietnam, the then chair, in 2010.

In 2007, Pakistan and Bangladesh were raised by Japan as possible members.

In 2007, the European Union indicated it wishes to have a role as an observer.

In 2008, the Arab League held talks and expressed its desire to have a role as an observer.

In 2017, Sri Lanka and Maldives were proposed to be possible members of East Asia Summit. Prime Minister of Canada Justin Trudeau attended as guest. He had arrived directly from the APEC 2017 summit held in Da Nang, Vietnam.

== See also ==
- Comprehensive Economic Partnership for East Asia
- Regional Comprehensive Economic Partnership
- Greater East Asia Co-Prosperity Sphere: unrelated concept in the mid-20th century
- Asian Monetary Unit
- ASEAN
  - ASEAN Free Trade Area: The FTA arrangements between the 10 members of ASEAN
  - ASEAN Summit: held jointly with the EAS
