= Fourth East Asia Summit =

- Host country: Thailand
- Date: October 23—25, 2009
- Cities: Cha-am and Hua Hin
- Participants: EAS members
- Follows: Third East Asia Summit
- Precedes: Fifth East Asia Summit

The Fourth East Asia Summit was held in Cha-am and Hua Hin, Thailand on October 23-25, 2009. The East Asia Summit (EAS) is a pan-Asia forum held annually by the leaders of 16 countries in the East Asian region. EAS meetings are held after annual ASEAN leaders' meetings. The Fourth East Asia Summit was rescheduled several times, had its venue changed and one attempt to hold it was cancelled due to the 2008–2009 Thai political crisis. It was finally held on October 25, 2009.

== Attending delegations ==
The 16 countries participating at the head of state and head of government level were:

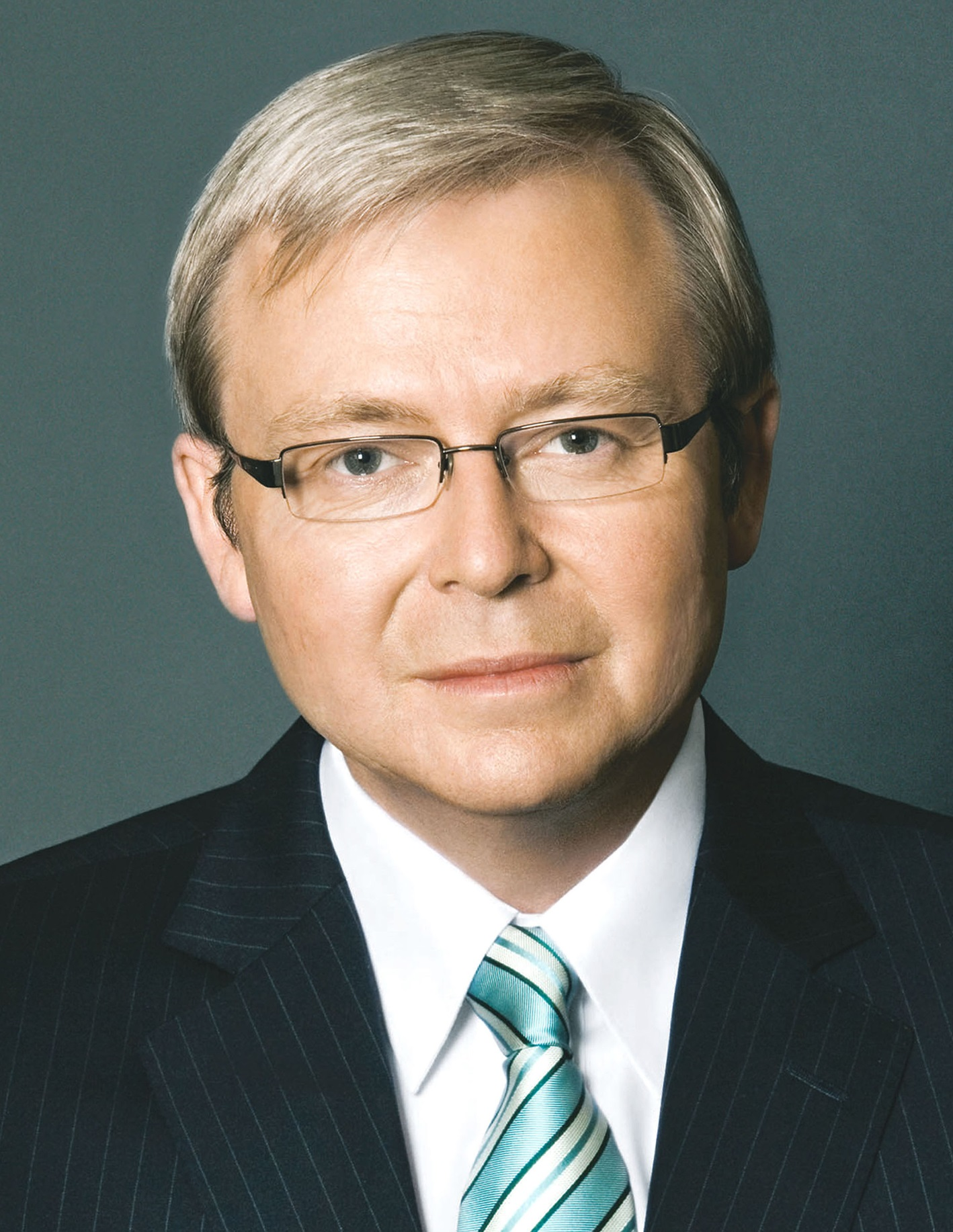
(Australia) Kevin Rudd
Prime Minister

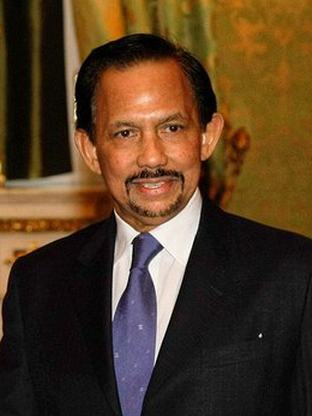
(Brunei) Hassanal Bolkiah
Sultan and Prime Minister

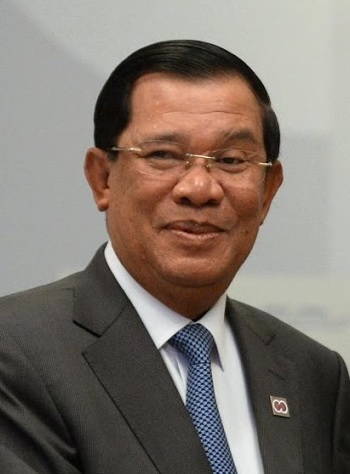
(Cambodia) Hun Sen
Prime Minister

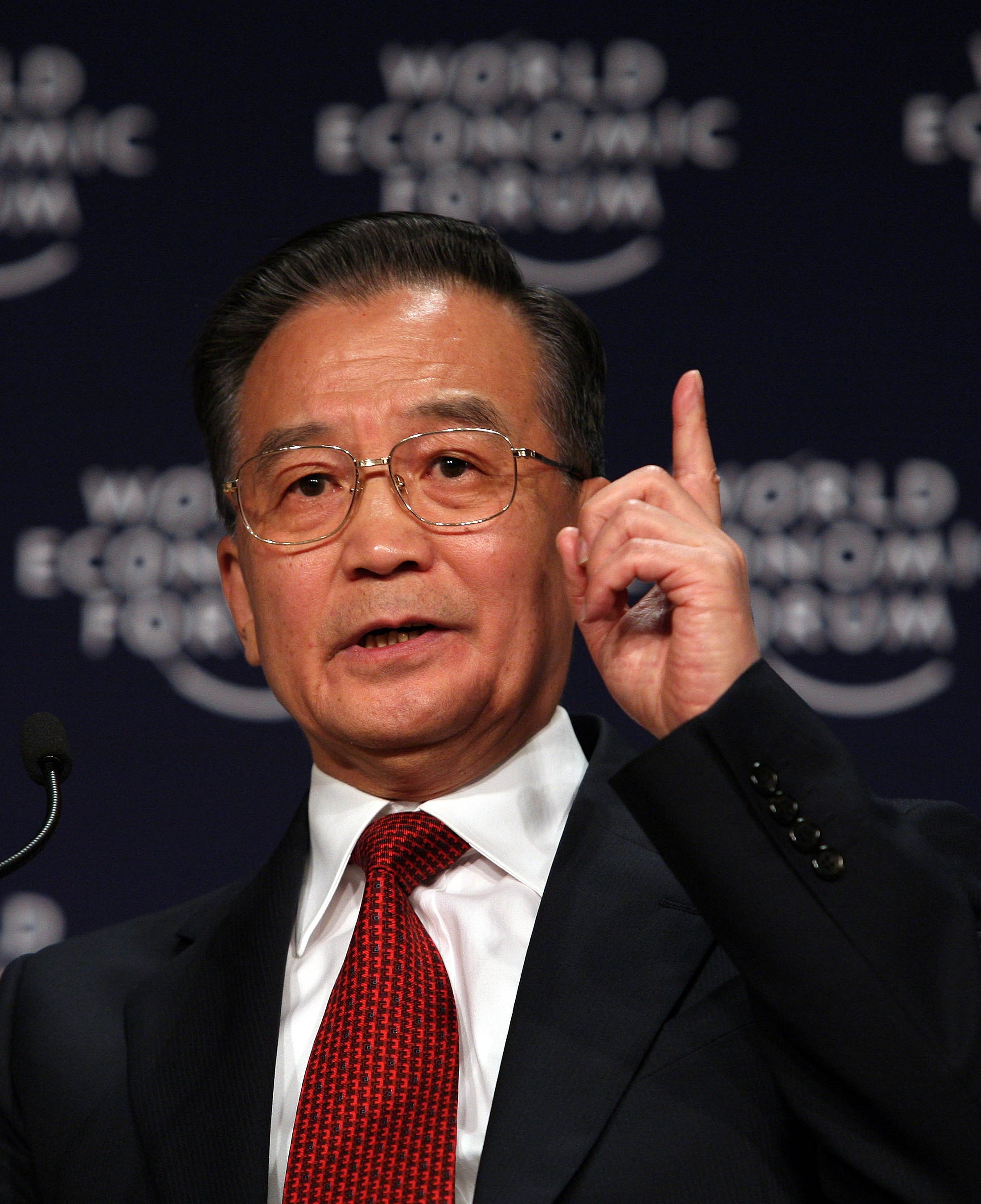
(China) Wen Jiabao
Premier

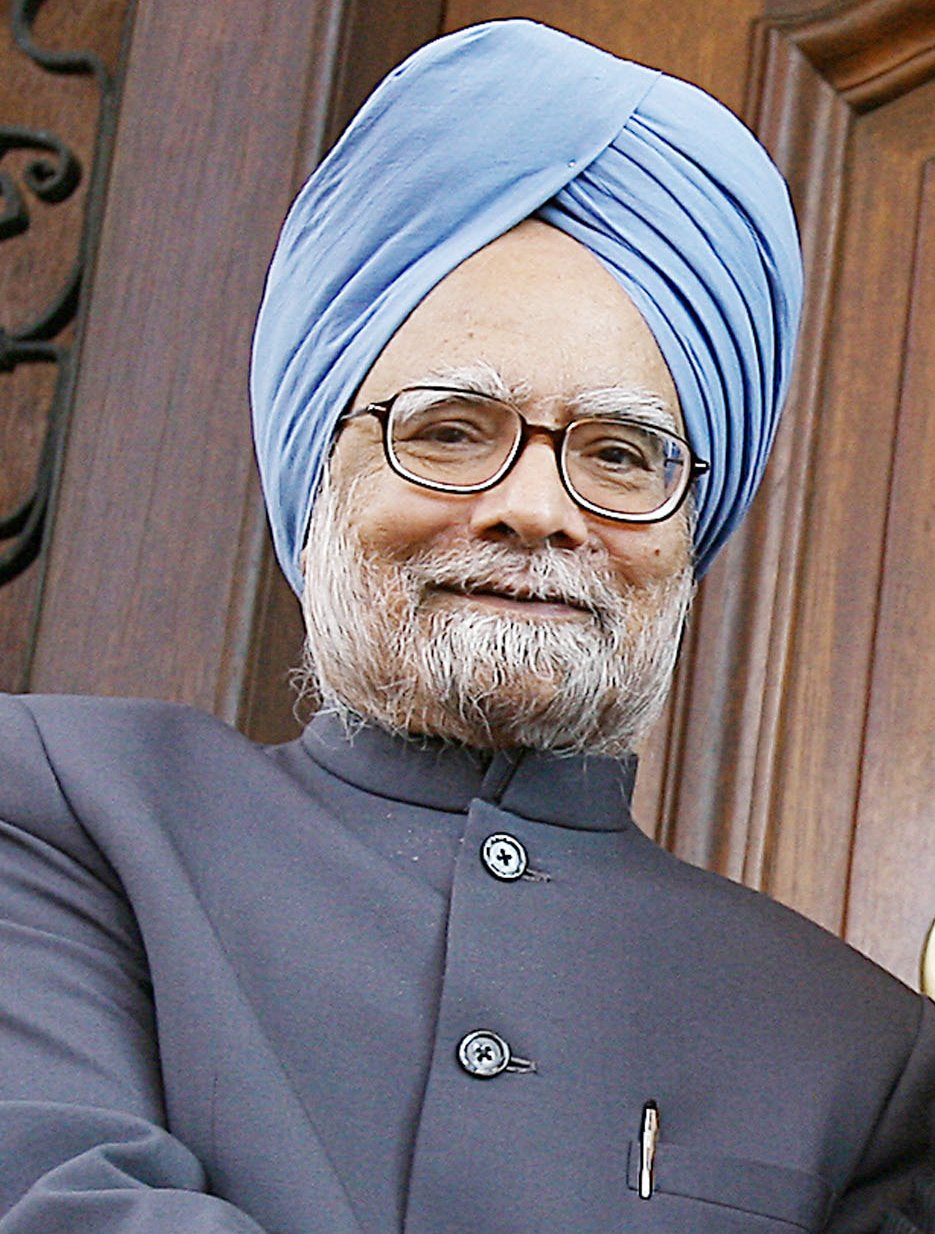
(India) Manmohan Singh
Prime Minister

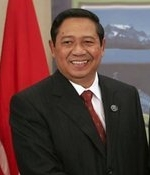
(Indonesia) Susilo Bambang Yudhoyono
President

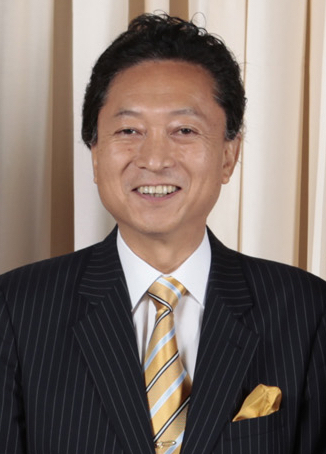
(Japan) Yukio Hatoyama
Prime Minister

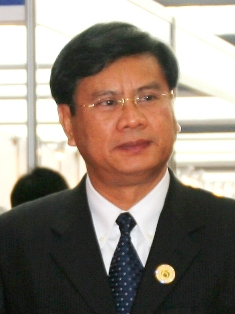
(Laos) Bouasone Bouphavanh
Prime Minister

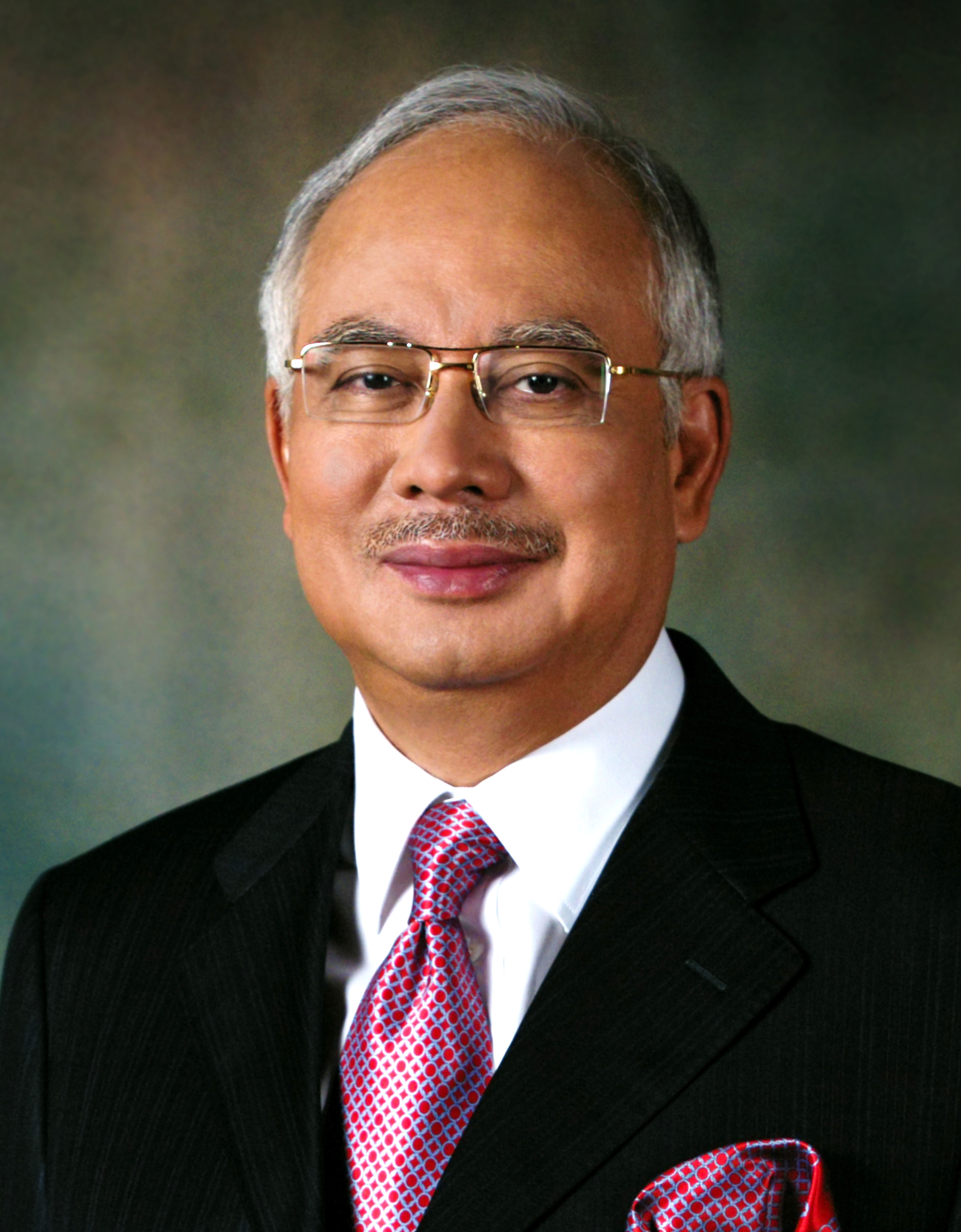
(Malaysia) Najib Tun Razak
Prime Minister

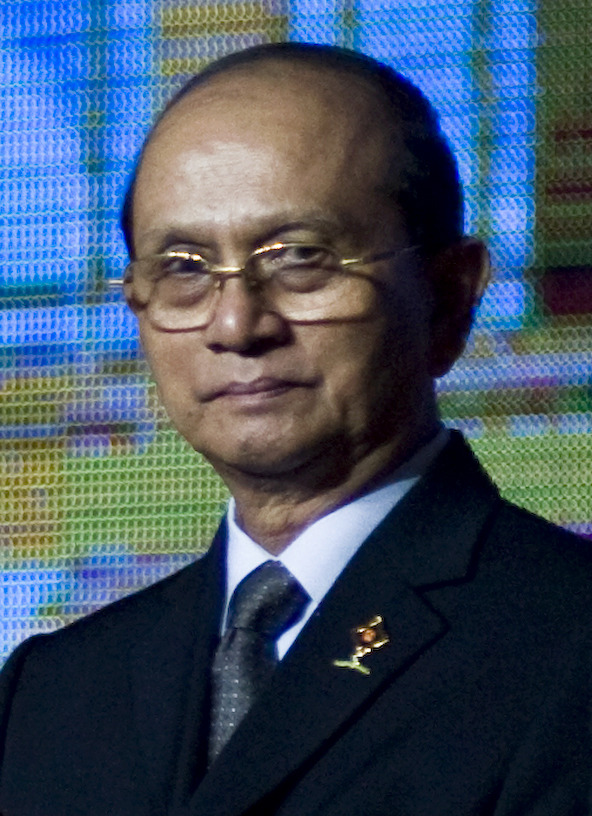
(Myanmar) Thein Sein
Prime Minister

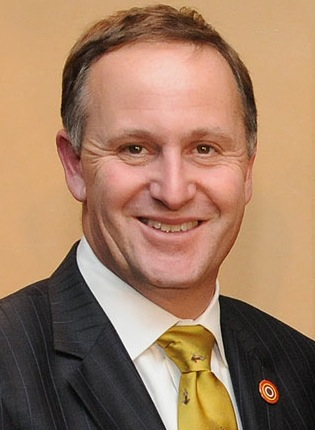
(New Zealand) John Key
Prime Minister

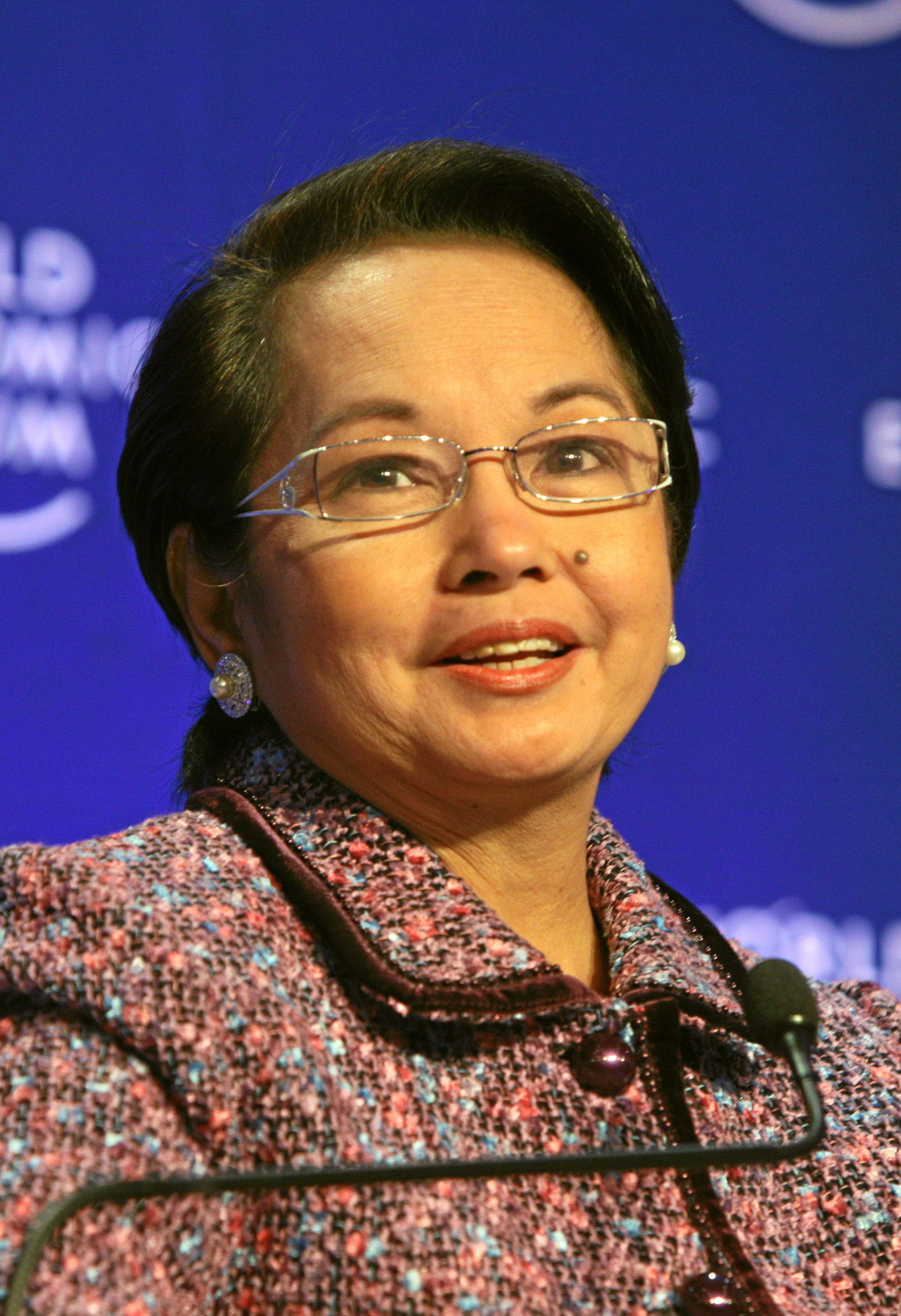
(Philippines) Gloria Macapagal Arroyo
President

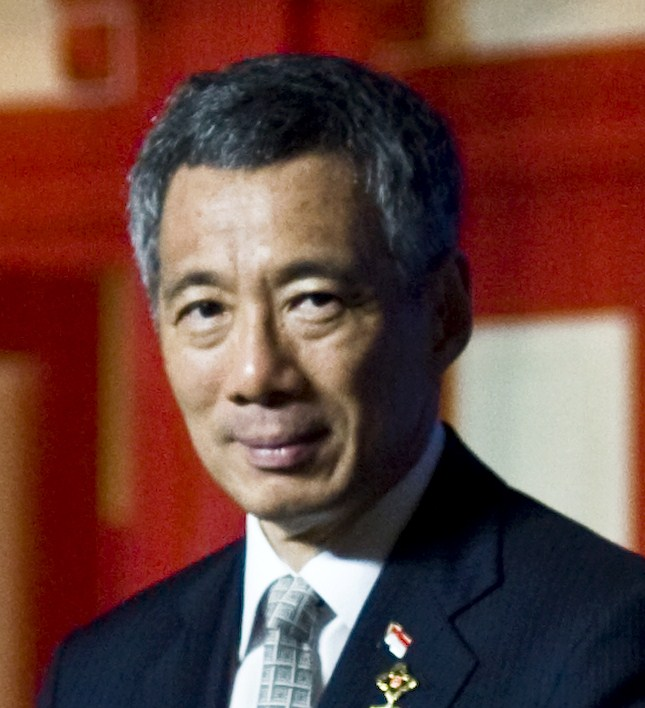
(Singapore) Lee Hsien Loong
Prime Minister

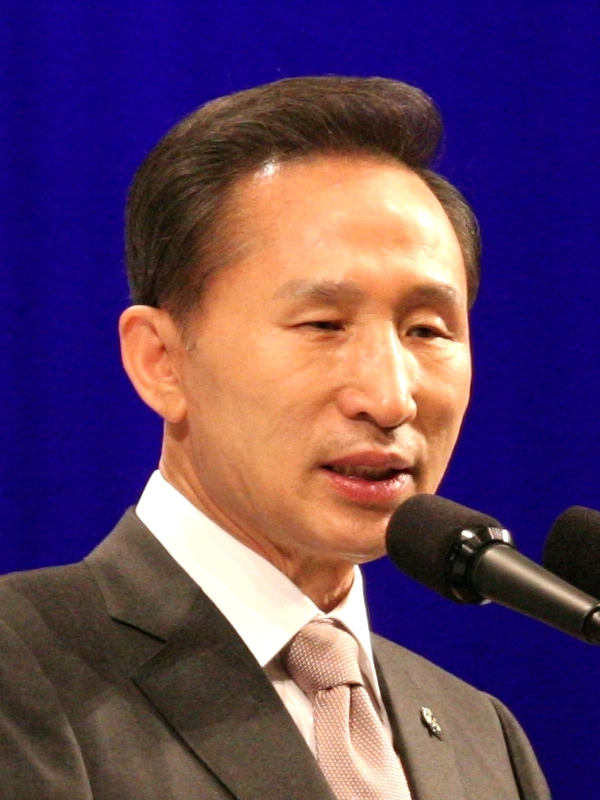
(South Korea) Lee Myung bak
President

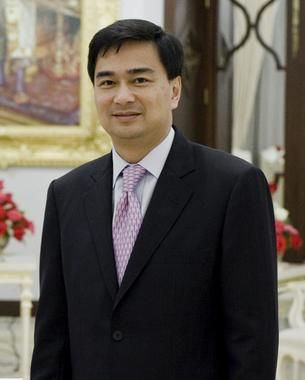
(Thailand) Abhisit Vejjajiva
Prime Minister
(Chairperson)

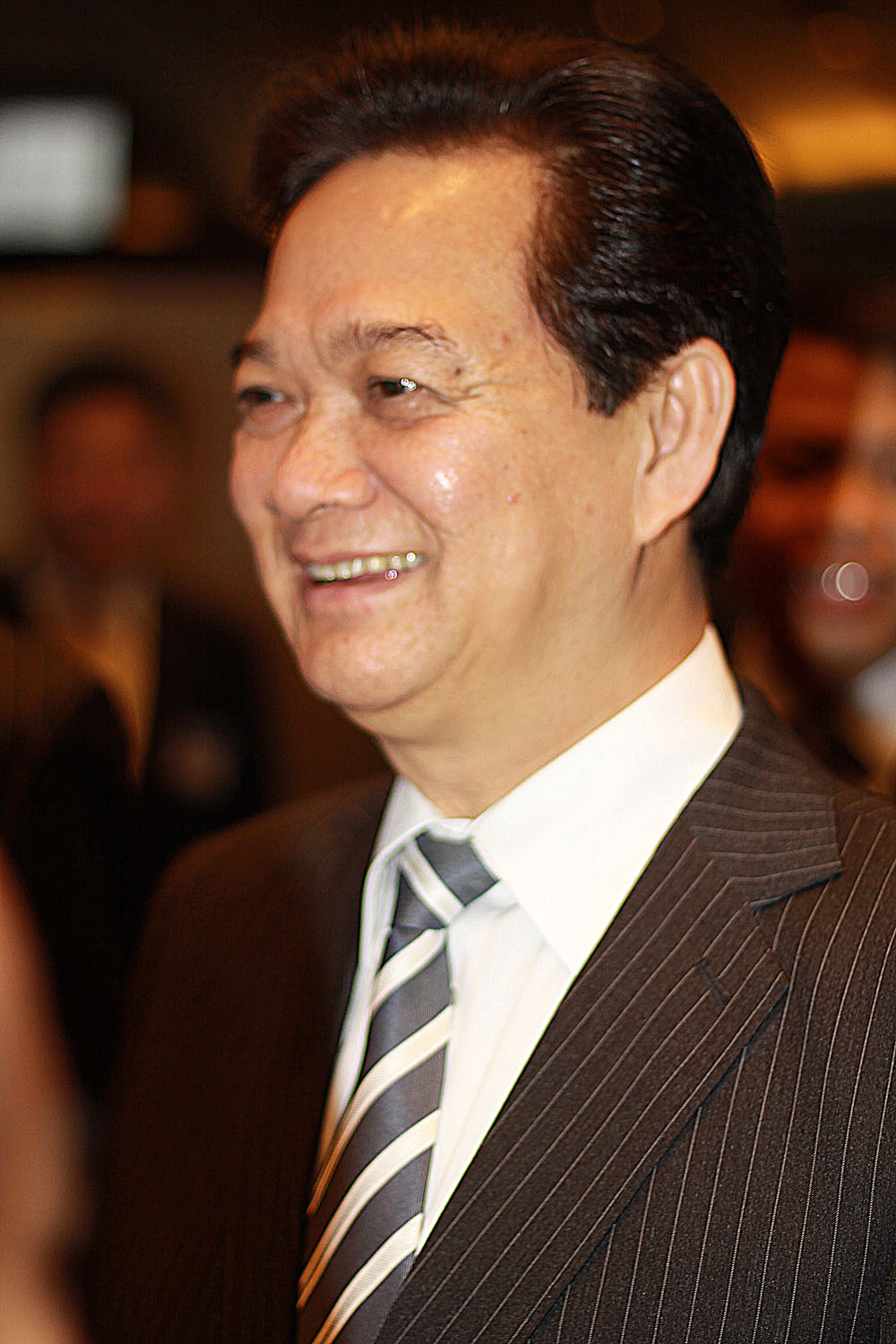
(Vietnam) Nguyễn Tấn Dũng
Prime Minister

== Agenda ==
The 2008 financial crisis was to have been on the agenda of the summit, but by the time of the summit, the immediate crisis had passed.

The summit in October 2009 was scheduled to receive a report on the proposed Comprehensive Economic Partnership for East Asia to potentially establish the world's largest trading bloc. Prime Minister Kevin Rudd of Australia and retired Australian diplomat Richard Woolcott were to address the summit on regional architecture and the idea of an Asia Pacific community. The members were to consider India's plans for the revival of Nalanda University.

== Issues related to staging the fourth EAS ==
Pattaya Exhibition and Convention Hall (PEACH), Royal Cliff Bay, Pattaya

The summit was originally to be held in Bangkok on 17 December 2008. It was announced in late-October 2008 that the summit would be shifted from Bangkok to Chiang Mai due to concerns about political unrest in the capital city.

It was then announced on 2 December 2008 that due to the 2008 Thai political crisis the summit would be postponed from 17 December 2008 to March 2009. On 12 December 2008 Abhisit Vejjajiva indicated that if he became the next prime minister of Thailand he would seek to hold the summit in February 2009.

In January 2009 it was announced that, although the ASEAN Summit had been scheduled for 27 February 2009 to 1 March 2009, those dates were not convenient for the ASEAN delegates and that the East Asia Summit and the ASEAN Plus Three meetings would be held later.

The rescheduling of the heads of government/state of the 16 nations caused the EAS to be tentatively rescheduled for April, coinciding with Easter. The revised date meant that a change of venue from Phuket to Pattaya was contemplated. The revised date and venue were subsequently confirmed. The venue was to be the Pattaya Exhibition and Conference Hall (PEACH).

It was also announced that India would be represented at the summit by Commerce and Industry Minister Kamal Nath, not its prime minister.

== Cancellation of the summit in 2008 and postponement to 2009 ==
Pattaya Exhibition and Conference Hall (PEACH), Royal Cliff Bay, Pattaya, viewed from south. See helipad at left of PEACH roof structure, overlooking the Gulf of Thailand.

On 11 April 2009, anti-Thai government protesters smashed their way into the East Asian summit, forcing the Prime Minister of Thailand, Abhisit Vejjajiva, to cancel the meeting and evacuate foreign leaders by helicopter. Officials did not say whether or when the summit would resume.

Following the cancellation, United Nations Secretary-General Ban Ki-moon expressed regret over the incident. Abhisit Vejjajiva later vowed legal action against anti-government protesters "who reduced a showcase Asian summit to a shambles and exposed the nation to international embarrassment".

During the lead up to the summit, there were also several border clashes between Thailand and Cambodia. The summit was said to be used as an opportunity for discussions on the sidelines between the respective nations' leaders.

== Attendance by leaders ==
Australian Prime Minister Kevin Rudd was en route to the summit from Australia when he was contacted by the Australian Department of Foreign Affairs and advised to return to Australia. The leaders of China, Japan, and South Korea were airlifted out by their Thai hosts, whilst New Zealand Prime Minister John Key did not make it out of Bangkok airport.

== Rescheduling ==
By late-April the Thai government was looking to reschedule the summit to June 2009 in Phuket. There had been earlier reports that Indonesia might seek to host the summit if Thailand could not. Australian press reports suggested it could be held in Vietnam.

In early-May Thailand proposed, at a senior officials meeting, the dates of 13–14 June in Phuket, with a promise of a five kilometre "no rally zone" around the venue.

This revised date was said to be inconvenient for the leaders of Indonesia, India, and New Zealand. The summit was subsequently confirmed as having been rescheduled for 25 October 2009 in Phuket, but then was moved again to Cha-am and Hua Hin.

== Outcomes ==
The summit adopted two documents. The first was a statement on disaster management. The second related to the re-establishment of Nalanda University by India.

The chairman's statement noted:

21. We acknowledged the importance of regional discussions to examine ways to advance the stability and prosperity of the Asia Pacific region. In this connection, we noted with appreciation the following:
(a) the Philippines’s proposal to invite the heads of other regional fora and organizations in Asia-Pacific to future EAS meetings to discuss measures that will protect the region from future economic and financial crisis and strengthen Asia economic cooperation, including through the possible establishment of an economic community of Asia.
(b) Japan's new proposal to reinvigorate the discussion towards building, in the long run, an East Asian community based on the principle of openness, transparency and inclusiveness and

functional cooperation.
(c) Australia's proposal on the Asia Pacific community in which ASEAN will be at its core, will be further discussed at a 1.5 track conference to be organized by Australia in December 2009.

The statement of the ASEAN Plus Three meeting noted that it was "a main vehicle" in building the East Asian Community.
