= List of international prime ministerial trips made by Manmohan Singh =

This is a list of international prime ministerial trips made by Manmohan Singh during his tenure as the Prime Minister of India between May 2004 and May 2014. The first overseas visit was to Thailand to attend the 1st BIMSTEC Summit in July 2004.

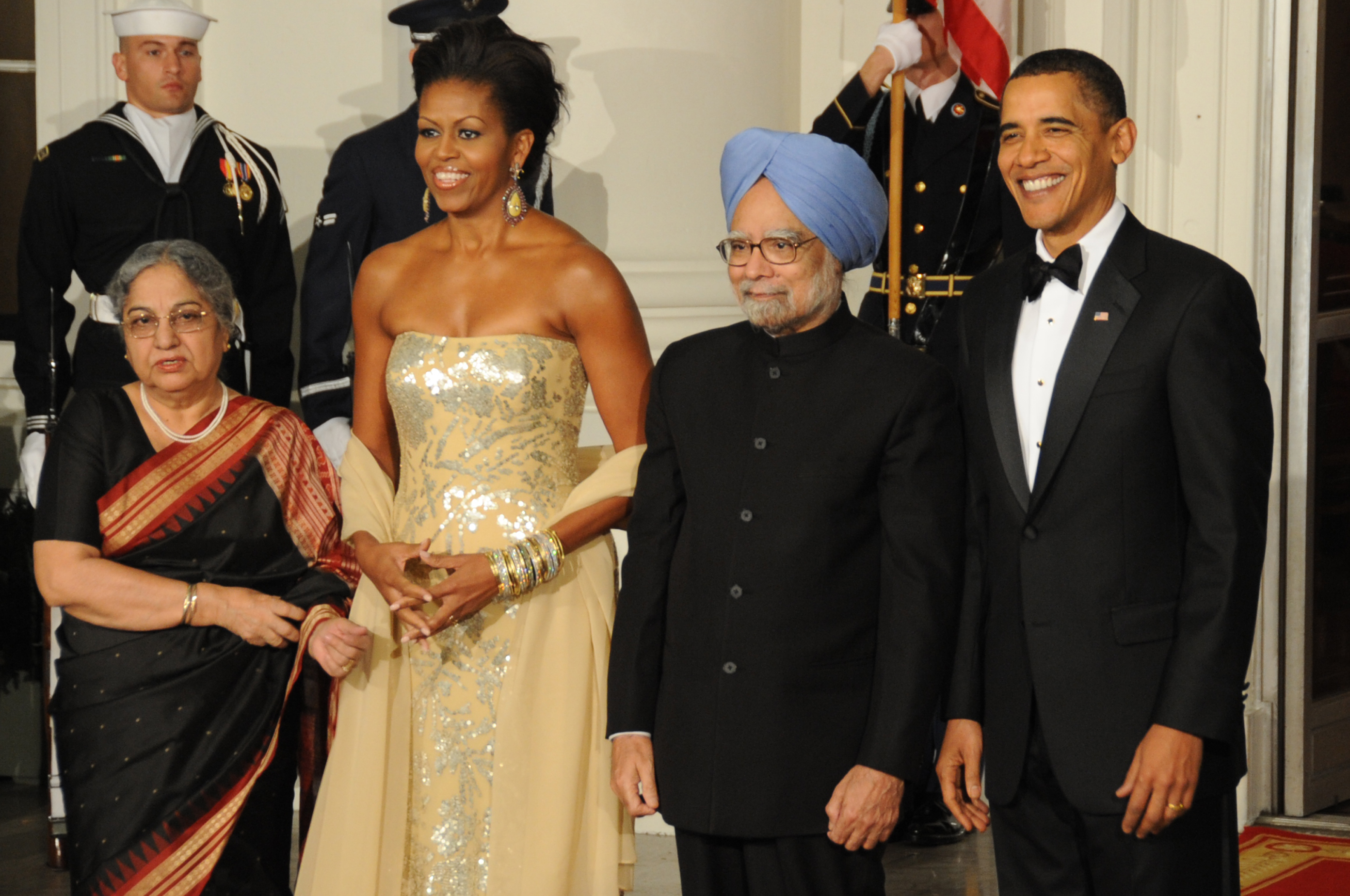
Prime Minister Manmohan Singh and his wife Gursharan Kaur at the state banquet hosted by President Barack Obama and First Lady Michelle Obama at the White House in 2009.

== Summary of international trips ==
In his ten-year long tenure as the Prime Minister, Manmohan Singh made 71 international trips, visiting 46 countries, including visits to the United States to attend the United Nations General Assembly.

Map of international trips made by Manmohan Singh as Prime Minister.

One visit
Two visits
Three visits
Four visits
Five visits
Six or more visits
India

Prime Minister Manmohan Singh's visits by country
Number of visits	Country
1 visit (28)	Belgium, Brunei, Cambodia, Canada, Cuba, Denmark, Egypt, Ethiopia, Finland, Iran, Italy, Kazakhstan, Laos, Maldives, Mauritius, Mexico, Netherlands, Nigeria, Oman, Philippines, Qatar, Saudi Arabia, Sri Lanka, Tanzania, Trinidad and Tobago, Uganda, Uzbekistan, Vietnam
2 visits (7)	Afghanistan, Bangladesh, Bhutan, Malaysia, Myanmar, Singapore, South Korea
3 visits (3)	Brazil, Indonesia, Thailand
4 visits (5)	China, France, Germany, South Africa, United Kingdom
5 visits (1)	Japan
9 visits (1)	Russia
10 visits (1)	United States

== 2004 ==
	Country	Areas visited	Date(s)	Details	Images
1	Thailand	Bangkok	29–31 July	First overseas visit to attend 1st BIMSTEC Summit. Attended the 1st BIMSTEC summit. Met Prime Minister Thaksin Shinawatra. Interacted and held multilateral talks with other participating BIMSTEC leaders.	
2	United Kingdom	London	19–20 September	Official visit. Met with Prime Minister Tony Blair and held bilateral talks with him.	
2	United Nations; United States	New York City	21–26 September	Attended 59th United Nations General Assembly Session and addressed the General Assembly. Called on US President George W. Bush and held multilateral talks other participating leaders including UN Secretary-General Kofi Annan, Afghan President Hamid Karzai, Pakistani President Pervez Musharraf. Also interacted with the leaders of the G4 countries.	
3	European Union; Netherlands	Amsterdam, Binnenhof, The Hague	7–10 November	Attend the EU-India Summit. Met Prime Minister Jan-Peter Balkenende and European Commission President Romano Prodi and participated in talks. Called on Queen Beatrix at Noordeinde Palace and addressed EU-India Business forum meet.	
4	Laos	Vientiane	28–30 November	Attended ASEAN summit and Annual India-ASEAN Summit. Met with Prime Minister Bounnhang Vorachith and President Khamtai Siphandone. Held multilateral talks with other participating ASEAN leaders and the leaders of China, Japan, and Australia. Also flagged off first ASEAN-India Car Rally.	

== 2005 ==
	Country	Areas visited	Date(s)	Details	Images
5	Mauritius	Port Louis	30 March–2 April	Met with Prime Minister Paul Bérenger and President Anerood Jugnauth. Addressed special session of the National Assembly and inaugurated the Ebene City Tower. Also met Chief Justice Ariranga Pillay, Leader of Opposition Navinchandra Ramgoolam and Culture Minister Jaya Krishna Cuttaree.	
6	Indonesia	Jakarta	22–24 April	Attended the Asia-Africa Summit and Golden Jubilee Celebrations of Bandung Conference of 1955. Met with President Susilo Bambang Yudhoyono and held multilateral talks with other participating leaders including Nepalese King Gyanendra, Sri Lankan Prime Minister Mahinda Rajapaksa, Chinese President Hu Jintao.	
7	Russia	Moscow	8–10 May	Attended Victory Day Parade as guest of honour. Met with President Vladimir Putin and other invited heads of state and government.	
8	United Kingdom	London, Auchterarder	6–9 July	Attended 31st G8 summit as guest invitee. Met Prime Minister Tony Blair and the participating leaders of France, Japan, Germany and Brazil. Received honorary doctorate of civil law from Oxford University and addressed the occasion of 75th anniversary of India House, London.	
9	United States	Washington, D.C.	16–21 July	Official visit to the United States. Accorded formal welcome at White House lawn, met and held talks with President George W. Bush and attended banquet hosted in his honour by President Bush and First Lady Laura Bush. Addressed a special joint session of the United States Congress and met several floor leaders.	
10	Afghanistan	Kabul	28–29 August	Met President Hamid Karzai and visited the Mazar at Bagh-e-Babur. Laid foundation stone of new Parliament Building along with former King Mohammad Zahir Shah.	
11	France	Paris	12–14 September	Met and held strategic talks with President Jacques Chirac at Élysée Palace. Also met Prime Minister Dominique de Villepin at Hôtel Matignon.	
11	United Nations; United States	New York City	15–17 September	Addressed the 60th session of the United Nations General Assembly. Participated in the launch of UN Democracy Fund along with US President George W. Bush and UN Secretary-General Kofi Annan. Interacted with other participating leaders including Malaysian Prime Minister Abdullah Ahmad Badawi, Chinese President Hu Jintao, Pakistani President Pervez Musharraf.	
12	Bangladesh	Dhaka	11–13 November	Attended 14th SAARC Summit. Met with Prime Minister Khaleda Zia. Visited the Mausoleum of Ziaur Rahman and addressed the plenary session of summit. Also held multilateral talks with other participating SAARC leaders.	
13	Russia	Moscow	4–7 December	Attended Annual India-Russia Summit. Met President Vladimir Putin at Grand Kremlin Palace and witnessed the signing of important documents. Also met First Deputy Prime Minister Sergei Ivanov and Industry Minister Viktor Khristenko. Received the title of "Professor Honoris causa" by the Moscow State University and visited the Tomb of the Unknown Soldier.	
14	Malaysia	Kuala Lumpur	12–14 December	Attended ASEAN Summit, 1st East Asia Summit and Annual India-ASEAN Summit. Met with Prime Minister Abdullah Ahmad Badawi and held multilateral talks with other participating leaders including Vietnamese Prime Minister Phan Văn Khải, South Korean President Roh Moo-hyun, Japanese Prime Minister Junichiro Koizumi.	

== 2006 ==
	Country	Areas visited	Date(s)	Details	Images
15	Germany	Berlin	22–24 April	Attend Annual India-Germany Summit. Attended Mayor's reception in Hanover. Welcomed by Chancellor Angela Merkel and met and held talks with her. Inaugurated inaugural Hannover Messe along with the Chancellor and also called on President Horst Köhler. Also met Vice-Chancellor Frank-Walter Steinmeier and former Chancellor Gerhard Schröder.	
15	Uzbekistan	Tashkent	24–26 April	Received by Prime Minister Shavkat Mirziyoyev and then hosted by President Islam Karimov. Met and held talks with him and attended banquet hosted by President Karimov.	
16	Russia	Saint Petersburg	16–18 July	Attended the 32nd G8 summit and G8+5 Outreach Summit. Met with President Vladimir Putin and attended plenary session. Also met other participating leaders including US President George W. Bush, Chinese President Hu Jintao, Japanese Prime Minister Junichiro Koizumi, German Chancellor Angela Merkel.	
17	Brazil	Brasília	10–14 September	Attended 1st IBSA Summit. Met with President Luiz Inácio Lula da Silva and attended IBSA plenary session and also met South African President Thabo Mbeki.	
17	Cuba	Havana	14–16 September	Attended 14th Non-Aligned Movement Summit. Met with Acting President Raúl Castro and attended heads of state plenary. Met with President Fidel Castro and met other participating leaders including Pakistani President Pervez Musharraf, Malaysian Prime Minister Abdullah Badawi, Mauritian Prime Minister Navinchandra Ramgoolam, Mongolian President Nambaryn Enkhbayar.	
18	South Africa	Durban, Johannesburg	30 September– 3 October	Official visit in connection with 100th anniversary of Mahatma Gandhi's Satyagraha. Welcomed and hosted by President Thabo Mbeki and witnessed signing of documents between both nations. Also met former President Nelson Mandela and received Medal of Appreciation from the Executive Mayor of Johannesburg Amos Masondo.	
19	United Kingdom	London	9–12 October	Official visit. Met with Prime Minister Tony Blair. Conferred with honorary doctorate degree from Cambridge University and met Prince Philip, Duke of Edinburgh. Also met Foreign Secretary Margaret Beckett and Chancellor of the Exchequer Gordon Brown.	
19	European Union; Finland	Helsinki	12–14 October	Attended the India-EU Summit. Participated in EU-India talks with Prime Minister Matti Vanhanen, President of the European Commission José Manuel Barroso and EU High Representative Javier Solana. Met with President Tarja Halonen at Presidential Palace, Helsinki.	
20	Japan	Tokyo	13–16 December	Official visit to Japan and inaugurated Festival of India in Tokyo. Welcomed by Prime Minister Shinzo Abe and attended banquet hosted by him. Addressed special joint sitting of the National Diet and met several members of the Japanese cabinet including Foreign Minister Taro Aso, Finance Minister Kōji Omi, former Prime Minister Yoshiro Mori. Also called on Emperor Akihito at Imperial Palace, Tokyo.	

== 2007 ==
	Country	Areas visited	Date(s)	Details	Images
21	Philippines	Mandaue	13–15 January	Attended ASEAN Summit, 2nd East Asia Summit and Annual India-ASEAN Summit. Met with President Gloria Macapagal Arroyo. Also met other participating leaders including New Zealand Prime Minister Helen Clark and Chinese Premier Wen Jiabao.	
22	Germany	Berlin	6–9 June	Attended 34th G8 summit and G8+5 Outreach Summit. Met with Chancellor Angela Merkel and other participating leaders. Held meetings with G5 leaders, Nigerian President Umaru Musa Yar'Adua and UN Secretary-General Ban Ki-moon.	
23	Nigeria	Abuja	14–16 October	Welcomed and accorded ceremonial reception at Aso Villa. Met with President Umaru Musa Yar'Adua and attended state banquet. Addressed special joint sitting of the National Assembly. Met Foreign Minister Ojo Maduekwe, Health Minister Adenike Grange and Defence Minister Yayale Ahmed.	
23	South Africa	Johannesburg	17–18 October	Attended 2nd IBSA summit. Addressed plenary session and met and held bilateral and trilateral talks with President Thabo Mbeki and Brazilian President Luiz Inácio Lula da Silva.	
24	Russia	Moscow	11–13 November	Attended Annual India-Russia Summit. Met with President Vladimir Putin and witnessed signing of various documents. Also met with Prime Minister Viktor Zubkov.	
25	Singapore	Singapore	20–21 November	Attended ASEAN Summit, 3rd East Asia Summit and Annual India-ASEAN Summit. Addressed ASEAN plenary and met with Prime Minister Lee Hsien Loong. Also met other participating leaders including Burmese Prime Minister Thein Sein, Chinese Premier Wen Jiabao and Japanese Prime Minister Yasuo Fukuda.	
25	Uganda	Kampala	22–25 November	Attended 20th Commonwealth Heads of Government Meeting. Welcomed by President Museveni and addressed the heads of government plenary. Met with other participating leaders including British Prime Minister Gordon Brown, Botswanan President Festus Mogae, Malaysian Prime Minister Abdullah Badawi, Sri Lankan President Mahinda Rajapaksa.	

== 2008 ==
	Country	Areas visited	Date(s)	Details	Images
26	China	Beijing	13–15 January	Met with Premier Wen Jiabao. Accorded ceremonial welcome at Great Hall of the People and witnessed signing of various documents and attended dinner hosted by Premier Jiabao. Visited Beijing Olympic Project Exhibition Centre. Met with President Hu Jintao, Chairman of the Standing Committee of the National People's Congress Wu Bangguo and Vice Premier Hui Liangyu.	
27	Bhutan	Thimphu	16–17 May	Welcomed by Prime Minister Jigme Thinley at Paro International Airport and received ceremonial reception. Met with Prime Minister Thinley and attended banquet hosted by him. Addressed a special joint sitting of the National Assembly and called on King Jigme Khesar Namgyel Wangchuck and 4th King Jigme Singye Wangchuck.	
28	Japan	Tōyako	7–9 July	Attended 34th G8 summit and G8+5 Outreach Summit. Met with Prime Minister Yasuo Fukuda and leaders of the G8 countries, other 5 outreach countries and the leaders of the BRIC countries. Also met UN Secretary-General Ban Ki-moon, Indonesian President Susilo Bambang Yudhoyono.	
29	Sri Lanka	Colombo	1–3 August	Attended 15th SAARC summit and addressed SAARC plenary session. Met with President Mahinda Rajapaksa and Prime Minister Ratnasiri Wickremanayake. Also met leaders of other SAARC countries and leaders of political parties of Sri Lanka.	
30	United Nations; United States	New York City, Washington, D.C.	23–27 September	Addressed the 63rd session of the United Nations General Assembly. Called on US President George W. Bush at White House and met leaders of other UN member countries on the sidelines including Pakistani President Asif Ali Zardari, British Prime Minister Gordon Brown, Namibian President Hifikepunye Pohamba. Also attended reception hosted by US Ambassador Ronen Sen.	
30	European Union; France	Marseille, Paris	28 September– 1 October	Attended 9th India-EU Summit. Interacted with EU leaders including French President Nicolas Sarkozy, EU Commission President José Manuel Barroso. Later separately met French President Sarkozy at Élysée Palace and witnessed signing of various documents.	
31	Japan	Tokyo	21–23 October	Attended Annual India-Japan Summit. Met with Prime Minister Taro Aso and witnessed signing of various treaties and documents. Called on Emperor Akihito at Imperial Palace, Tokyo. Met former Prime Minister Yoshirō Mori, Foreign Minister Hirofumi Nakasone, and other business leaders.	
31	China	Beijing	24–25 October	Attended 7th Asia–Europe Meeting and was welcomed by Chinese Premier Wen Jiabao. Addressed plenary session of the meeting and called on President Hu Jintao. Also met other participating leaders including Pakistani Prime Minister Yousuf Raza Gillani, Italian Prime Minister Silvio Berlusconi, Mongolian President Nambaryn Enkhbayar, Bulgarian President Georgi Parvanov, Thai Prime Minister Somchai Wongsawat.	
32	Oman	Muscat	8–9 November	Received and ceremonial welcomed at Muscat International Airport and accorded guard of honour. Met with Deputy Prime Minister Fahd bin Mahmoud al Said and held talks with him, witnessed signing of documents and attended banquet hosted by him. Met with Sultan Qaboos bin Said and addressed Indian community in Oman.	
32	Qatar	Doha	9–10 November	Met and held bilateral talks with Prime Minister Hamad bin Jassim bin Jaber Al Thani and witnessed the signing of documents. Met with Emir Hamad bin Khalifa Al Thani and also addressed the Indian community in Doha.	
33	United States	Washington, D.C.	14–15 November	Attended 1st G20 Summit or Washington Summit on Financial Markets and the World Economy. Met with President George W. Bush at White House and attended banquet hosted by him. Participated in plenary discussions and met other participant leaders.	

== 2009 ==
	Country	Areas visited	Date(s)	Details	Images
34	United Kingdom	London	31 March– 3 April	Attended the 2nd G20 summit and participated in plenary session. Met Prime Minister Gordon Brown and attended banquet hosted by him. Also met other participating leaders in the sidelines including US President Barack Obama. Called on Queen Elizabeth II at Buckingham Palace.	
35	Russia	Yekaterinburg	15–17 June	First overseas visit of second term. Attended 1st BRIC summit and SCO summit. Met with President Dmitry Medvedev and other participating leaders including Chinese President Hu Jintao, Pakistani President Asif Ali Zardari and Kazakh President Nursultan Nazarbayev.	
36	Italy	L'Aquila	7–10 July	Attended 35th G8 summit and G8+5 summit. Met with Prime Minister Silvio Berlusconi and other participating G8 and G5 leaders. Also attended meeting on food security in the sidelines of the summit.	
36	France	Paris	13–14 July	Attended Bastille Day parade as guest of honour. Met with President Nicolas Sarkozy at Hôtel de Marigny and Justice Minister Michèle Alliot-Marie.	
36	Egypt	Sharm El Sheikh	14–16 July	Attended 15th Non-Aligned Movement Summit and addressed the NAM plenary. Met with President Hosni Mubarak and other participating leaders including Pakistani Prime Minister Yousuf Raza Gillani, Sri Lankan President Mahinda Rajapaksa, Vietnamese President Nguyễn Minh Triết and Bangladeshi Prime Minister Sheikh Hasina.	
37	United States	Pittsburgh	24–25 September	Attended the 3rd G20 summit and met President Barack Obama and attended banquet hosted by him. Also met other participating leaders including Australian Prime Minister Kevin Rudd, British Prime Minister Gordon Brown, Canadian Prime Minister Stephen Harper, Dutch Prime Minister Jan Peter Balkenende.	
38	Thailand	Cha-am, Hua Hin	23–25 October	Attended the ASEAN Summit, 4th East Asia Summit and Annual India-ASEAN Summit. Met with Prime Minister Abhisit Vejjajiva and attended gala dinner hosted by him. Met other ASEAN leaders and other participating leaders including Japanese Prime Minister Yukio Hatoyama and Chinese Premier Wen Jiabao.	
39	United States	Washington, D.C.	21–26 November	State visit. Accorded ceremonial welcome at White House lawns and met with President Barack Obama and attended state banquet hosted by him. Also met Vice President Joe Biden, Secretary of State Hillary Clinton, Treasury Secretary Timothy Geithner, Defence Secretary Robert Gates and various other eminent personalities.	
39	Trinidad and Tobago	Port of Spain	27–29 November	Attended the 21st Commonwealth Heads of Government Meeting. Met Prime Minister Patrick Manning and other participating leaders including British Prime Minister Gordon Brown, Canadian Prime Minister Stephen Harper, Mauritian Prime Minister Navinchandra Ramgoolam, New Zealand Prime Minister John Key, French President Nicolas Sarkozy, and Commonwealth Secretary-General Kamalesh Sharma.	
40	Russia	Moscow	6–8 December	Attended the Annual India-Russia summit meeting. Met with President Dmitry Medvedev and witnessed the signing of joint documents. Also met Prime Minister Vladimir Putin and attended India-Russia CEOs meet.	
41	United Nations; Denmark	Copenhagen	17–18 December	Attended the 2009 United Nations Climate Change Conference (COP15) and addressed the plenary session of the heads of state and government. Also met Chinese Premier Wen Jiabao on the sidelines.	

== 2010 ==
	Country	Areas visited	Date(s)	Details	Images
42	Saudi Arabia	Riyadh	27 February– 1 March	Met with King Abdullah bin Abdulaziz Al Saud, Custodian of the Two Holy Mosques at Al Yamamah Palace and received the First Class of the Order of King Abdulaziz. Met Foreign Minister Prince Saud bin Faisal Al Saud, Petroleum Minister Ali Al-Naimi, Commerce & Industry Minister Abdulla Zain Ali Reza. Addressed the Majlis ash-Shura and received an honorary doctorate from King Saud University.	
43	United States	Washington, D.C.	11–13 April	Attended the 1st Nuclear Security Summit. Met with host President Barack Obama and other participating leaders including Kazakh President Nursultan Nazarbayev, German Chancellor Angela Merkel, French President Nicolas Sarkozy, Moroccan Prime Minister Abbas El Fassi.	
43	Brazil	Brasília	14–17 April	Attended the 2nd BRIC summit and 4th IBSA summit. Participated in the BRIC plenary session and special IBSA Summit. Met with President Luiz Inácio Lula da Silva and other BRIC leaders and the President of South Africa Jacob Zuma. Also met Brazilian Defence Minister Nelson Jobim.	
44	Bhutan	Thimphu	28–30 April	Attended 16th SAARC Summit. Addressed SAARC heads of state and government plenary and retreat. Met and held talks with host Prime Minister Jigme Thinley and attended banquet hosted by him. Called on King Jigme Khesar Namgyel Wangchuck and met other participating SAARC leaders.	
45	Canada	Toronto	25–29 June	Attended the 4th G20 summit and participated in plenary session. Met other participating G20 leaders including British Prime Minister David Cameron, US President Barack Obama, etc. Met with Prime Minister Stephen Harper and witnessed signing of several documents and attended banquet hosted by him. Also visited Air India 82 Memorial and met families of victims.	
46	Japan	Tokyo	24–25 October	Attended Annual Indo-Japan Summit. Met with Prime Minister Naoto Kan and witnessed signing of documents and attended luncheon hosted by him. Called on Emperor Akihito and Empress Michiko at Imperial Palace. Also met leaders of the Friendship Association, industrial leaders and other government officials.	
46	Malaysia	Kuala Lumpur	26–27 October	Met with Prime Minister Najib Razak at Perdana Putra and witnessed signing of documents. Participated in the launch of Little India, Brickfields. Called on Yang di-Pertuan Agong Sultan Mizan Zainal Abidin and Raja Permaisuri Agong Sultanah Nur Zahirah at Istana Negara Palace.	
46	Vietnam	Hanoi	28–30 October	Attended the ASEAN Summit, 5th East Asia Summit and Annual India-ASEAN Summit. Met with Prime Minister Nguyễn Tấn Dũng and also met other participating leaders including US Secretary of State Hillary Clinton, Australian Prime Minister Julia Gillard, Singaporean Prime Minister Lee Hsien Loong, etc. Met with President Nguyễn Minh Triết along with other participating leaders.	
47	South Korea	Seoul	10–12 November	Attended the 5th G20 summit. Participated in plenary meeting and met President Lee Myung-bak. Held multilateral talks with other participating leaders including Australian Prime Minister Julia Gillard, Canadian Prime Minister Stephen Harper, British Prime Minister David Cameron, etc.	
48	European Union; Belgium	Brussels	9–10 December	Attended 11th India-EU Summit. Met and addressed joint press conference with President of the European Council Herman Van Rompuy and President of the European Commission José Manuel Barroso. Also met Prime Minister of Belgium Yves Leterme and attended a dinner hosted by him.	
48	Germany	Berlin	11–12 December	Attended second round of intergovernmental consultations with Germany and met with host Federal Chancellor Angela Merkel. Also called on President Christian Wulff.	

== 2011 ==
	Country	Areas visited	Date(s)	Details	Images
49	China	Beijing	12–14 April	Attended the 3rd BRICS summit. Met with host President Hu Jintao and addressed the BRICS plenary. Also held bilateral talks with other BRICS leaders.	
49	Kazakhstan	Astana	15–16 April	Met and held delegation-level talks with President Nursultan Nazarbayev. Visited and paid homage at the Monument of Defenders of Motherland. Met Prime Minister Karim Massimov and witnessed signing of pacts and documents.	
50	Afghanistan	Kabul	12–13 May	Met with President Hamid Karzai and received ceremonial welcome at Kabul International Airport. Addressed special session of the Parliament of Afghanistan and met other important leaders including Vice presidents Mohammad Fahim and Karim Khalili, President of the High Council Burhanuddin Rabbani.	
51	African Union; Ethiopia	Addis Ababa	23–25 May	Attended 2nd India–Africa Forum Summit. Met with Prime Minister Meles Zenawi and witnessed signing of various documents. Met leaders of other African countries including Swazi King Mswati III, Senegalese President Abdoulaye Wade, Malawian President Bingu wa Mutharika. Also addressed special session of the Federal Parliamentary Assembly.	
51	Tanzania	Dodoma	26–28 May	Met with President Jakaya Kikwete and witnessed signing of several documents. Jointly inaugurated the India-Tanzania Centre in Information and Communication Technology.	
52	Bangladesh	Dhaka	6–7 September	Accorded ceremonial welcome at Hazrat Shahjalal International Airport. Met with Prime Minister Sheikh Hasina and witnessed signing of documents and attended banquet hosted by her in his honour. Visited National Martyrs' Memorial and Bangabandhu Memorial Museum. Met President Zillur Rahman and former President Hussain Muhammad Ershad, former Prime Minister Khaleda Zia and Foreign Minister Dipu Moni. Also addressed the Dhaka University.	
53	United Nations; United States	New York City, Washington, D.C.	21–27 September	Addressed the 66th session of the United Nations General Assembly. Met with leaders of other UN member countries including Japanese Prime Minister Yoshihiko Noda, Sri Lankan President Mahinda Rajapaksa, Nepalese Prime Minister Baburam Bhattarai, South Sudanese president Salva Kiir.	
54	South Africa	Pretoria	17–19 October	Attended the 5th IBSA Summit. Held trilateral and bilateral talks with President Jacob Zuma and Brazilian President Dilma Rousseff.	
55	France	Cannes	2–5 November	Attended the 6th G20 Summit. Met with President Nicolas Sarkozy and held multilateral talks with other participating leaders including leaders of BRICS countries, Mexican President Felipe Calderón, Australian Prime Minister Julia Gillard, Singaporean Prime Minister Lee Hsien Loong.	
56	Maldives	Addu City, Malé	9–12 November	Attended the 17th SAARC summit. Addressed SAARC plenary and met other SAARC leaders including Pakistani Prime Minister Yousuf Raza Gillani and Afghan President Hamid Karzai. Travelled to Malé for official visit, met with President Mohamed Nasheed and signed several documents and attended a state banquet. Also met Vice President Mohamed Waheed Hassan and also addressed the People's Majlis becoming the first-ever foreign leader to do so.	
57	Indonesia	Nusa Dua	17–19 November	Attended the ASEAN Summit, 6th East Asia Summit and the Annual India-ASEAN Summit. Met with President Susilo Bambang Yudhoyono and other participating leaders including US President Barack Obama, Chinese Premier Wen Jiabao, Cambodian Prime Minister Hun Sen.	
57	Singapore	Singapore	20 November	Met with Prime Minister Lee Hsien Loong at The Istana and attended banquet hosted by him. Called on President Tony Tan and met Emeritus Senior Minister Goh Chok Tong and former Minister Mentor Lee Kuan Yew. Inaugurated bust and marker of Jawaharlal Nehru at the Asian Civilisations Museum.	
58	Russia	Moscow	15–17 December	Attended Annual India-Russia summit. Met with President Dmitry Medvedev and First Lady Svetlana Medvedeva and attended banquet hosted by the presidential couple at Grand Kremlin Palace. Also met Prime Minister Vladimir Putin.	

== 2012 ==
	Country	Areas visited	Date(s)	Details	Images
59	South Korea	Seoul	23–27 March	Attended 2012 Nuclear Security Summit. Met with President Lee Myung-bak and attended banquet hosted by him. Visited Seoul National Cemetery and received guard of honour at Blue House. Held multilateral talks with several other participating leaders including Norwegian Prime Minister Jens Stoltenberg, Italian prime minister Mario Monti, Turkish Prime Minister Recep Tayyip Erdogan.	
60	Myanmar	Naypyidaw	27–29 May	Met with President Thein Sein and witnessed signing of various pacts and treaties between both nations. Attended banquet hosted by him. Also met with Nobel laureate Aung San Suu Kyi and paid a visit to the Mazar of last Mughal Emperor Bahadur Shah Zafar. First prime ministerial visit to Myanmar in 25 years.	
61	Mexico	Los Cabos	16–18 June	Attended 7th G20 summit. Met with host President Felipe Calderón. Also held multilateral talks with leaders of the BRICS countries and the French President François Hollande on the sidelines.	
61	United Nations; Brazil	Brasília	19–23 June	Attended United Nations Conference on Sustainable Development (Rio+20 Summit). Met with President Dilma Rousseff and participated in summit dialogue. Also met leaders of other countries include Sri Lankan President Mahinda Rajapaksa, Nepalese Prime Minister Baburam Bhattarai and Chinese Premier Wen Jiabao.	
62	Iran	Tehran	28–31 August	Attended 16th NAM Summit. Met with President Mahmoud Ahmadinejad and Supreme Leader Ali Khamenei. Addressed Non-Aligned Movement Plenary and also met leaders of other NAM countries including Bangladeshi Prime Minister Sheikh Hasina, Afghan President Hamid Karzai and Pakistani President Asif Ali Zardari.	
63	Cambodia	Phnom Penh	18–20 November	Attended ASEAN summit, 7th East India summit and Annual India-ASEAN summit. Met with Prime Minister Samdech Hun Sen and King Norodom Sihamoni and Queen Mother Norodom Monineath at Royal Palace and laid wreath on the mortal remains of late King Father Norodom Sihanouk. Held multilateral talks with other participating leaders including Filipino President Benigno Aquino III, Chinese Premier Wen Jiabao, Thai Prime Minister Yingluck Shinawatra.	

== 2013 ==
	Country	Areas visited	Date(s)	Details	Images
64	South Africa	Durban	25–29 March	Attended 5th BRICS summit. Met with President Jacob Zuma and held multilateral talks with other leaders of BRICS countries.	
65	Germany	Berlin	10–12 April	Attended second round of intergovernmental consultations with Germany. Met with Federal Chancellor Angela Merkel at German Chancellery and President Joachim Gauck. Attended closing ceremony of "Days of India 2012-2013". Visit marked to commemorate 60th anniversary of establishment of diplomatic relations with Germany.	
66	Japan	Tokyo	27–29 May	Attended Annual India-Japan summit. Met with Prime Minister Shinzo Abe and attended business luncheon. Also addressed the Japan-India Parliamentary Friendship League and International Friendship Exchange Council and presented Padma Shri award on Professor Noboru Karashima. Met Emperor Akihito and Empress Michiko at Imperial Palace, Tokyo and other senior Japanese cabinet ministers including Foreign Minister Fumio Kishida, Trade and Industry Minister Toshimitsu Motegi.	
66	Thailand	Bangkok	30–31 May	Met with Prime Minister Yingluck Shinawatra. Attended banquet hosted by her.	
67	Russia	Saint Petersburg	4–7 September	Attended 8th G20 summit. Met with President Vladimir Putin. Held multilateral talks with leaders of BRICS countries and other leaders including Argentine President Cristina Fernández de Kirchner and Japanese Deputy Prime Minister Tarō Asō.	
68	United Nations; United States	New York City, Washington, D.C.	25 September–1 October	Addressed the 68th session of the United Nations General Assembly. Met with US President Barack Obama and attended a luncheon at White House and met leaders of other UN member countries including Bangladesh Prime Minister Sheikh Hasina, Pakistan Prime Minister Nawaz Sharif, Mauritius Prime Minister Navinchandra Ramgoolam.	
69	Brunei	Bandar Seri Begawan	9–10 October	Attended ASEAN summit and 8th East Asia Summit. First ever prime ministerial visit to Brunei from India. Met with Sultan Hassanal Bolkiah and attended gala dinner. Also met Japanese Prime Minister Shinzo Abe and Australian Prime Minister Tony Abbott on the sidelines of the summit.	
69	Indonesia	Jakarta	10–12 October	Met with President Susilo Bambang Yudhoyono. Laid wreath at Kalibata Heroes' Cemetery and attended ceremonial welcome at Istana Merdeka.	
70	Russia	Moscow	20–22 October	Attended 14th Annual India-Russia Summit. Met with President Vladimir Putin. Received honorary doctorate from the Moscow State Institute of International Relations.	
70	China	Beijing	22–24 October	Met with Premier Li Keqiang. Accorded ceremonial welcome at Great Hall of the People and attended banquet. Also met with President Xi Jinping, former Premier Wen Jiabao, Executive Vice President of the Central Party School He Yiting.	

== 2014 ==
	Country	Areas visited	Date(s)	Details	Images
71	Myanmar	Naypyidaw	3–4 March	Attended 3rd BIMSTEC Summit. Met with President Thein Sein and held multilateral talks with other participating BIMSTEC leaders. Also met Nobel laureate and National League for Democracy leader Aung San Suu Kyi. Final overseas trip as prime minister.	

== Multilateral meetings ==
Group	Year										
Group	2004	2005	2006	2007	2008	2009	2010	2011	2012	2013	2014
ASEM	8–9 October, (Note: India was not a full member.) (Vietnam) Hanoi		10–11 September, (Finland) Helsinki		24–25 October, (China) Beijing		4–5 October, (Note: Vice President Mohammad Hamid Ansari attended in the Prime Minister's place.) (Belgium) Brussels		5–6 November, (Note: Minister of External Affairs Salman Khurshid attended in the Prime Minister's place.) (Laos) Vientaine		Office left
BIMSTEC	31 July, (Thailand) Bangkok				13 November, (Note: These summits were hosted by India.) (India) New Delhi						4 March, (Myanmar) Naypyidaw
BRICS						16 June, (Russia) Yekaterinburg	16 April, (Brazil) Brasília	14 April, (China) Beijing	29 March, (India) New Delhi	26–27 March, (South Africa) Durban	Office left
CHOGM		25–27 November, (Note: Minister of Commerce and Industry Kamal Nath attended in the Prime Minister's place.) (Malta) Valletta		23–25 November, (Uganda) Kampala		27–29 November, (Trinidad and Tobago) Port of Spain		28–30 October, (Australia) Perth		15–17 November, (Sri Lanka) Colombo	
EAS-ASEAN	29–30 November, (Laos) Vientiane	12–14 December, (Malaysia) Kuala Lumpur		13–14 January, (Philippines) Mandaue		23–25 October, (Thailand) Cha-am, Hua Hin	28–30 October, (Vietnam) Hanoi	17–19 November, (Indonesia) Nusa Dua	18–20 November, (Cambodia) Phnom Penh	9–10 October, (Brunei) Bandar Seri Begawan	Office left
EAS-ASEAN	29–30 November, (Laos) Vientiane	12–14 December, (Malaysia) Kuala Lumpur		20–21 November, Singapore		23–25 October, (Thailand) Cha-am, Hua Hin	28–30 October, (Vietnam) Hanoi	17–19 November, (Indonesia) Nusa Dua	20–21 December, (India) New Delhi	9–10 October, (Brunei) Bandar Seri Begawan	Office left
G-8	8–10 June, (United States) Sea Island	6–8 July, (United Kingdom) Auchterarder	15–17 July, (Russia) Saint Petersburg	6–8 June, (Germany) Heiligendamm	7–9 July, (Japan) Tōyako	8–10 July, (Italy) L'Aquila	25–26 June, (Canada) Huntsville	26–27 May, (France) Deauville	18–19 May, (United States) Camp David	17–18 June, (United Kingdom) Enniskillen	Office left
G-20					14–15 November, (United States) Washington, D.C.	2 April, (United Kingdom) London	26–27 June, (Canada) Toronto	3–4 November, (France) Cannes	18–19 June, (Mexico) Los Cabos	5–6 September, (Russia) Saint Petersburg	Office left
G-20					14–15 November, (United States) Washington, D.C.	24–25 September, (United States) Pittsburgh	11–12 November, (South Korea) Seoul	3–4 November, (France) Cannes	18–19 June, (Mexico) Los Cabos	5–6 September, (Russia) Saint Petersburg	Office left
IAFS					8–9 April, (India) New Delhi			24–25 May, (African Union) (Ethiopia) Addis Ababa			
IBSA			13–14 September, (Brazil) Brasília	17–18 October, (South Africa) Johannesburg	15 October, (India) New Delhi	15 April, (Brazil) Brasília	18 October, (South Africa) Pretoria		~~16 May,~~; ~~(India) New Delhi~~ Cancelled		
IEUS	8 November, (European Union) (Netherlands) The Hague	7 September, (India) New Delhi	13 October, (European Union) (Finland) Helsinki	30 November, (India) New Delhi	29 September, (European Union) (France) Marseille	6 November, (India) New Delhi	10 December, (European Union) (Belgium) Brussels		10 February, (India) New Delhi		
NAM			15–16 September, (Cuba) Havana			11–16 July, (Egypt) Sharm el-Sheikh			26–31 August, (Iran) Tehran		
NSS							12–13 April, (United States) Washington, D.C.		26–27 March, (South Korea) Seoul		24–25 March, (Netherlands) The Hague
SAARC	Office not entered	12–13 November, (Bangladesh) Dhaka		3–4 April, (India) New Delhi	1–3 August, (Sri Lanka) Colombo		28–29 April, (Bhutan) Thimphu	10–11 November, (Maldives) Addu City			Office left
SCO	17 June, (Uzbekistan) Tashkent	5 July, (Note: Minister of External Affairs Natwar Singh attended in the Prime Minister's place.) (Kazakhstan) Astana	15 June, (Note: Minister of Petroleum and Natural Gas Murli Deora attended in the Prime Minister's place.) (China) Shanghai	16 August, (Kyrgyzstan) Bishkek	28 August, (Tajikistan) Dushanbe	15–16 June, (Russia) Yekatarinberg	10–11 June, (Note: Minister of External Affairs S. M. Krishna attended in the Prime Minister's place.) (Uzbekistan) Tashkent	14–15 June, (Kazakhstan) Astana	6–7 June, (China) Beijing	13 September, (Kyrgyzstan) Bishkek	Office left
UNCCC	6–17 December, (United Nations) (Argentina) Buenos Aires	28 November– 9 December, (United Nations) (Canada) Montreal	6–17 November, (United Nations) (Kenya) Nairobi	3–15 December, (United Nations) (Indonesia) Nusa Dua	1–12 December, (United Nations) (Poland) Poznań	7–18 December, (United Nations) (Denmark) Copenhagen	29 November– 10 December, (United Nations) (Mexico) Cancún	28 November– 11 December, (United Nations) (South Africa) Durban	26 November– 8 December, (United Nations) (Qatar) Doha	11–23 November, (United Nations) (Poland) Warsaw	Office left
UNGA	23 September, (United Nations) New York City	15 September, (United Nations) New York City	27 September, (Note: Minister of External Affairs Pranab Mukherjee attended in the Prime Minister's place.) (United Nations) New York City	1 October, (United Nations) New York City	27 September, (United Nations) New York City	26 September, (United Nations) New York City	29 September, (United Nations) New York City	24 September, (United Nations) New York City	1 October, (United Nations) New York City	28 September, (United Nations) New York City	Office left
Others		AAS; 22–24 April, (Indonesia) Jakarta							UNCSD; 19–22 June, (United Nations) (Brazil) Rio de Janeiro		
Did not attend No event held

== See also ==
- List of international trips made by prime ministers of India
- List of international presidential trips made by Pratibha Patil
- List of international trips made by Salman Khurshid as Minister of External Affairs of India
- History of Indian foreign relations
