= IBSA =

IBSA may refer to:

- IBSA Dialogue Forum, an international economic organization
- Image-based sexual abuse, a more formal term for revenge porn
- International Bible Students Association, an organization of the Jehovah's Witnesses in the United Kingdom
- International Blind Sports Federation, the governing body for blind sports
- Interstate Batteries, an American battery manufacturer
