= World Trade Organization Ministerial Conference of 2003 =

Trade conference in Cancún, 2003

Fifth Ministerial Conference of the World Trade Organization

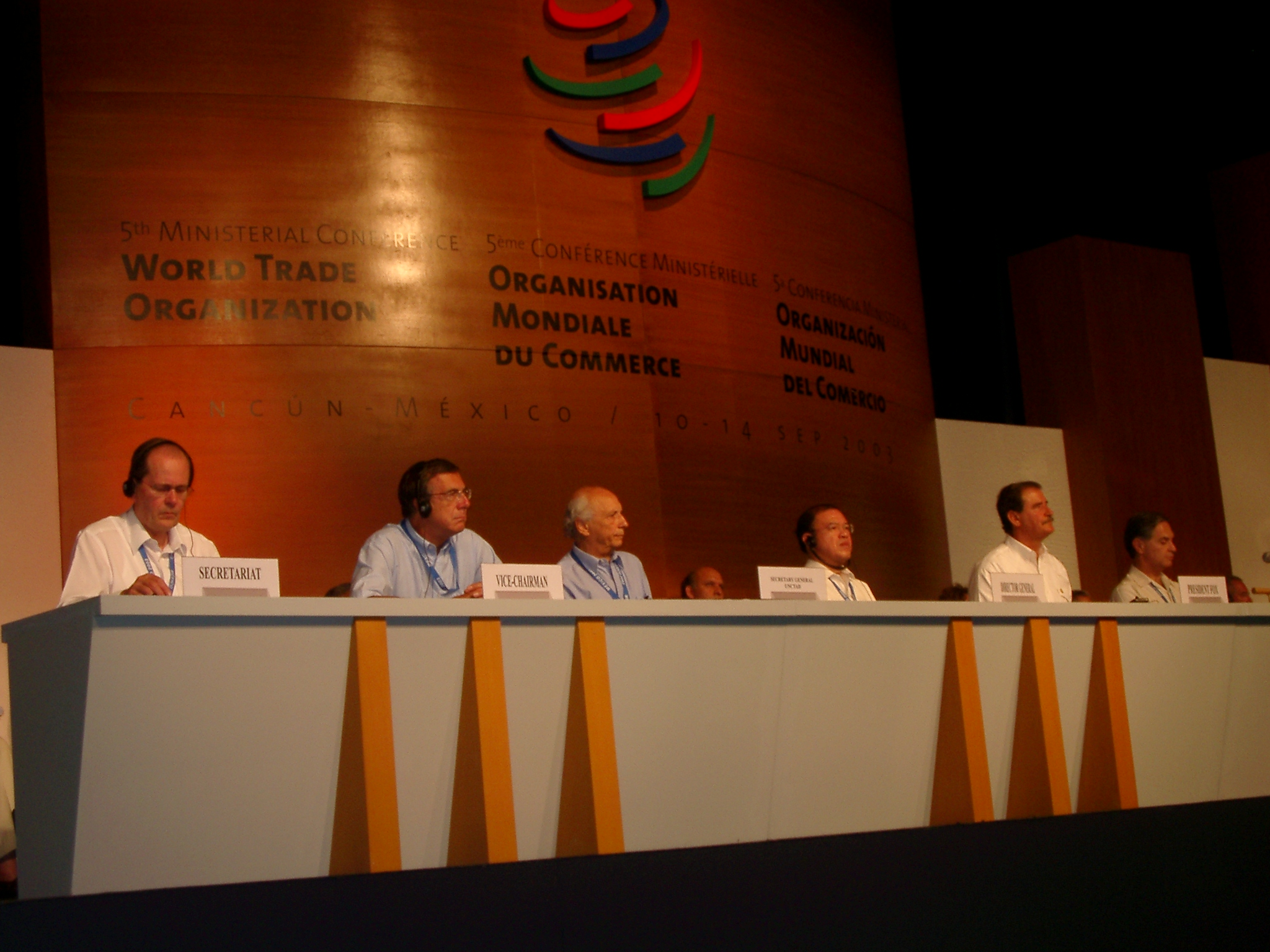
- Dais of speakers at the Cancún WTO Ministerial Conference
- Country: Cancún, Mexico
- Previous event: Fourth Ministerial Conference of the World Trade Organization
- Next event: Sixth Ministerial Conference of the World Trade Organization
- Participants: 146 member countries

At the World Trade Organization Ministerial Conference of 2003, trade ministers from 146 members of the World Trade Organization (WTO), representing 93 percent of global commerce, convened in Cancún, Mexico, in September 2003. The conference (the fifth WTO Ministerial Conference, or MC5) was held at the Cancún Centro de Convenciones, Cancún. The goal of this meeting was to set a direction for nations within the WTO to negotiate agreements on agriculture, non-agricultural market access, services, and special treatment for developing countries. The negotiations were supposed to be completed by January 1, 2005.

Although the agreements had a set date to come to terms, the Cancun Ministerial Conference ended up failing in its mission and did not come to any firm decisions to fix the problems it sought to address. Participants failed to make global trade negotiations concrete and foundered at that time, so the next steps were uncertain. However, attempts were made afterwards to learn from this failure. Within the committee, there exists a hierarchy within the World Trade Organization. It is made up of trade Administrators that come from all the different sectors of the WTO.

== Background ==
The General Agreement on Tariffs and Trade (GATT) was created in 1947 after World War II in an attempt to encourage and regulate a global Free Trade market. This agreement between countries later evolved into the World Trade Organization following the Uruguay Round of 1994, With the goals of lowering tariffs and taxes worldwide, the committee is designed to voice the opinions and needs of all countries big and small. Of the larger topics that is constantly addressed is an Open Market on crops and food. This committee has helped Developing Countries enter a new era of a worldwide sharing and trading of goods. In Doha, Qatar, in 2001, the World Trade Organization met to discuss the potential of a new focus upon the development and progression of developing countries concerning their free, open markets on top of abolishing certain lingering agreements. These agreements included tariffs, taxes, and agreements concerning trade of goods (specifically food such as grain, corn, and tobacco).

== Priorities ==
During the World Trade Organization meeting in Cancun in 2003, held from 10 to 14 September 2003, there were numerous topics that drew much attention. The WTO saw the gathering as "a stock-taking meeting", where it was hoped that participants would be able to agree on how to take forward important issues. However, from the outset, there was a large rift between the developed and less developed countries on how to deal with these. These topics were as follows: nonagricultural market availability and access, agricultural reformation, the addition of new item subjects for World Trade Organization commitments, services (like telecommunications and financial services) and specialized treatment for developing countries. The developing countries heavily criticised the advantage that agricultural corporations from developed nations have, as agriculture subsidizes are common, and the unfair competition it would create on developing nations if they would join a free-market agreement. Of all these topics, there were no definite decisions or outcomes that came from the five-day meeting. It did however progress the ideas forward for the next conference. Many found the ideas were just the start and would provide a good push when the next conference came around.

== Problems with the meeting ==
The gathering collapsed as participants divided into two camps: the developed and the developing nations. The developing nations withdrew from the talks, raising concerns about a European Union proposal aiming to position investment and antitrust issues as the main agenda matters. The United States Government Accountability Office (GAO), analysing the divisions which arose at the conference and their impact on the outcome, found that there were multiple factors explaining why the meeting between all the countries ended with no agreements globally on any of the issues brought forward. One pressing issue that angered the larger developed nations was the unwillingness of many developing countries to completely open their markets for free trade. Without this compromise, the United States and the European nations felt no inclination to cut down subsidies and help these developing countries economically without a fair agreement on trade. This was a hard standoff, as both sides of the argument wanted to increase global trade with a more open market, but neither was willing to settle for less than what they wanted.

Other large problems found by the GAO included too much on the agenda for the amount of time they had, a lack of clear organization for the debates and lectures, and too many countries trying to participate while constantly realigning themselves solely to seek a better outcome for their countries. No one had the intentions to try and strike deals with each other as a whole, rather there were many back door deals throughout the conference as countries tried to swindle around everyone. Since 1986, the membership of this conference has risen by 90 participants to a total of 146 members. This has caused a large dilemma of satisfying all countries' needs. As many of the earlier participants have already satisfied many of the open trade requirements in their countries, many of the newer countries are reluctant from abiding to the tariff abolition and free trade encouragement. One of the pressing reasons for this overwhelming movement was because this Cancun World Trade Organization conference was the first time the world had met since they had created the Doha Development Agenda. This agenda is designed to lower trading barriers and encourage a global trade on a much larger scale, with more of the smaller countries. With over two years since its creation, many countries had so many pressing issues they had hoped to bring forward into the conference, yet there was too little time for all of them to be considered.

Nevertheless, the conference has also been described as a "watershed" in international trade relationships. John Tsang, then Hong Kong's Secretary for Commerce, Industry and Technology and chair of the Sixth Ministerial Conference of the World Trade Organization, MC6, said that following Cancún, "negotiations could no longer be dictated by the US and the EU, the two Big Beasts in the WTO jungle".

== See also ==
- Doha Development Round
- World Trade Organization Ministerial Conference of 2005
