= Non-Agricultural Market Access =

The Non-Agricultural Market Access (NAMA) negotiations of the World Trade Organization are based on the Doha Declaration of 2001 that calls for a reduction or elimination in tariffs, particularly on exportable goods of interest to developing countries. NAMA covers manufacturing products, fuel and mining products, fish and fish products, and forestry products. These products are not covered by the Agreement on Agriculture or the negotiations on services. The WTO considers the NAMA negotiations important because NAMA products account for almost 90% of the world's merchandise exports.

== History ==
NAMA negotiations formally began in January 2002 after the Negotiating Group on Market Access (NGMA) was created. Pierre-Louis Girard, Chairman of the NGMA, made the first proposal in 2003 before the Cancun Ministerial about the modalities regarding how to take the process forward. However, Girard's proposal faced severe opposition from the developed members because he proposed a smaller tariff cut than the one that the developed member countries had been advocating. However, by the time the Cancun Ministerial was held in 2003, the second text on NAMA was opposed by the developing countries, especially by the G90 and African, Caribbean and Pacific Group of States countries, for moving away from the first NAMA draft.

The deadlock on NAMA negotiations was broken in July 2004, which was the first agreement amongst the countries after the collapse of Cancun. The July 2004 agreement also laid the framework for establishing future modalities.

== Main Issues ==
Tariff Reduction: methodology for reducing tariffs is at the core of the negotiations over NAMA. However, here too the developed and developing countries are divided over the extent to which tariff reductions will be carried out. At the heart of the debate is the reconciliation of the process of tariff reduction and the need to use tariffs as a policy tool, primarily by developing countries interested in protecting emerging industries for developmental purposes.

A tariff binding is a ceiling above which a member country cannot apply a tariff, thus representing the maximum tariff than can be applied by a member.

The NAMA negotiators have opted in favour of a formula approach to tariff reductions rather than a linear approach. The Swiss formula, which has been propounded by the developed countries such as the US, the EC countries, Norway, and Japan, proposes to cut tariffs steeply without taking account of the existing tariff profile of a country.

The modified Swiss formula, on the other hand, takes into account the tariff profile of the countries while carrying out tariff reductions. This approach is supported by the developing countries.

== Lobby Groups ==
=== NAMA-11 ===
A group of 11 developing countries, called NAMA-11, are working toward strengthening NAMA. The group has two main objectives: supporting flexibilities for developing countries and balance between NAMA and other areas under negotiation. Member countries of NAMA-11 are Argentina, Bolivarian Republic of Venezuela, Brazil, Egypt, India, Indonesia, Namibia, Philippines, South Africa, Pakistan and Tunisia.

== See also ==
- IBSA Dialogue Forum
- World Trade Organization
