= List of international trips made by Salman Khurshid as Minister of External Affairs of India =

This is a list of international trips undertaken by Salman Khurshid (in office 2012–2014) while serving as the Minister of External Affairs of India. The list includes both individual visits undertaken by him and visits in which he accompanied the Prime Minister or some other dignitary on their overseas visits. The list includes only foreign travel which he made during his tenure in the position.

== Summary of international trips ==
In his two-year tenure as the Minister of External Affairs, Salman Khurshid made 38 international trips, visiting 43 countries.

Map of international trips made by Salman Khurshid as Minister of External Affairs.

One visit
Two visits
India

Minister of External Affairs Salman Khurshid's visits by country
Number of visits	Country
1 visit (38)	Afghanistan, Argentina, Australia, Bahrain, Bangladesh, Belgium, Bhutan, Brazil, Brunei, Canada, Chile, China, France, Hungary, Indonesia, Iran, Iraq, Japan, Kazakhstan, Kyrgyzstan, Maldives, Morocco, Myanmar, Nepal, Netherlands, Norway, Philippines, Saudi Arabia, Sudan, Switzerland, Thailand, Tunisia, Turkey, Uganda, United Arab Emirates, United Kingdom, United States, Uzbekistan
2 visits (5)	Germany, Laos, Russia, Singapore, Sri Lanka

== 2012 ==
	Country	Date(s)	Details	Images
1	Laos	5–6 November	Attended the 9th Asia–Europe Meeting Summit. Met with Prime Minister Thongsing Thammavong, Deputy Prime Minister and Foreign Minister Thongloun Sisoulith, and other visiting leaders.	
2	Myanmar	14–16 December	Met with President Thein Sein, Foreign Minister Wunna Maung Lwin, and National League for Democracy leader Aung San Suu Kyi. Inaugurated the International Conference on Buddhist Cultural Heritage.	

== 2013 ==
	Country	Date(s)	Details	Images
3	France	10–11 January	Met with President François Hollande and Foreign Minister Laurent Fabius.	
4	Bhutan	14–15 January	Met with King Jigme Khesar Namgyel Wangchuck, Fourth King Jigme Singye Wangchuck, Prime Minister Jigme Thinley, and Economic Affairs and Foreign Affairs Minister Khandu Wangchuk.	
5	Germany	28–29 January	Met with Chancellor Angela Merkel, Foreign Minister Guido Westerwelle, Education and Research Minister Annette Schavan, and Berlin Mayor Klaus Wowereit.	
5	European Union; Belgium	30–31 January	Met with Deputy Prime Minister and Foreign Minister Didier Reynders and Vice President of the European Commission and European Union High Representative for Foreign Affairs and Security Policy Catherine Ashton.	
6	Chile	5–7 February	Met with Interior and Public Security Minister Andrés Chadwick, Foreign Minister Alfredo Moreno Charme, and Deputy Foreign Minister Alfonso Silva Navarro.	
6	Argentina	7–8 February	Met with President Cristina Fernández de Kirchner.	
7	Bangladesh	16–17 February	Attended the 2nd India-Bangladesh Joint Consultative Commission Meeting. Met with Prime Minister Sheikh Hasina, Foreign Minister Dipu Moni, and Opposition LeaderKhaleda Zia.	
8	United Arab Emirates	13 March	Met with Crown Prince of Abu Dhabi Sheikh Mohamed bin Zayed Al Nahyan and Foreign Minister Sheikh Abdullah bin Zayed Al Nahyan.	
9	Japan	26–27 March	Attended the 7th Annual India-Japan Strategic Dialogue. Met with Prime Minister Shinzo Abe and Foreign Minister Fumio Kishida.	
10	Germany	10–12 April	Accompanied Prime Minister Manmohan Singh to the Second India-Germany Intergovernmental Consultations. Met with Foreign Minister Guido Westerwelle.	
11	Uganda	17–20 April	Met with Foreign Minister Sam Kutesa.	
12	Kazakhstan	26–28 April	Attended the Heart of Asia - Istanbul Process Ministerial Conference. Met with President Nursultan Nazarbayev, Foreign Minister Erlan Idrissov and Turkish Foreign Minister Ahmet Davutoğlu.	
12	Russia	28–30 April	Met with Deputy Prime Minister Dmitry Rogozin.	
13	Iran	3–5 May	Attended the 17th India-Iran Joint Commission Meeting. Met with President Mahmoud Ahmadinejad, Foreign Minister Ali Akbar Salehi, and Speaker of the Islamic Consultative Assembly Ali Larijani.	
14	China	9–10 May	Met with Premier of the State Council Li Keqiang, State Councilor Yang Jiechi, and Foreign Minister Wang Yi.	
15	Saudi Arabia	25–26 May	Met with Crown Prince Prince Salman bin Abdulaziz Al Saud and Foreign Minister Prince Saud bin Faisal Al Saud.	
16	Thailand	30–31 May	Accompanied Prime Minister Manmohan Singh.	
17	Norway	11–13 June	Met with Foreign Minister Espen Barth Eide. Visited Himadri Research Station.	
18	Iraq	19–20 June	Met with Prime Minister Nouri al-Maliki, Deputy Prime Minister Hussain al-Shahristani, and Foreign Minister Hoshyar Zebari.	
19	Brunei	1–2 July	Attended the ASEAN–India Ministerial, the 20th ASEAN Regional Forum, and the 3rd East Asia Summit Foreign Ministers Meeting. Met with Foreign Minister Prince Mohamed Bolkiah and other participating foreign ministers.	
19	Singapore	3–4 July	Met with Prime Minister Lee Hsien Loong, Emeritus Senior Minister Goh Chok Tong, Deputy Prime Minister, Coordinating Minister for National Security and Minister for Home Affairs Teo Chee Hean and Foreign Minister K. Shanmugam.	
20	Nepal	9 July	Met with President Ram Baran Yadav, Prime Minister Khil Raj Regmi, and Foreign Minister Madhav Prasad Ghimire.	
21	Hungary	14–16 July	Met with Prime Minister Viktor Orbán and Foreign Minister János Martonyi.	
22	Turkey	23–25 July	Met with President Abdullah Gül, Prime Minister Recep Tayyip Erdoğan, and Foreign Minister Ahmet Davutoğlu.	
23	Laos	8–10 September	Attended the 7th Lao-India Joint Commission Meeting. Met with President Choummaly Sayasone, Prime Minister Thongsing Thammavong, and Deputy Prime Minister and Foreign Minister Thongloun Sisoulith.	
23	Kyrgyzstan	12–13 September	Attended the 13th Shanghai Cooperation Organization Council of Heads of State Summit. Met with President Almazbek Atambayev.	
23	Uzbekistan	14–15 September	Met with Foreign Minister Abdulaziz Kamilov.	
24	Canada	21–23 September	Met with Foreign Minister John Baird, International Trade Minister Ed Fast, Sport Minister of State Bal Gosal, and Parliamentary Secretary Deepak Obhrai.	
24	United Nations; United States	23–28 September	Accompanied Prime Minister Manmohan Singh 68th United Nations General Assembly session. Met with several participating leaders.	
25	Russia	2–3 October	Met with Deputy Prime Minister Dmitry Rogozin and Foreign Minister Sergey Lavrov.	
26	Sri Lanka	7–8 October	Met with President Mahinda Rajapaksa, Foreign Minister G. L. Peiris, and Economic Development Minister Basil Rajapaksa.	
27	Indonesia	10–12 October	Accompanied Prime Minister Manmohan Singh.	
28	Brazil	14–17 October	Attended the India-Brazil Joint Commission Meeting. Met with Foreign Minister Luiz Alberto Figueiredo.	
29	Philippines	21–23 October	Attended the 2nd Philippines-India Joint Commission Meeting. Met with Vice President Jejomar Binay and Foreign Secretary Albert del Rosario.	
29	Singapore	23–24 October	Attended the 3rd Joint Ministerial Committee Meeting. Met with President Tony Tan, Defence Minister Ng Eng Hen and Foreign Minister K. Shanmugam.	
30	Australia	30 October–1 November	Attended the Indian Ocean Rim Association Council of Ministers Meeting. Met with Foreign Minister Julie Bishop and other visiting ministers.	
31	Sri Lanka	15–17 November	Attended the Commonwealth Heads of Government Meeting.	
32	Bahrain	7–9 December	Attended the 9th edition of the Manama Dialogue.	

== 2014 ==
	Country	Date(s)	Details	Images
33	Switzerland	21–23 January	Attended the International Conference on Syria (Geneva II). Met with several participating foreign ministers.	
34	Morocco	30 January–1 February	Met with King Mohammed VI, Prime Minister Abdelilah Benkirane, and Foreign Minister Salaheddine Mezouar.	
34	Tunisia	2–3 February	Met with President Moncef Marzouki, Prime Minister Mehdi Jomaa, Foreign Minister Mongi Hamdi, and leaders of various political parties.	
34	Sudan	4–5 February	Met with President Omar al-Bashir and Foreign Minister Ali Ahmed Karti. Received honorary doctorate from Alzaiem Alazhari University.	
35	Afghanistan	15–17 February	Met with President Hamid Karzai. Inaugurated the National University of Agricultural Sciences and Technology of Afghanistan.	
36	Maldives	20 February	Attended the 35th SAARC Council of Ministers Inter-Summit session. Met with President Abdulla Yameen and Foreign Minister Dunya Maumoon.	
37	United Kingdom	12–14 March	Attended the Commonwealth Ministerial Action Group Meeting. Met with Foreign Secretary William Hague.	
38	Netherlands	24–25 March	Attended the 3rd Nuclear Security Summit.	

== See also ==
- List of international presidential trips made by Pratibha Patil
- List of international prime ministerial trips made by Manmohan Singh
- History of Indian foreign relations
