= IBSA Dialogue Forum =

Commonly known as IBSA, a three-country alignment

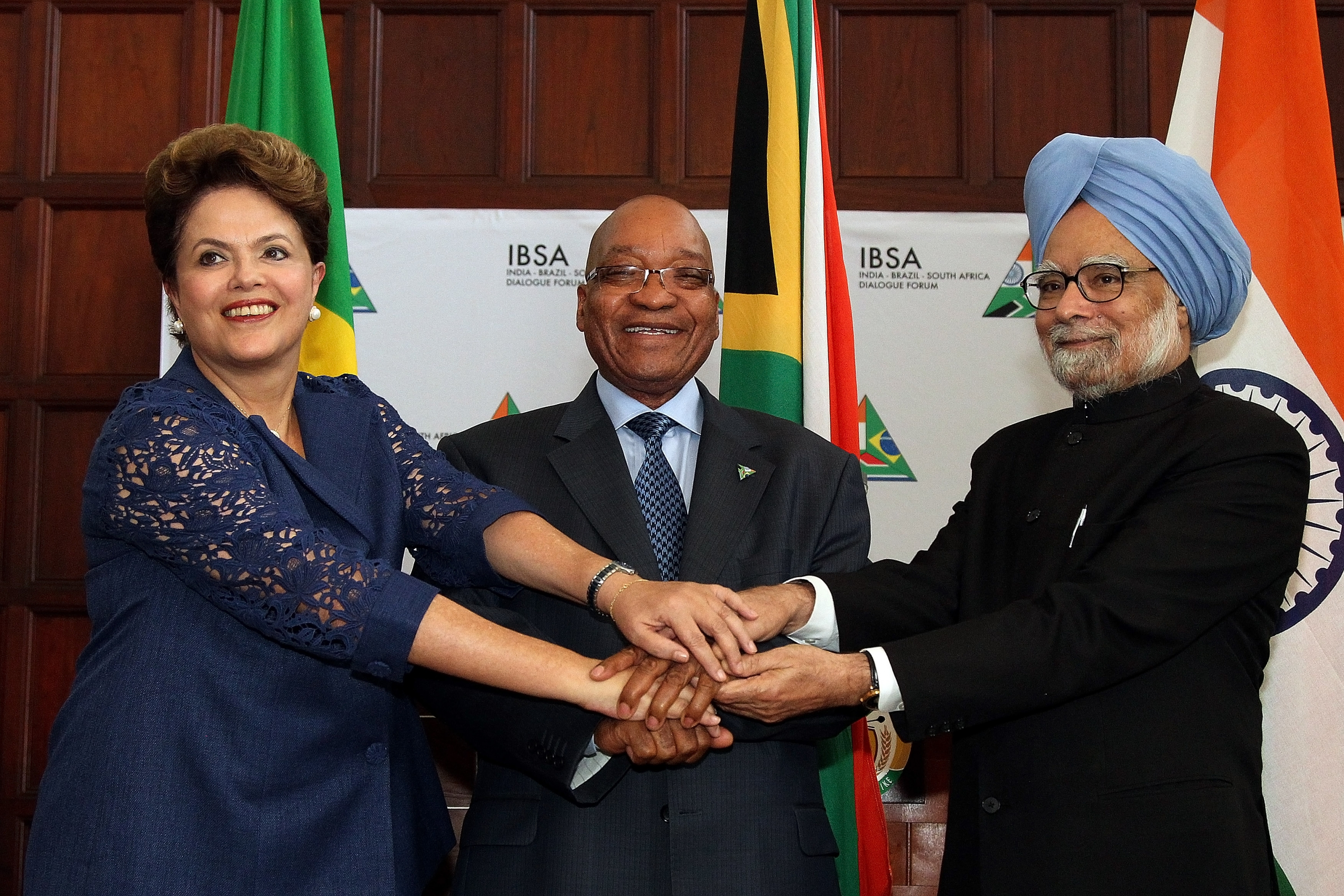
Pretoria (South Africa) – Dilma Rousseff (President of Brazil), Jacob Zuma (President of South Africa), and Manmohan Singh (Prime Minister of India), pose for photo

The IBSA Dialogue Forum (India, Brazil, South Africa) is an international tripartite grouping for promoting international cooperation among these countries. It represents three important poles for galvanizing South–South cooperation and greater understanding between three important continents of the developing world namely, Africa, Asia, and South America. The forum provides the three countries with a platform to engage in discussions for cooperation in the field of agriculture, trade, culture, and defence among others.

The IBSA Dialogue Forum plays an increasingly important role in the foreign policies of India, Brazil, and South Africa. It has become instrumental for promoting ever closer coordination on global issues between three large multicultural and multiracial democracies of Asia, South America and Africa, and contributed to enhancing trilateral India-Brazil-South Africa cooperation in sectoral areas.

== Origin ==
After the co-operation between India (South Asia), Brazil (South America), and South Africa (Africa). The Declaration at the trilateral meeting in Brasília, called for removing protectionist policies and trade distorting practices by improving the multilateral trade system.

On 6 June 2003, Yashwant Sinha (External affairs minister of India), Celso Amorim (Foreign minister of Brazil) and Nkosazana Dlamini-Zuma (Foreign minister of South Africa) met in Brasilia, where the IBSA Dialogue forum was formalized through the adoption of the "Brasilia Declaration". The IBSA Dialogue forum facilitates regular consultations at senior officials level, government (summit) levels as well as amongst academics, intellectuals and other members of the civil society. By some experts, it is also seen as an endeavor to challenge the international system by Pivotal Middle Powers through peaceful convincing, instead of other means.

=== Brasilia Declaration ===
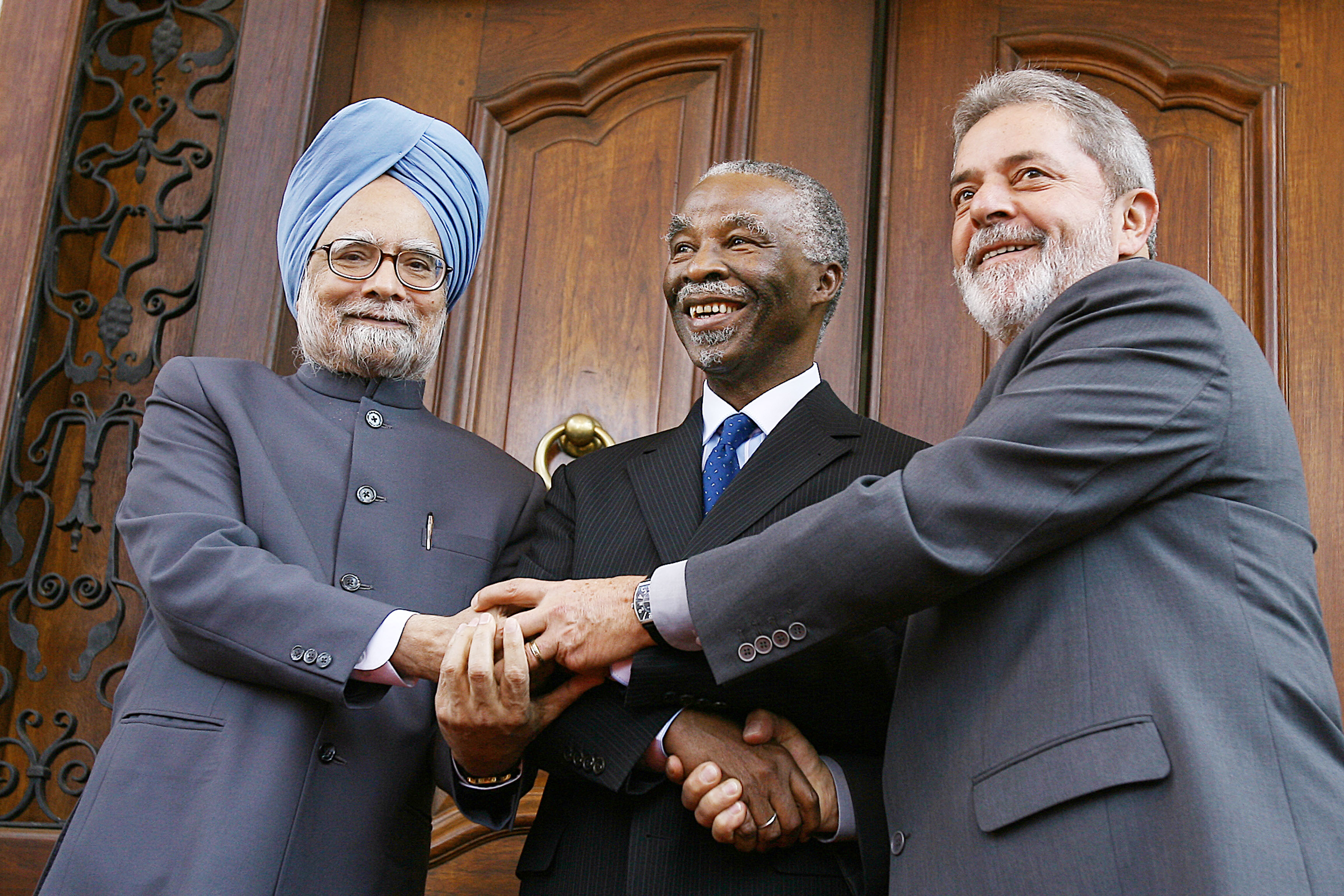
Indian PM Manmohan Singh with South African President Thabo Mbeki and Brazilian President Luiz Inácio Lula da Silva during the IBSA Summit, 2007.

On 6 June 2003, the Brasilia Declaration was signed by the foreign ministers of India, Brazil and South Africa. They agreed on the urgent need for reforms in the United Nations, especially the Security Council. The declaration was of the view that the United Nations Security Council should reflect the current world scenario. It also touched upon the subjects of international terrorism, trans-national crime and illegal arms dealing, stating that such threats to international peace must effectively tackled with respect for the sovereignty of States and for International Law.

The Ministers highlighted their priorities on promotion of social equity and inclusive growth by reiterating the need for tackling hunger and poverty by means of effective implementation of government schemes. The declaration also highlights the need for promoting family-run farms, food security, health, education, human rights and environmental protection. They recalled that social empowerment makes better use of human potential, contributing to economic development in a significant manner. The ministers also stressed the importance of elimination of racial discrimination and gender bias while framing

While welcoming the benefits that have been achieved through globalization and free market trade in the developing countries, the ministers expressed their concerns that a large part of the world has not benefited from it. In this context, they reiterated their commitment to pursue and implement policies which are inclusive, integrative and equitable. Toward this end, they reaffirmed their stand to carry out negotiations on Doha round of talks, through which the developed countries might eliminate some of their protectionist and trade-distorting practices, thereby providing a level playing field for the developing countries in the field of international trade.

The Ministers recommended to their respective Chiefs of State and/or Government the convening of a summit-level meeting of the three countries. They also decided to further intensify dialogue at all levels, when needed, to organize meetings of top officials and experts responsible for issues of mutual interest. They agreed to hold regular meetings and dialogues on issues of common interest. They further agreed to establish a Trilateral Joint Commission. The Foreign Ministries will be the pivots of the Trilateral Joint Commission and the meetings will be co-chaired by the three Foreign Ministers. The secretariat facilities shall be coordinated by the Secretary in charge of this area in the Foreign Ministry of the host country.

== Objectives ==
The IBSA Dialogue Forum aims to promote South-South cooperation and build consensus on issues of international importance. It also aims at increasing the trade opportunities among the three countries, as well as facilitate the trilateral exchange of information, technologies and skills to complement each other strengths. Subsequently, it promotes the international poverty alleviation and social development with main focus being on equitable development. It also aims to explore avenues to promote cooperation in broad range of areas, which include agriculture, climate change/global warming, culture, defence, education, energy, health, information society, science and technology, social development, trade and investment, tourism and transport.

== IBSA summits ==
	Date	Host country	Host leader	Location held
2006	September, 2006	Brazil	Luiz Inácio Lula da Silva	Brasília
2007	October, 2007	South Africa	Thabo Mbeki	Pretoria
2008	October, 2008	India	Manmohan Singh	New Delhi
2010	15 April 2010	Brazil	Luiz Inácio Lula da Silva	Brasília
2011	18 October 2011	South Africa	Jacob Zuma	Pretoria
2013	16 May 2013 (canceled)	India	Manmohan Singh	New Delhi
2025	23 November 2025	South Africa	Cyril Ramaphosa	Johannesburg

== Areas of cooperation ==
=== Agriculture ===
A Joint Development Project has been undertaken in Guinea Bissau. It aims to improve production, promote and develop small-scale agro-industry. It also seeks to improve and diversify horticultural crops. IBSA Ministers of Agriculture met in Rome on 22 November 2005 on the margins of a FAO Conference. This was followed by a meeting of IBSA Senior Officials in Agriculture in New Delhi on 18 & 19 January 2006. The meeting discussed a preparation of a draft Memorandum of Understanding which provides for development of plans for research and capacity building.

=== Education ===
The three countries have recognised Education as a vital instrument for achieving social equity. India is the lead country in the education sector. Three major areas of cooperation have been identified for collaboration namely, Open and distance education, higher and professional education and finally, universal education with focus on gender equality. Each of the three countries are to host one Round Table conference on one of the themes. India chose universal education, Brazil chose higher and professional education while South Africa chose open and distance education.

=== Energy ===
The working group aims to promote clean and efficient sources of energy such as bio-fuels. It also gives an opportunity to exchange information about renewable energy and use of non-conventional energy sources.

=== Science & technology ===
Science & technology has been identified as one of the key areas of tri-lateral cooperation. The following is a list of approved areas of research cooperation and the corresponding lead countries:

- HIV/AIDS and Nanotechnology- India
- Malaria and Oceanography- Brazil
- Tuberculosis and Biotechnology- South Africa

Activities in each area are implemented by Area coordinators, who are experts in their respective disciplines. Workshops in the above-mentioned disciplines have been held in the three countries regularly.

=== Trade ===
The IBSA economic ministers met in New Delhi in March 2005 and agreed on a mechanism to identify and eliminate non-tariff barriers which impede mutual trade. Some of the mechanisms considered include customs cooperation, sharing of expertise in the field of energy, agriculture, food processing, tourism and financial and banking services. It has been decided to promote cooperation in the SME sector. For this purpose, common terms of reference have been developed which can aid in development of this sector. As, all the three countries have a large number of small-scale enterprises, it is expected that cooperation in this sector can have profound development implications.

=== Transport ===
The Working group aims at cooperation between the three countries in the areas of air link expansions, training and knowledge exchange in airports and airspace management, port management, including capacity building in shipbuilding. Discussions on air and maritime agreements are also being considered. Development of trans-shipment facilities for creation of a South-South highway, which integrates sub-regional connection between Mercosur, Southern African Customs Union and Indian regions, is a priority area for the Working group.

== Declarations and communiqué ==
=== New Delhi agenda for cooperation ===
Yashwant Sinha, Celso Amorim and Dr. Nkosazana Dlamini-Zuma, the foreign ministers of India, Brazil and South Africa respectively, met in New Delhi on 4 and 5 March 2003 for the first meeting of the Trilateral Commission of the IBSA Dialogue Forum. The following issues were discussed:

==== United Nations reforms ====
The ministers were of the view that the current composition of the UN Security Council is not representative of the current world scenario. They highlighted the need for bringing about reforms which would make the Security council reflect the contemporary realities. Toward this end, they emphasised the need for expansion of Security council membership in the permanent as well as non-permanent categories.

==== Peace and security ====
The ministers took stock of the global security situation and renewed their commitments towards non-proliferation of weapons of mass destruction. They agreed to intensify their cooperation at the IAEA with a view to ensure growth and development of use of nuclear energy for peaceful purposes under appropriate safeguards. On the Israel–Palestine issue, the three countries urged an early resumption of dialogue on the basis of UN Security council resolutions, Arab League peace Initiative and the Quartet roadmap. They reaffirmed their support to the settlement postulated in the UN Security Council Resolution 1397 of two sovereign states, Israel and Palestine, living side by side within secured and recognised borders.

The three countries also had common views with respect to Iraq. They stressed the need to maintain the unity & integrity of Iraq and called for transfer of full sovereignty to the Iraqi people. They were of the view that United Nations need to play a vital role in this context. They also emphasised the urgency of reconstruction in Iraq under a democratically elected sovereign government.

==== Social development ====
The three countries recognised the need to put people in the centre of development. Toward this end, the ministers emphasised the need to formulate people-centric policies which would ensure equitable development. As the three countries have a rich cultural history, strengthening of cultural ties by organising a trilateral cultural fair of music, dance and cinema in Brazil was also discussed. Recalling the Brasilia declaration, the ministers agreed upon the sharing of expertise in diverse areas such as food security, health, education, human rights etc. The Ministers also endorsed a proposal by Brazil to host a seminar on "Economic Growth with Social Equity" with the aim to promote better knowledge among IBSA members of their national policies and strategies to promote economic and social development.

=== Cape Town ministerial communiqué ===
The foreign ministers of the three countries met in Cape Town on 10 and 11 March 2005 for the second meeting of the Trilateral Commission of the IBSA Dialogue Forum. The following issues were discussed:

==== Millennium review summit ====
The ministers reiterated their commitments toward achieving the Millennium Development Goals by 2015 as their core strategy in their collective fight against hunger, poverty, and other problems ailing their society. The ministers emphasised that South-South cooperation was essential for achievement of MDGs and they reaffirmed their cooperation under the auspices of IBSA to achieve these targets.

==== New Partnership for Africa's Development ====
The ministers resolved to support the economic development of the African Union and strengthen the IBSA partnership in the implementation of New Partnership for Africa's Development (NEPAD). Numerous opportunities exist in the fields of trade & commerce, energy, education, health and the ministers pledged to explore opportunities for trilateral cooperation in these areas.

==== Latin and South American integration ====
The ministers expressed their support for creation of an Asian-African business summit which would focus on promoting and strengthening the African private sector. They also made a decision to explore ways for closer cooperation with South America. The ministers also welcomed the efforts towards integration in the Latin America and Caribbean region and in this regard recognised the significance of the creation of the South American Community of Nations (CASA).

==== World trade organisation ====
The ministers agreed to intensify their cooperation in the WTO multilateral trade negotiations in the lead-up to the WTO Ministerial Conference of 2005 held in Hong Kong. This cooperation aimed to realise the Doha development agenda and to enhance trade opportunities in a free and fair manner with transparent-rules based multilateral trading system.

==== IBSA sectoral cooperation ====
The ministers reviewed the working of sectoral working groups and decided to add two new sectors namely, agriculture and culture. In the context of Information Technology, the ministers were of the view that their governments had many e-governance schemes which had many similarities, because of which they might share some information, best practices and identify projects for cooperation.

The ministers agreed for strengthening consultations between the Ministries and Departments of Agriculture in support of IBSA and G-20 trade consultation processes. They decided that a meeting of IBSA experts would be convened in India to define areas for research and training in the field of agriculture. The ministers welcomed the launch of IBSA Business Council, which would work in tandem with the Working group jointly in the areas such as Small, Medium and Micro Enterprises. With regard to promote tourism between the three countries, a mechanism is being explored to examine the possibility of visa waiver or the issuing of visas on arrival for IBSA nationals. Apart from this cooperation in various other sectors were also explored during this meeting.

==== IBSA facility for hunger and poverty alleviation ====
The Ministers reviewed the progress made with regard to the operationalisation of the IBSA Facility for Hunger and Poverty Alleviation. They also agreed to commit an additional amount of US$1 million to the IBSA fund and launch of the facility in Guinea-Bissau, which they hoped would raise the profile of the fund amongst private sector and members of civil society. The Ministers agreed that IBSA would approach the Palestinian Authority with an offer to assist it with its reconstruction efforts.

=== Rio de Janeiro ministerial communiqué ===
Anand Sharma, Celso Amorim and Dr. Nkosazana Dlamini-Zuma, the foreign ministers of India, Brazil and South Africa respectively, met in Rio de Janeiro on 30 March 2006 for the third meeting of the Trilateral Commission of the IBSA Dialogue Forum. The following issues were raised and discussed:

==== United Nations reforms ====
The IBSA countries exchanged their views on UN security council reforms and reiterated their stand that representation of developing countries from Asia, Africa and Latin America as permanent members in the council was essential. They welcomed the creation of Peacebuilding commission and United Nations Human Rights Council, adding further that now UN reform process must include Security Council reform.

==== Non-proliferation, disarmament and arms control ====
The ministers were of the view that multilateral institutions established under various disarmament agreements should be the primary mechanism to achieve the desired objective of disarmament and non-proliferation. They agreed to continue cooperation at IAEA and other forums with regard to peaceful use of atomic energy under suitable safeguards. They also agreed to consider enhancing international civilian nuclear cooperation, with other nations who share similar objectives of non-proliferation. The ministers also hoped for a peaceful resolution to the Iranian nuclear program, within the context of IAEA.

==== International trade ====
The ministers emphasised the need to unite on the issue of Doha round of negotiations. This is supported by increased consultations, by IBSA delegations, in order to strengthen Non-Agricultural Market Access (NAMA), as well as the establishment of the NAMA-11 whose two main principles are supporting flexibilities for developing countries and balance between NAMA and other areas under negotiation. The Ministers took note of the broader objectives of the European Union proposed Registration, Evaluation and Authorization and restriction of Chemicals (REACH) Legislation, in respect of the protection of human health and the environment. They expressed their concern for the consequences REACH may have on the developing economies of the South. Such consequences will negatively affect the attainment of the Millennium Development Goals in these countries. The ministers urged the EU to give due consideration to these consequences and also ensure that REACH does not become a Technical Barrier to Trade (TBT).

==== IBSA facility fund for hunger and poverty alleviation ====
The fundamental character IBSA fund is to disseminate the best practices in alleviation of poverty and hunger. The ministers reaffirmed the importance of participation of institutions— governmental as well as non-governmental—in projects financed by the fund. They also recommended that UNDP, as an administrator of the fund, find means to make it possible.

The ministers also received and accepted the recommendations of Technical Monitoring Committee (TMC) to Guinea Bissau. It urged the UNDP Office in Bissau to work closely with the UNDP Special Unit for South-South Cooperation in New York, the Coordinator of the project and the Guinean Bissau national authorities. The ministers agreed with the committee's recommendation of signing additional agreements with UNDP in order to clarify rights and obligations of both parties.

==== IBSA sectoral cooperation ====
The member countries made a pledge to promote the production and use of biofuels as a clean and ecofriendly alternative. More emphasis will be placed on exchange of information in areas of energy conservation and hydrogen energy. The ministers stressed the need to boost trade relations among the three nations. Keeping this in perspective, they expressed their satisfaction that Mercosur will be proposing to Southern African Customs Union and India the creation of a Working Group to explore the modalities of a Trilateral Free Trade Agreement (T-FTA) among them. Specific areas of agriculture have also been identified for trilateral cooperation. These include research and capacity building, agricultural trade, rural development and poverty alleviation.

==== IBSA trade and investment forum ====
The attending delegations were of the opinion that trade relations between the three nations can strengthen the South-South union. Substitution of imports from northern countries by imports from southern countries was suggested as a feasible solution towards attaining the said objective. Logistics, custom procedures, lack of information and distances were identified as main barriers which needed to be eliminated for the trilateral trade to flourish.

The logistics problem was sought to be solved by suggestion of a study to further address the issue. Problems regarding customs procedures were sought to be tackled by ensuring more cooperation among the governmental institutions in order to simplify many regulations and streamlining the process. The private sector was also of the view that number of flights between India, Brazil and South Africa need to be increased, which eliminate the barrier of distances and lack of information no problem.

== Agreements and Memorandum of Understanding ==
The following agreements have been signed so far:

- MoU on Agriculture and Allied Fields
- MoU on Biofuels
- Agreement on Merchant Shipping and Other Maritime Transport Matters
- Action Plan on Trade Facilitation for Standards, Technical Regulations and Conformity Assessment
- MoU Framework for Cooperation on the Information Society

== BRICS ==
South Africa sought to join the BRIC organisation starting August 2010 and in December 2010 was officially invited to join. South Africa attended the April 2011 summit, and the group is now known as BRICS, with S standing for South Africa. Brazil, Russia, India, China, and South Africa now represents a superset of the countries that IBSA represents. Some see BRICS and IBSA as potential geopolitical competitors.

== See also ==
- 2010 BRIC Summit
- IBSAMAR – joint military exercises conducted by the Indian, Brazilian, and South African navies
- List of country groupings
- List of multilateral free trade agreements
