= 2010 IBSA summit =

- Host country: Brazil
- Dates: April 15, 2010

The 2010 IBSA summit took place in Brasília, Brazil on April 15, 2010. The meeting took place between the three heads of government from the IBSA states. This was the fourth such meeting.

== Overview ==
The IBSA grouping was a result of the need for South-South co-operation as envision by the bigger players for the each region in the hemisphere. This year's summit marked the return to the founding location of the grouping.

This meeting to place on the sidelines of the larger BRIC gathering also in Brasília.

Trade between the IBSA grouping went from US$2.6 billion in 2002 to US$11.9 billion in 2009.

== Leaders at the summit ==
The heads of state and heads of government of the three countries participated.

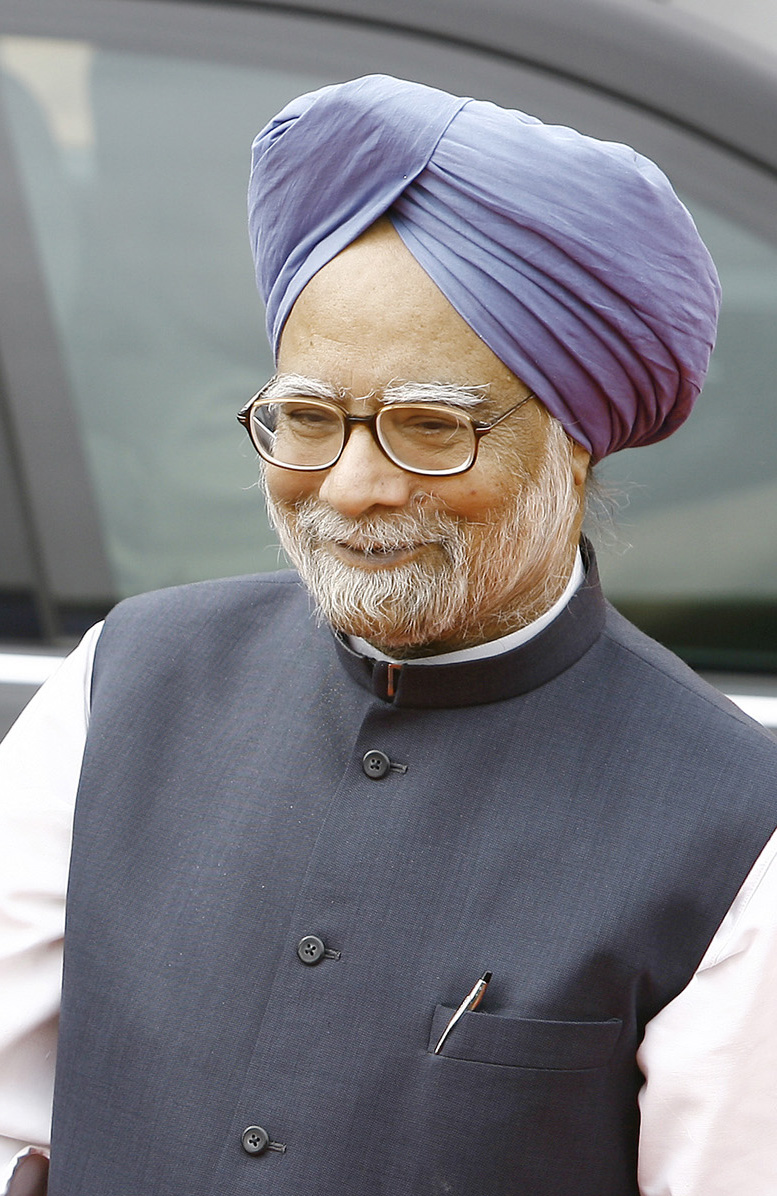
India
Manmohan Singh, Prime Minister

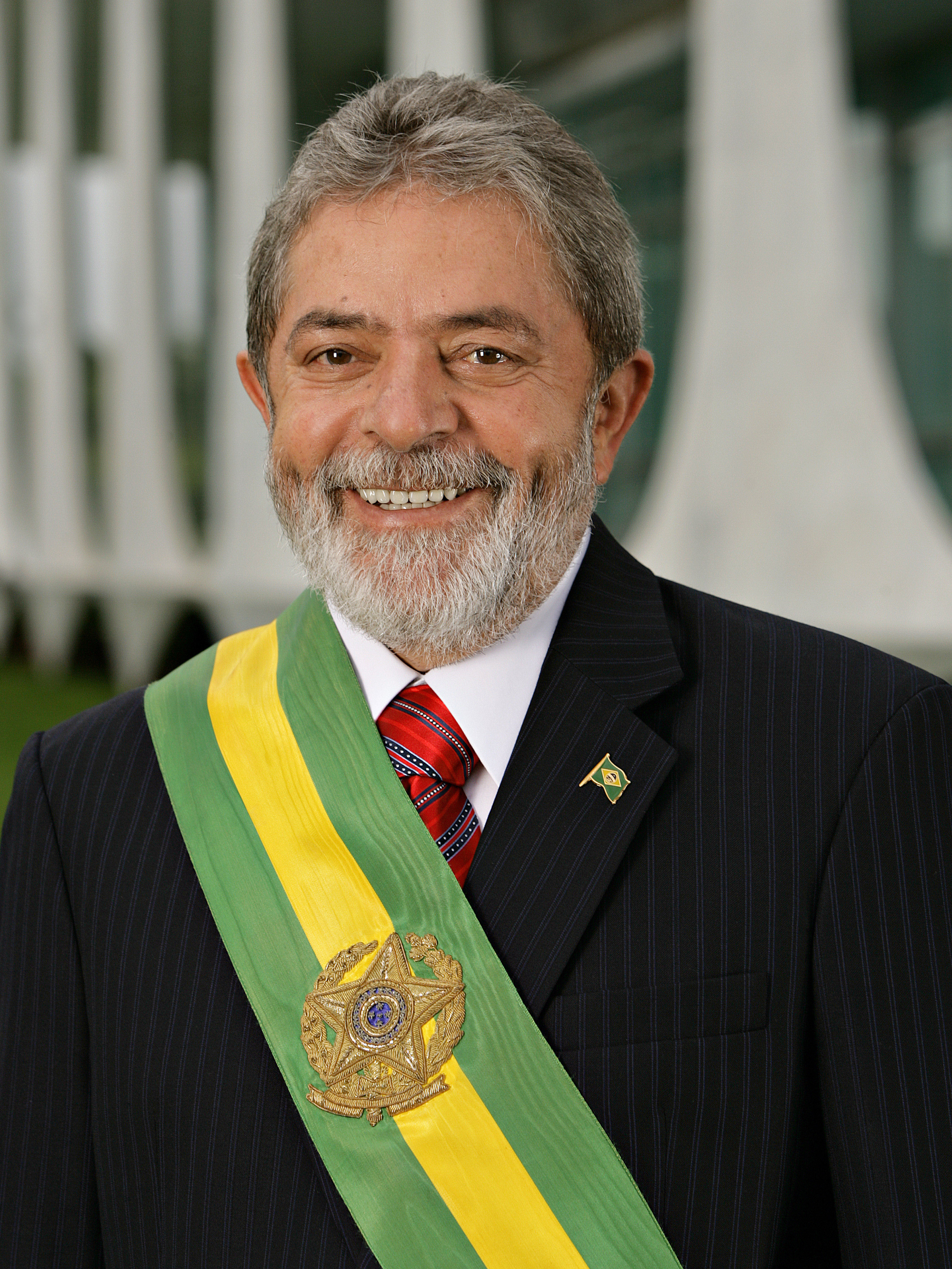
Brazil
Luiz Inácio Lula da Silva, President (host)

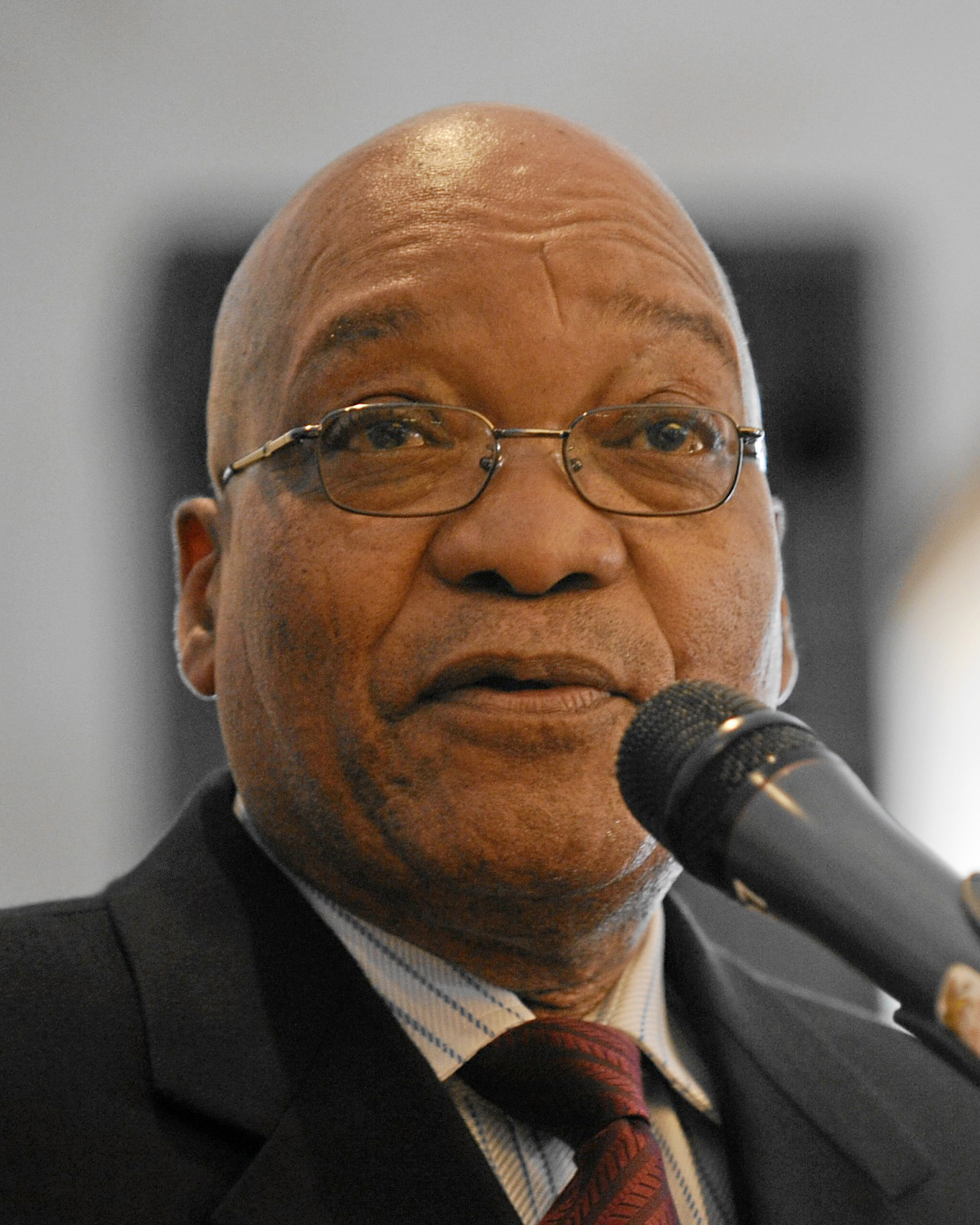
South Africa
Jacob Zuma, President

== Issues ==
The leaders discussed various issues including the Iran and nuclear weapons, the Middle East conflict, the furtherance of IBSA, reconstruction of Haiti through the IBSA Fund for Alleviation of Poverty and Hunger, and cooperation in science and technology.

Additionally, other meets occurred on the side between April 12 to 15 such as: the IBSA Academic Forum; the 15th IBSA Focal Points Meeting; a meeting between IBSA Focal Points and the United Nations Development Program; the IBSA parliamentary forum; a round table on local governance; the IBSA Women’s Forum; the IBSA Editor’s Forum; the IBSA Small Business CEOs meeting; and an exhibition on the IBSA Fund.

=== Iran ===
The IBSA leaders called for more talks on the Iranian nuclear weapon issue.

=== Palestine ===
The IBSA took rhetorical steps on such international issues as the Middle East conflict. Indian PM Singh called the group "a strong moral force in today's unsettled world," saying the significance of the group of "three major democracies" extended beyond the bilateral ties between its members. IBSA also invited representatives of the Palestinians for the first time. The three countries were to jointly fund sports facilities in Ramallah. The leaders also expressed strong disappointment over the continued construction of settlements by Israel and committed IBSA to "pro-actively" support the formation of a viable Palestinian state. IBSA members said they were "convinced that a comprehensive peace in the Middle East is crucial, not only for the peoples and countries of the region, but also for the international peace and security."

The IBSA states, who said they have good relations with both the Arab-Palestinians and the Israelis, also reiterated a willingness to contribute to the peace process. They elucidated that the human rights situation in the Palestinian Territories was a subject of joint interventions at the United Nations Human Rights Council in 2009. The group were also "convinced that a comprehensive peace in the Middle East is crucial, not only for the peoples and countries of the region, but also for the international peace and security." They further called for an "urgent resumption of negotiations" along the lines of "UN Resolutions, the Madrid principles, the Road Map and the Arab Peace Initiative.

Furthermore, the IBSA Fund said it would build a sports center in the city of Ramallah. The group also supported the need for youth sports leagues. An additional US$2 million would be granted for projects in the Occupied Territories.

=== Furtherance of IBSA ===
India took the initiative to call for improving the importance of the BRIC and IBSA groups. Indian PM Singh also called for closer cooperation in the fields of energy and food security, as well as tapping into the potential of other sectors such as trade and investment, science and technology and infrastructure. He added that pooling together the experiences of each can lead to more inclusive growth. "We are four large countries with abundant resources, large populations and diverse societies... We aspire for rapid growth for ourselves and for an external environment that is conducive to our development goals. [Our people] expect us to work together so as to bring the benefits of inclusive social and economic development to them. Our grouping includes two of the largest energy producers and two of the largest consumers in the world. We can cooperate in both upstream and downstream areas, and in the development of new fuels and clean energy technologies."

== Reactions ==
During the conference a new book, the IBSA Women’s Forum – Elaborating an Inclusive Macroeconomic Structure: a South-South feminist approach was launched.

== See also ==
- Foreign relations of Brazil
- Foreign relations of India
- Foreign relations of South Africa
