= 3rd BRICS summit =

2011 international summit in Sanya, China

3rd BRICS Summit 金砖国家领导人第三次会晤
- 14 April 2011

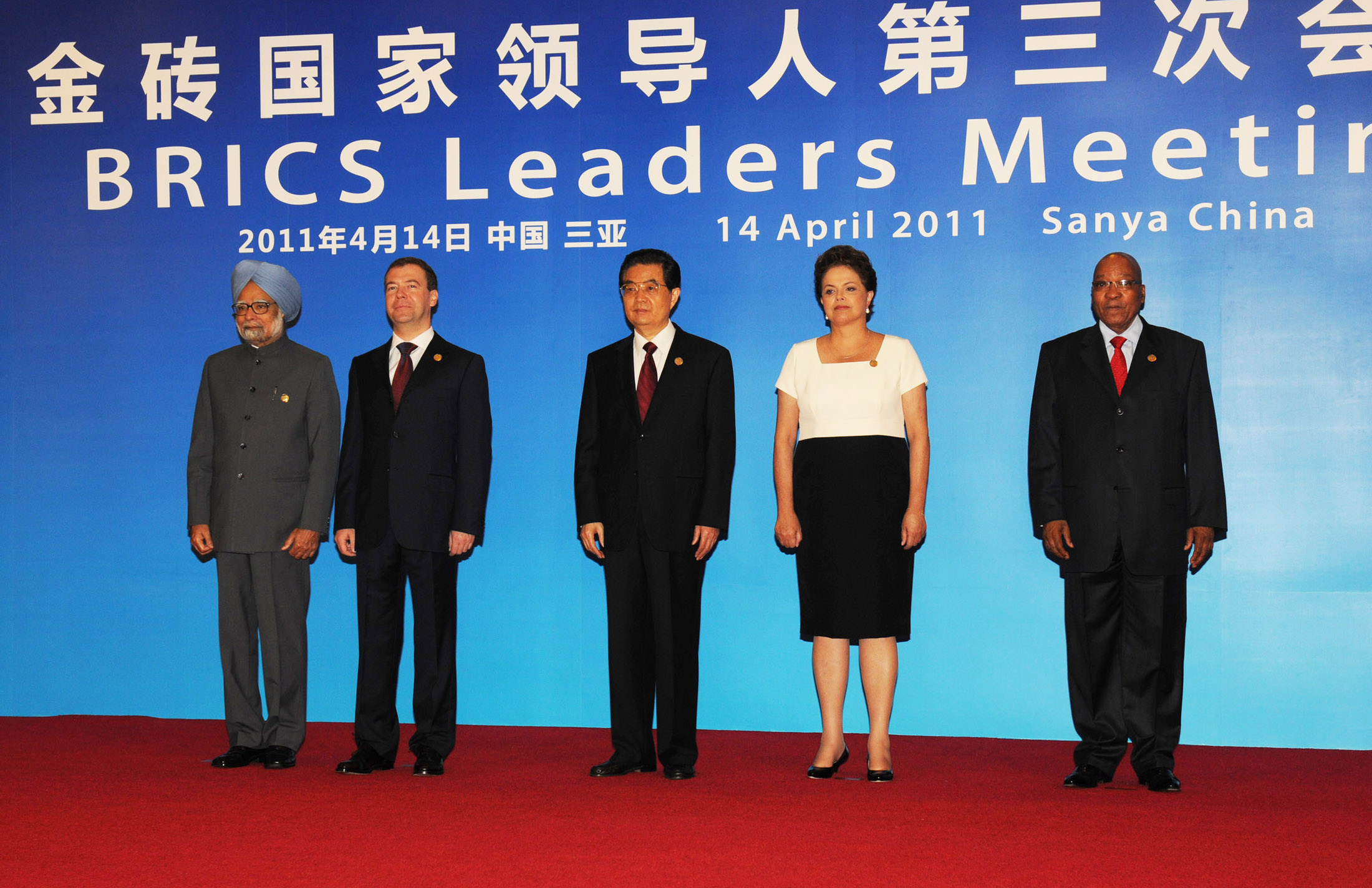
- Logo of the 2011 BRICS summit
- Host country: China
- Cities: Sanya
- Venues: Sheraton Sanya Resort
- Participants: Brazil; Russia; India; China; South Africa

The 2011 BRICS summit (Chinese: 金砖国家领导人第三次会晤) took place in Sanya on the island of Hainan, China, on 14 April 2011. This was the third BRICS summit since 2009 and the first to formally include South Africa after its accession to the group in December 2010. The meeting took place among the five heads of state/heads of government from the BRICS states following bilateral meetings in the prior days.

== Background ==
Following a meeting in Brasília in 2010, to which South Africa was invited as a guest, the group invited South Africa to join as a full member in 2011 and the group formerly called BRIC officially became BRICS.

=== Theme and Vision ===
The Chinese president chaired the BRICS Leaders Meeting in southern China's resort city of Sanya, and gave a speech under the theme of "Broad Vision, Shared Prosperity." The theme was based under the vision as 'The 21st century should be marked by peace, harmony, cooperation and scientific development.'

== Discussions ==
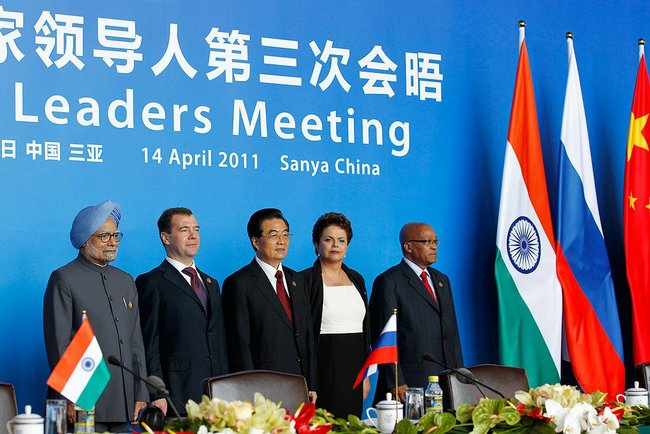
Picture of the BRICS national leaders at the event.

=== Economics ===
On 13 April, prior to the heads of state meeting, economic delegations met for discussions. China was lobbied by the other leaders to import not only commodities but also value added products and other commodities such as oil, soybeans and iron ore. Indian Trade Minister Anand Sharma said that China's Commerce Minister Chen Deming had assured the other leaders that his country would make it a priority to import more value-added products from the other four countries. Russia’s Deputy Economic Development Minister Oleg Fomichev also said that China pledged to set up high-technology projects in cooperation with Russia so as to "not just importing our resources and exporting industrial goods."

Brazil and India also pressed China to buy such goods as Brazilian aircraft and Indian pharmaceuticals; the two countries also complained about the artificially undervalued yuan that they claimed was undermining their exports. South Africa wanted to process iron ore and other raw materials within the country before exporting them to China. However, at the heads of government summit China's currency valuation was not on the agenda.

All five countries also continued their calls for reform of global monetary and financial institutions. They also pledged greater cooperation amongst themselves.

=== International law ===
All five countries also called for an early conclusion to deadlocked talks an anti-terror law under UN auspices that would curtail funding for illegal groups that partake in violence against countries and deny their supporters access to funds, arms, and safe havens. A joint statement read: "We reiterate our strong condemnation of terrorism in all its forms and manifestations and stress that there can be no justification, whatsoever, for any acts of terrorism. In this context, we urge early conclusion of negotiations in the UN General Assembly of the Comprehensive Convention on International Terrorism and its adoption by all member states." The heads of government at the summit said that the UN's role was central in coordinating international action against what they labeled terrorism within the framework of the UN Charter and in accordance with principles and norms of international law.

=== United Nations Security Council reform ===
All BRICS countries called for "comprehensive reform of the UN, including its Security Council." China said it would endorse the aspirations of India, Brazil and South Africa for permanent membership of the UNSC. Coincidentally, the five countries are all now members of the Security Council, China and Russia as permanent members and the other three non-permanent.

=== Trade medium ===
The groups announced their decision to cease mutual trade payments in U.S. dollars and instead henceforth give credits to one another in their national currencies alone. The development banks of each state signed an agreement to further gradually alter loan currencies from U.S. dollars. This was intended to strengthen financial cooperation between the BRICS countries, as well as to expand the international significance of their national currencies.

=== Libyan civil war ===
The leaders of BRICS states expressed misgivings about NATO air strikes during the 2011 Libyan civil war and urged an end to the two-month conflict in Libya.

== Participants ==
The heads of state/heads of government of the five countries participated.

**Core BRICS members** Host state and leader are shown in bold text.
Member		Represented by	Title
(Brazil)	Brazil	Dilma Rousseff	President
(Russia)	Russia	Dmitry Medvedev	President
(India)	India	Manmohan Singh	Prime Minister
(China)	**China**	**Hu Jintao**	**CCP General Secretary and President**
(South Africa)	South Africa	Jacob Zuma	President

== Gallery of participating leaders ==
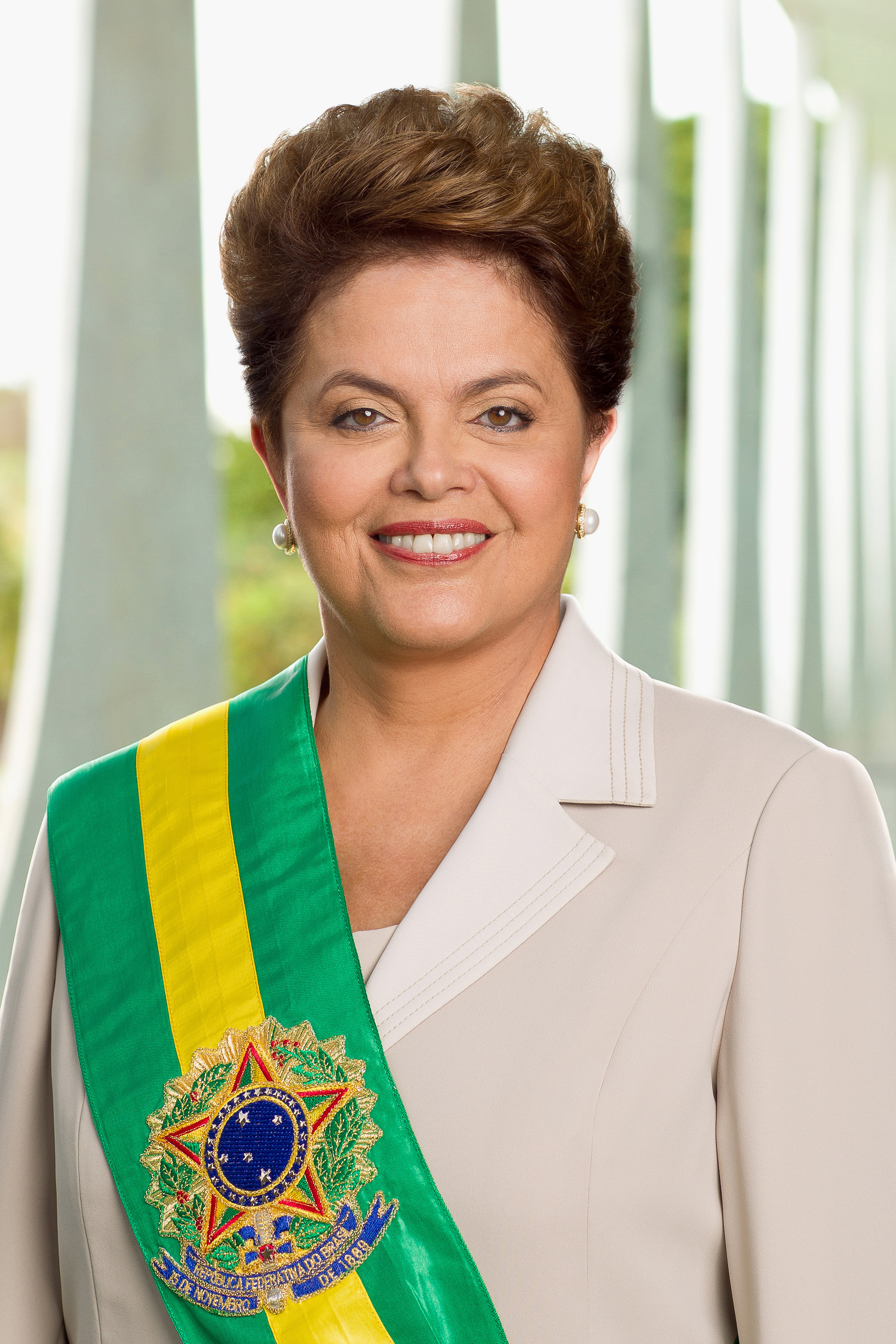
**(Brazil) Dilma Rousseff**
President

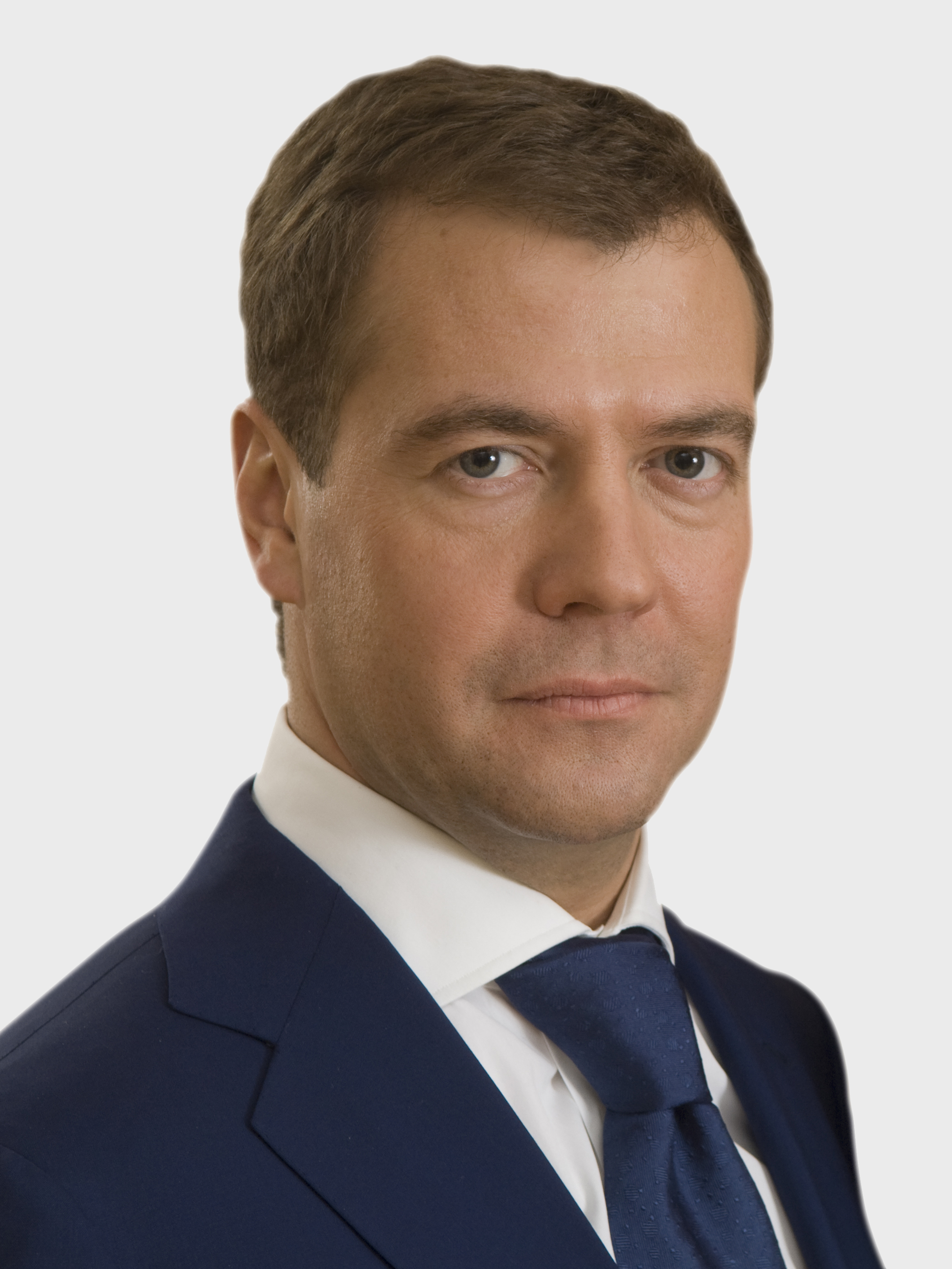
**(Russia) Dmitry Medvedev**
President

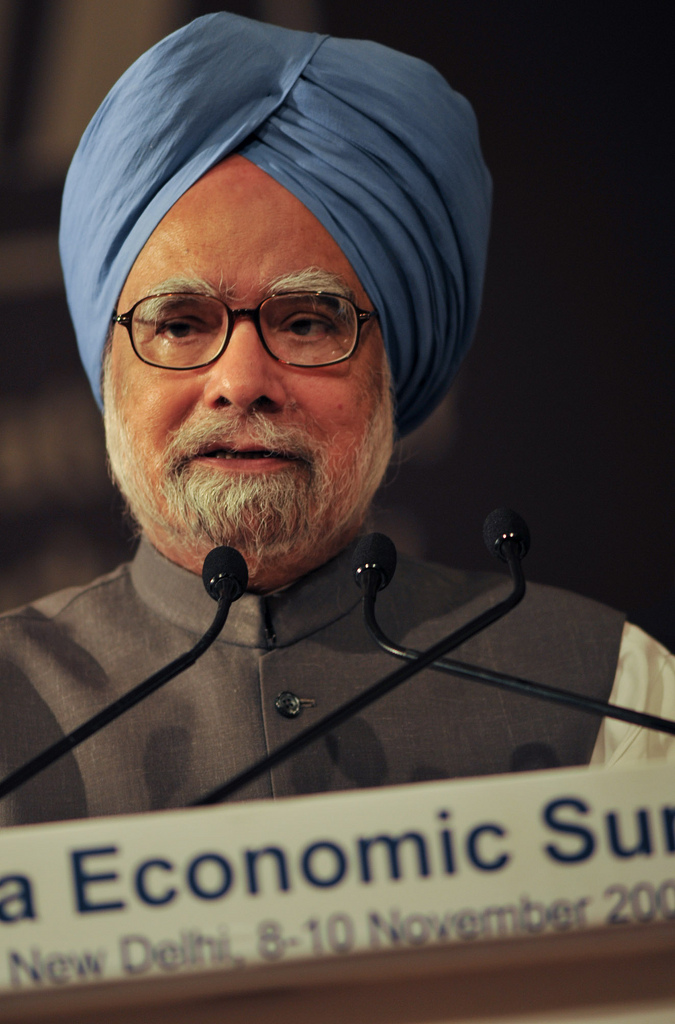
**(India) Manmohan Singh**
Prime Minister

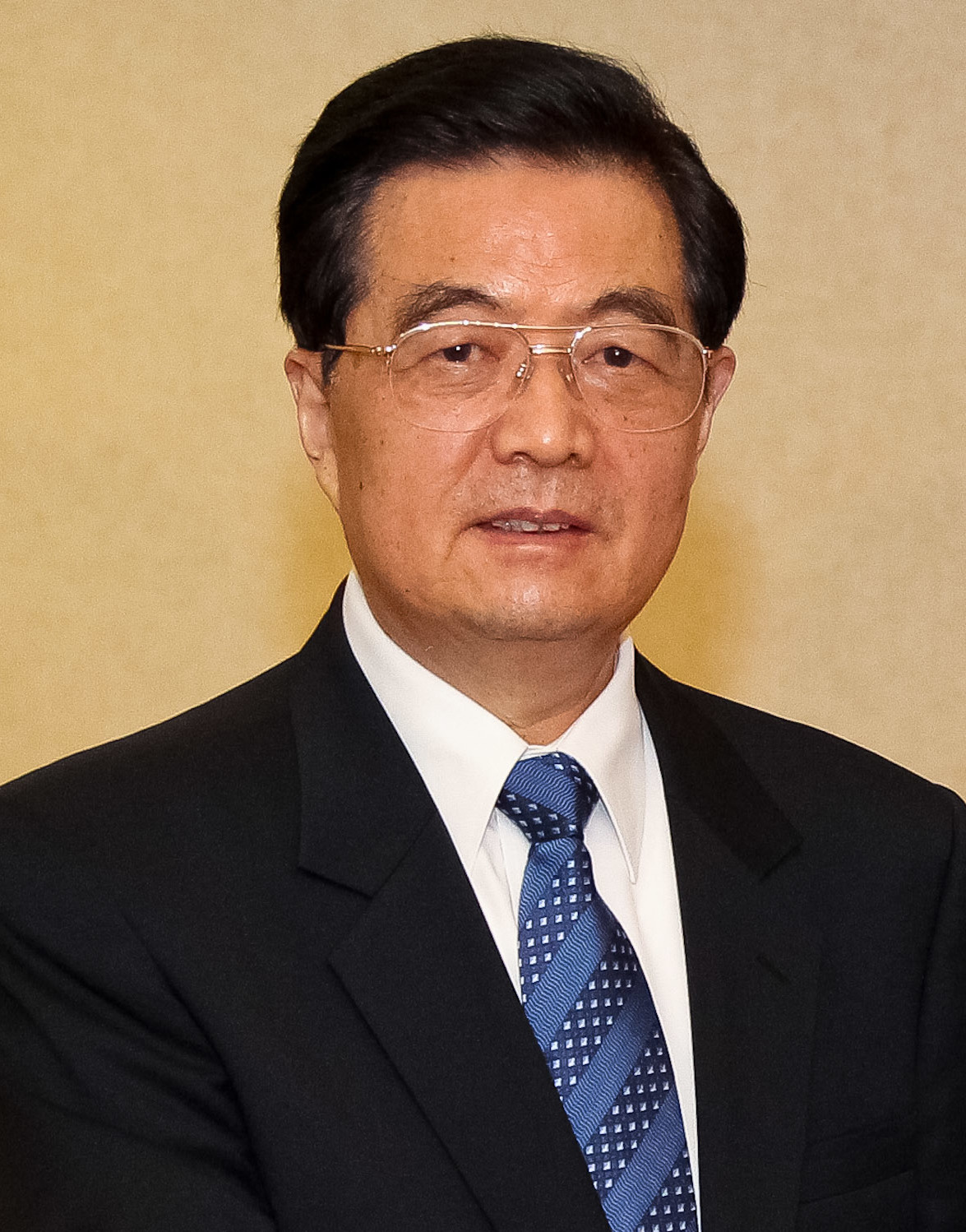
**(China) Hu Jintao**
**CCP General Secretary and President (Host)**

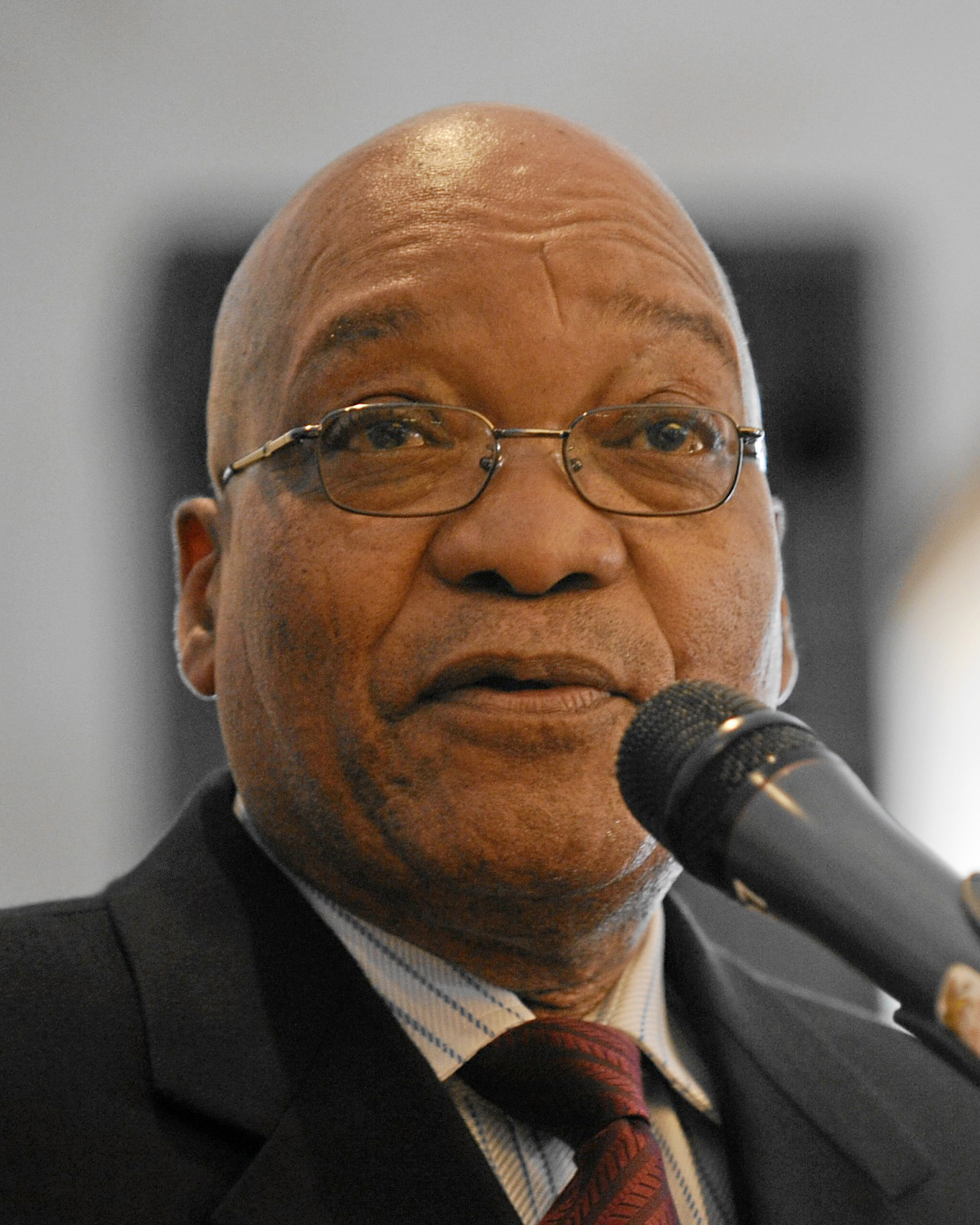
**(South Africa) Jacob Zuma**
President

== Reactions ==
Al Jazeera read the meeting as that of giving "this ad-hoc group an opportunity to test its collective strength ahead of an all-important G-20 meeting in France in November and to bring the concerns of developing nations (sic) to the top of the global agenda."

Jim O’Neill, the chairman of Goldman Sachs Asset Management International and the person who coined the term BRIC, said that the countries "don’t have the same interests. The wealth per head is very different, the politics is very different, and the philosophy and their natural economic edge is different."

A commentator at the Financial Times website lamented the low level of access granted to his and other mainstream Western media outlets but nonetheless found it hopeful that the organisation's meetings provided, for instance, for regular Sino-Indian interaction when their bilateral relationship could carry considerable tension. He also saw hope amongst "the anodyne talk of cooperation and friendship...[in the] predictable but significant statement" in the Sanya declaration in favour of "comprehensive reform of the UN, including its Security Council."

== See also ==
- Foreign relations of Brazil
- Foreign relations of Russia
- Foreign relations of India
- Foreign relations of China
- Foreign relations of South Africa
