= Cebu Declaration on East Asian Energy Security =

2007 international declaration on energy security

- Type: Incentive
- Industry: Society
- Founded: 2007; Singapore
- Headquarters: Singapore

The Cebu Declaration on East Asian Energy Security was signed by 16 nations after a three-hour meeting of delegates at the 2nd East Asia Summit in Cebu on January 15, 2007. The countries have agreed to promote energy security and find energy alternatives to conventional fuels.

The Declaration lists a series of goals aimed at providing "reliable, adequate and affordable" energy supplies. It was signed by the 10 ASEAN members, Indonesia, Malaysia, Philippines, Singapore, Thailand, Brunei, Vietnam, Laos, Burma and Cambodia; as well as the six ASEAN partner nations, China, Japan, New Zealand, India, South Korea and Australia.

The Cebu Declaration was followed by the Singapore Declaration on Climate Change, Energy and the Environment at the 3rd East Asia Summit.

== Background ==
Due to strong economic growth, energy consumption in the Asia-Pacific region rose much faster than in any other region between the years 1990 and 2005. This was primarily driven by fossil fuels, resulting in the East Asian region being heavily dependent on imports of oil. In addition, energy intensity in the region was much worse than in other regions of the world. These factors combined resulted in significant greenhouse gas emissions, as well as lowered energy security in the region. These were the factors which the Cebu Declaration set out to address.

== Provisions ==
The Cebu Declaration called for close cooperation between ASEAN nations, as well as with partner nations, to reduce dependence on conventional fuels for the sake of energy security. Five primary resolutions were included in the Declaration: improved energy efficiency in the use of existing fossil fuels; increased investment and cooperation in the development of renewable energy sources, particularly biofuels and hydropower; the opening up of regional markets to improve energy affordability; introduction of policies for greenhouse gas mitigation; and increased private investment in the energy sector. However, no specific emissions timelines or commitments were included in the Declaration.

Additional provisions in the Declaration included investment into the construction of the integrated transnational ASEAN Power Grid and a Trans-ASEAN Gas Pipeline, development and implementation of clean coal and nuclear power technologies, and a common standard for biofuel use in motor vehicles.

== See also ==
- Second East Asian Summit
- Renewable energy in Vietnam
- Climate change
