= First East Asia Summit =

Inaugural Pan-Asia forum

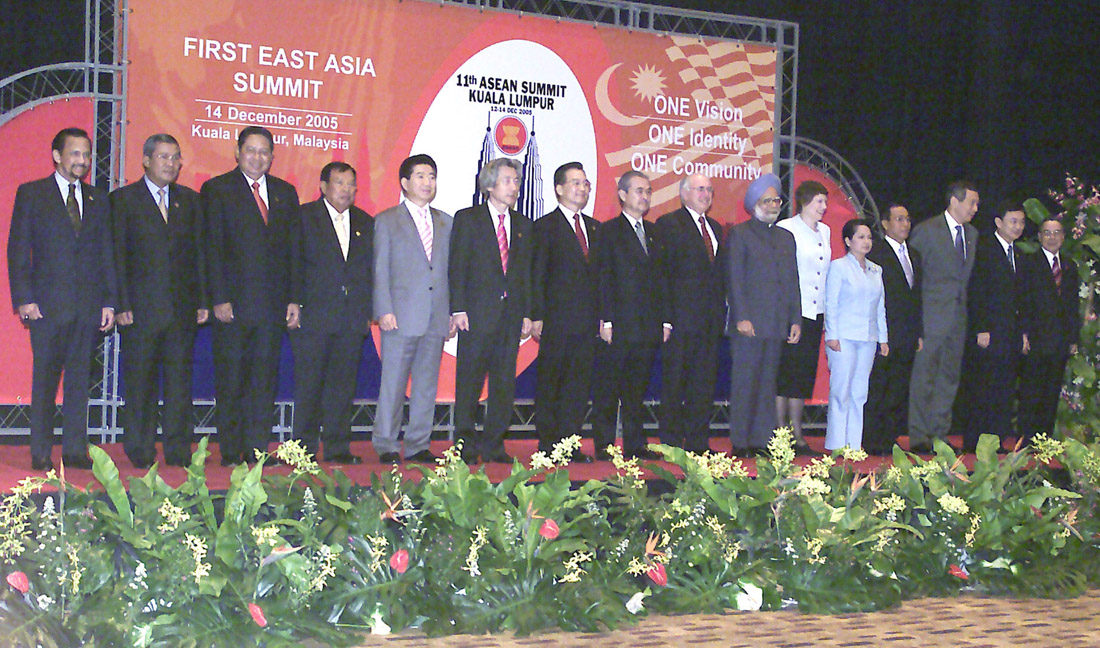
- The First East Asia Summit was held in Kuala Lumpur, Malaysia on 14 December 2005.
- Host country: Malaysia
- Date: 14 December 2005
- Cities: Kuala Lumpur
- Participants: EAS members
- Precedes: Second East Asia Summit

The First East Asia Summit was held in Kuala Lumpur, Malaysia on 14 December 2005. The East Asia Summit (EAS) is a pan-Asia forum held annually by the leaders of 16 countries in the East Asian region. EAS meetings are held after annual ASEAN leaders' meetings.

== Attending delegations ==
The 16 countries and 1 observer involved were:

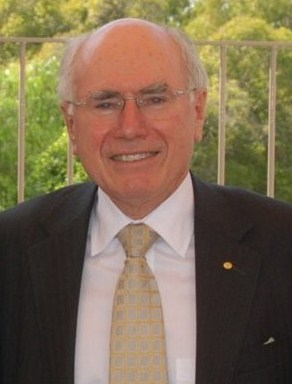
John Howard
Prime Minister of Australia

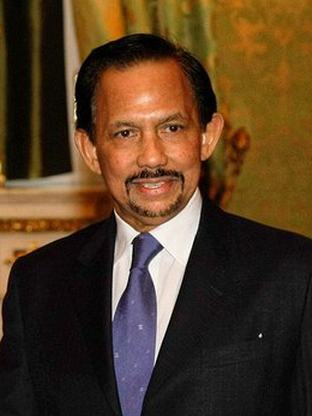
Hassanal Bolkiah
Sultan & Prime Minister of Brunei

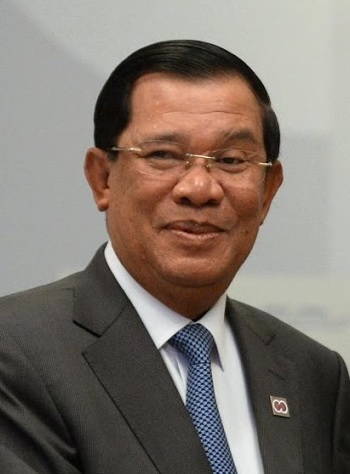
Hun Sen
Prime Minister of Cambodia

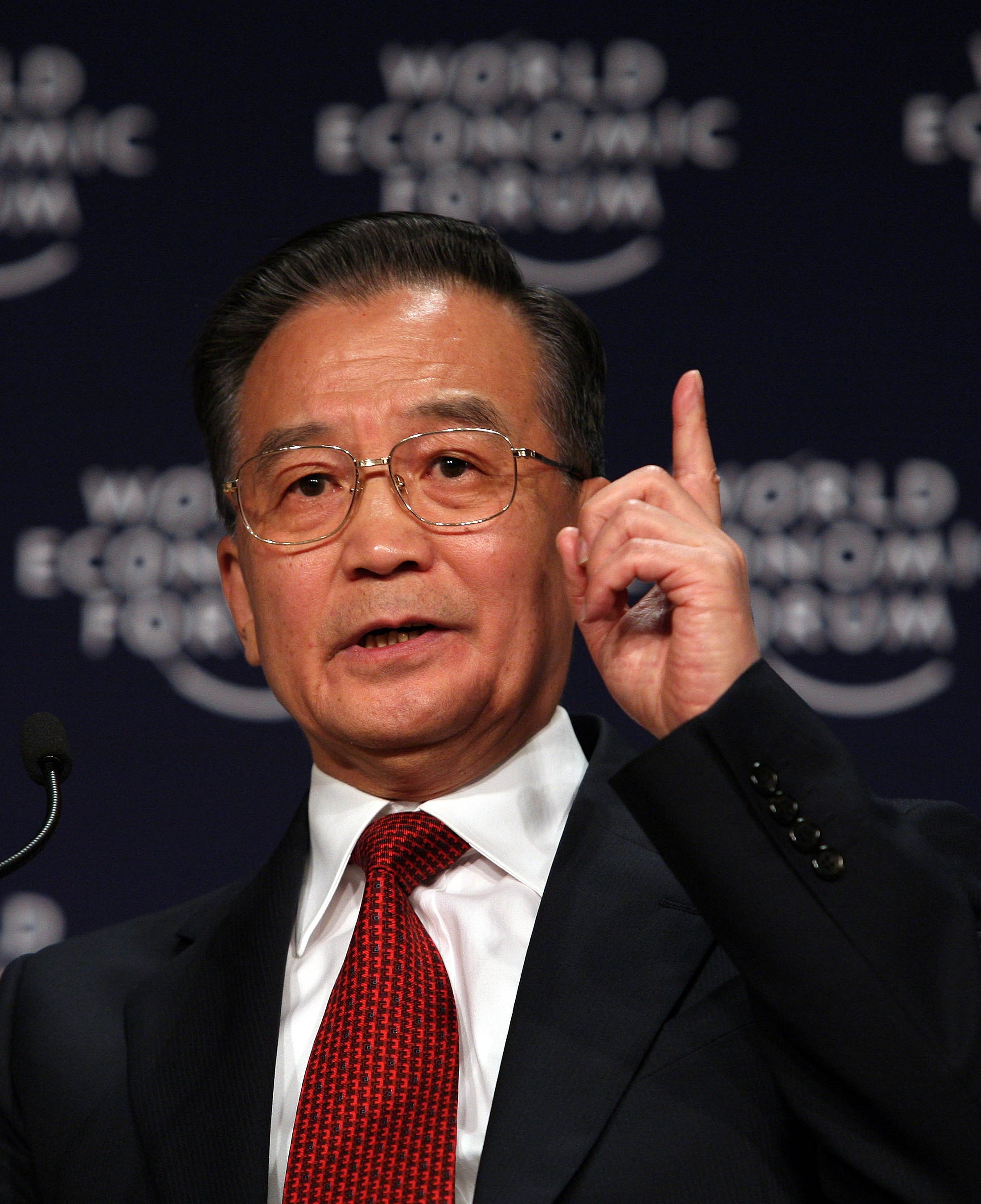
Wen Jiabao
Premier of China

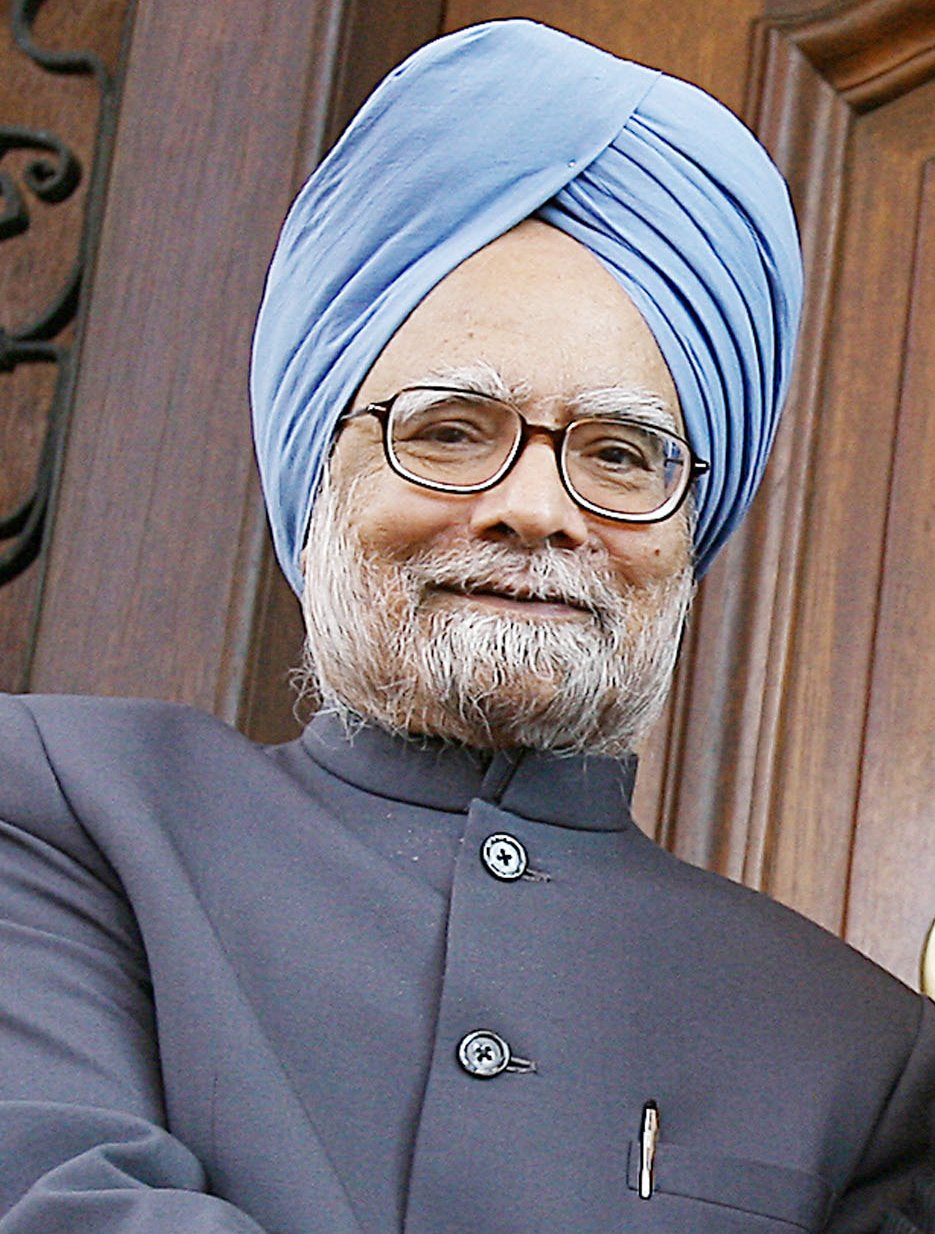
Manmohan Singh
Prime Minister of India

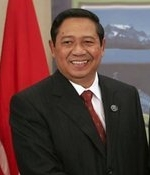
Susilo Bambang Yudhoyono
President of Indonesia

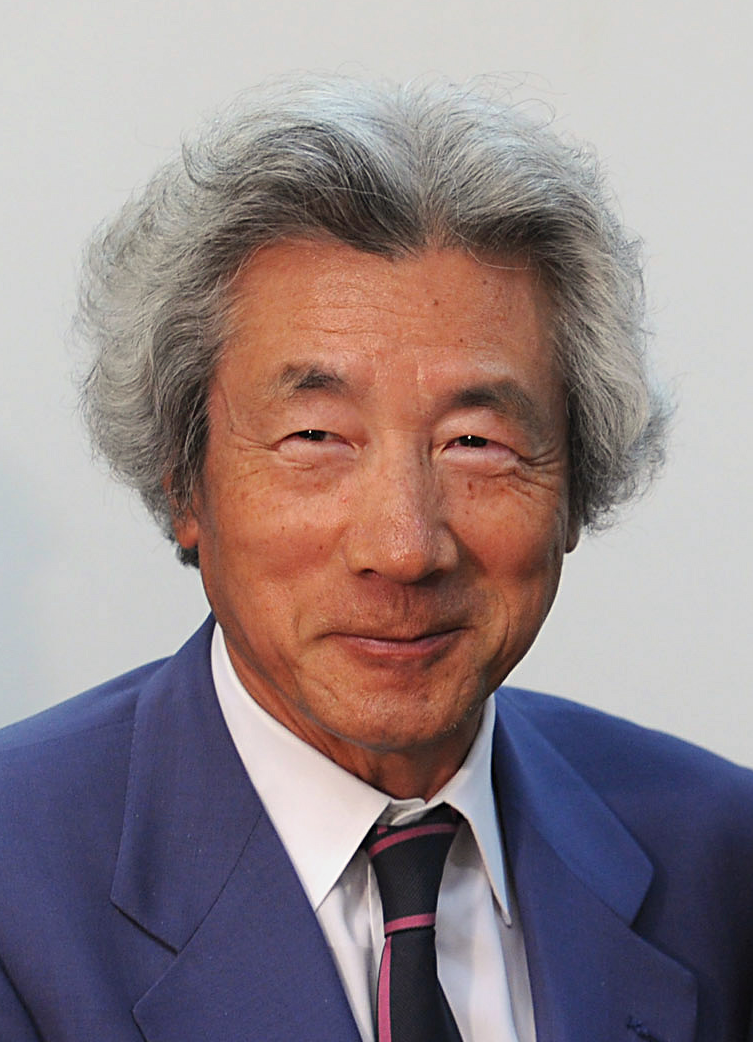
Junichiro Koizumi
Prime Minister of Japan

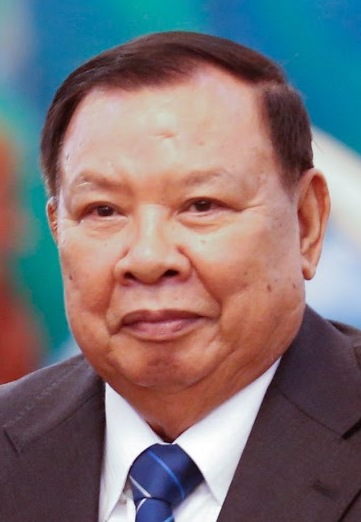
Bounnhang Vorachith
Prime Minister of Laos

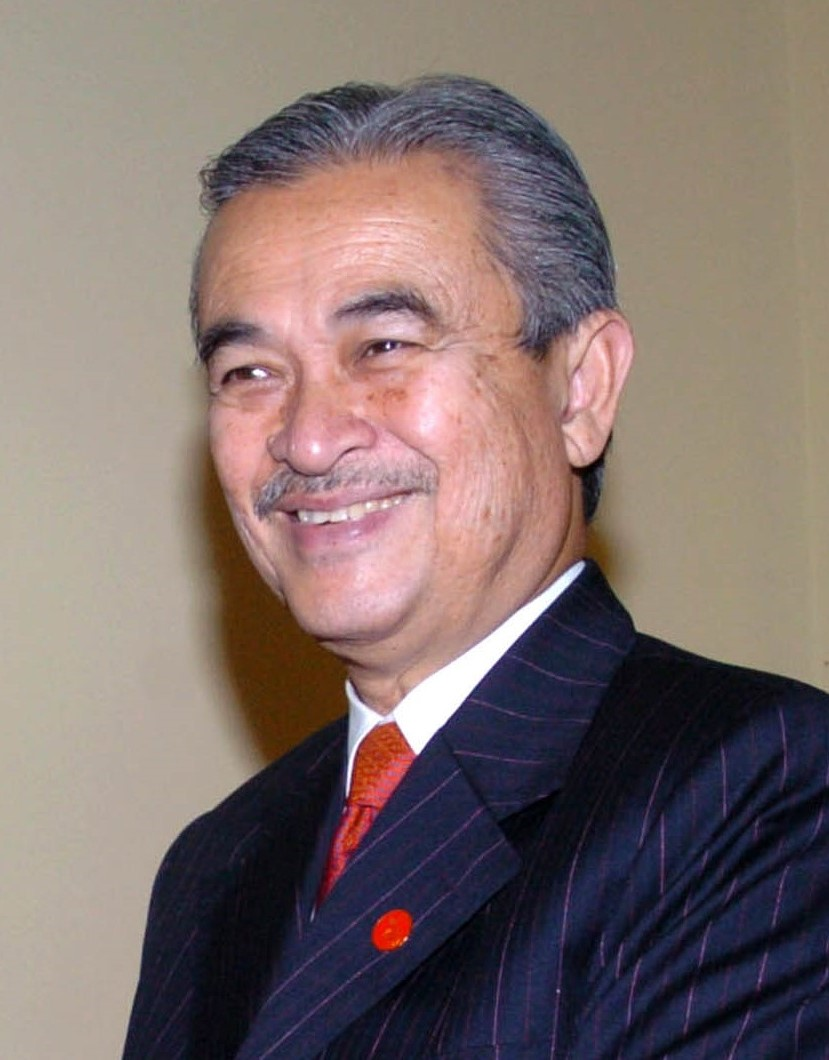
Abdullah Ahmad Badawi
Prime Minister of Malaysia
(Chairperson)

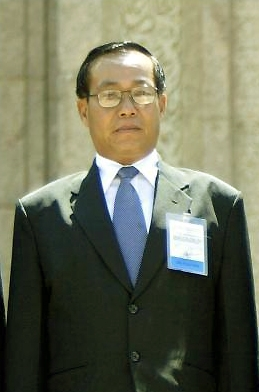
Soe Win
Prime Minister of Myanmar

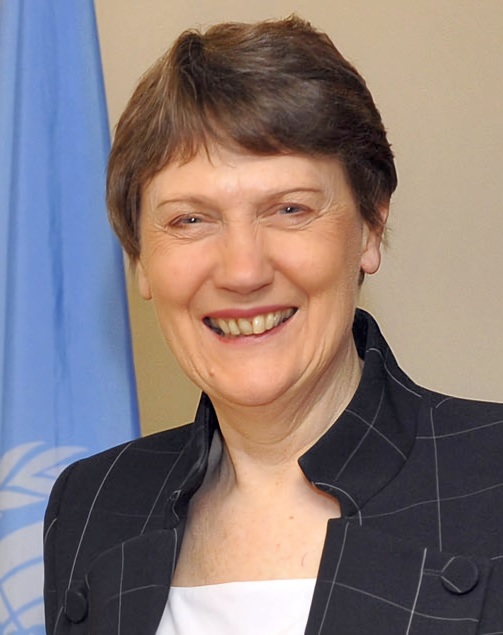
Helen Clark
Prime Minister of New Zealand

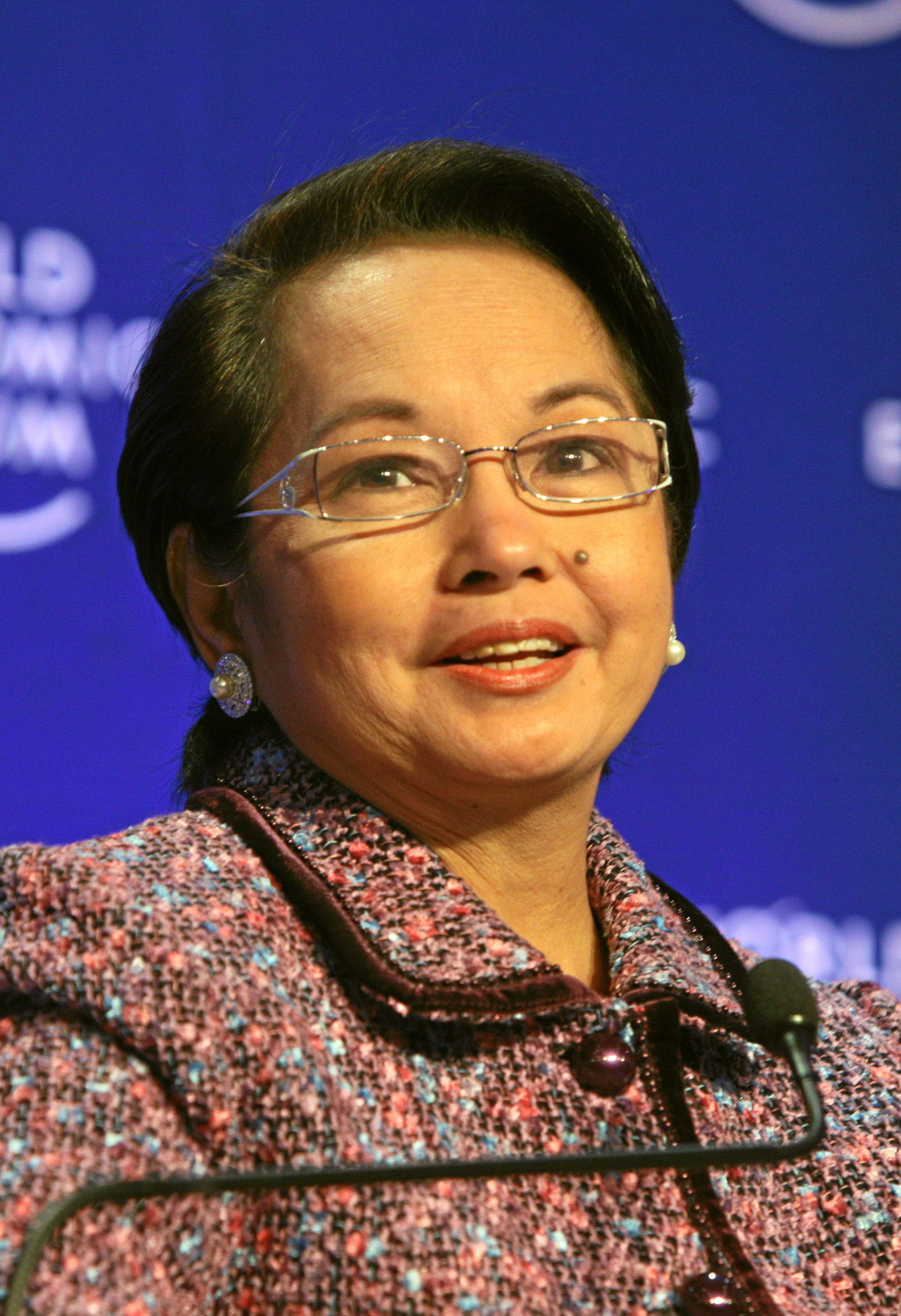
Gloria Macapagal Arroyo
President of the Philippines

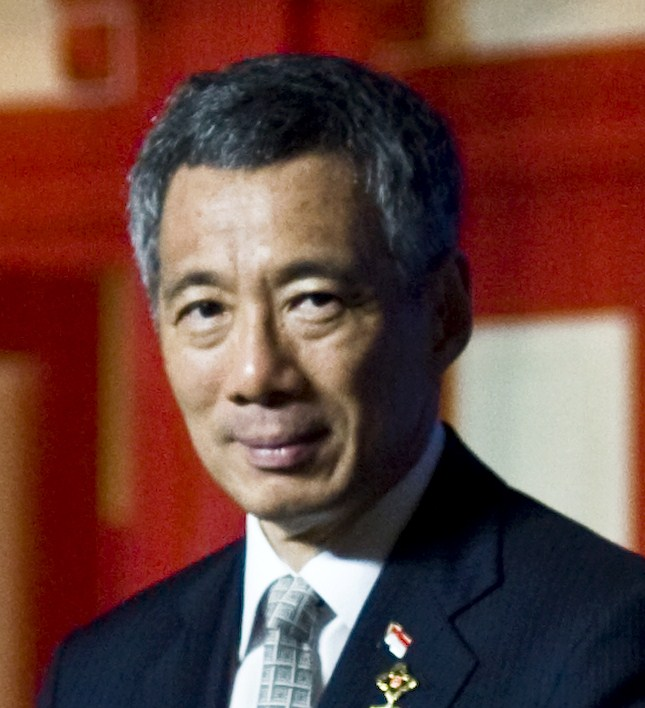
Lee Hsien Loong
Prime Minister of Singapore

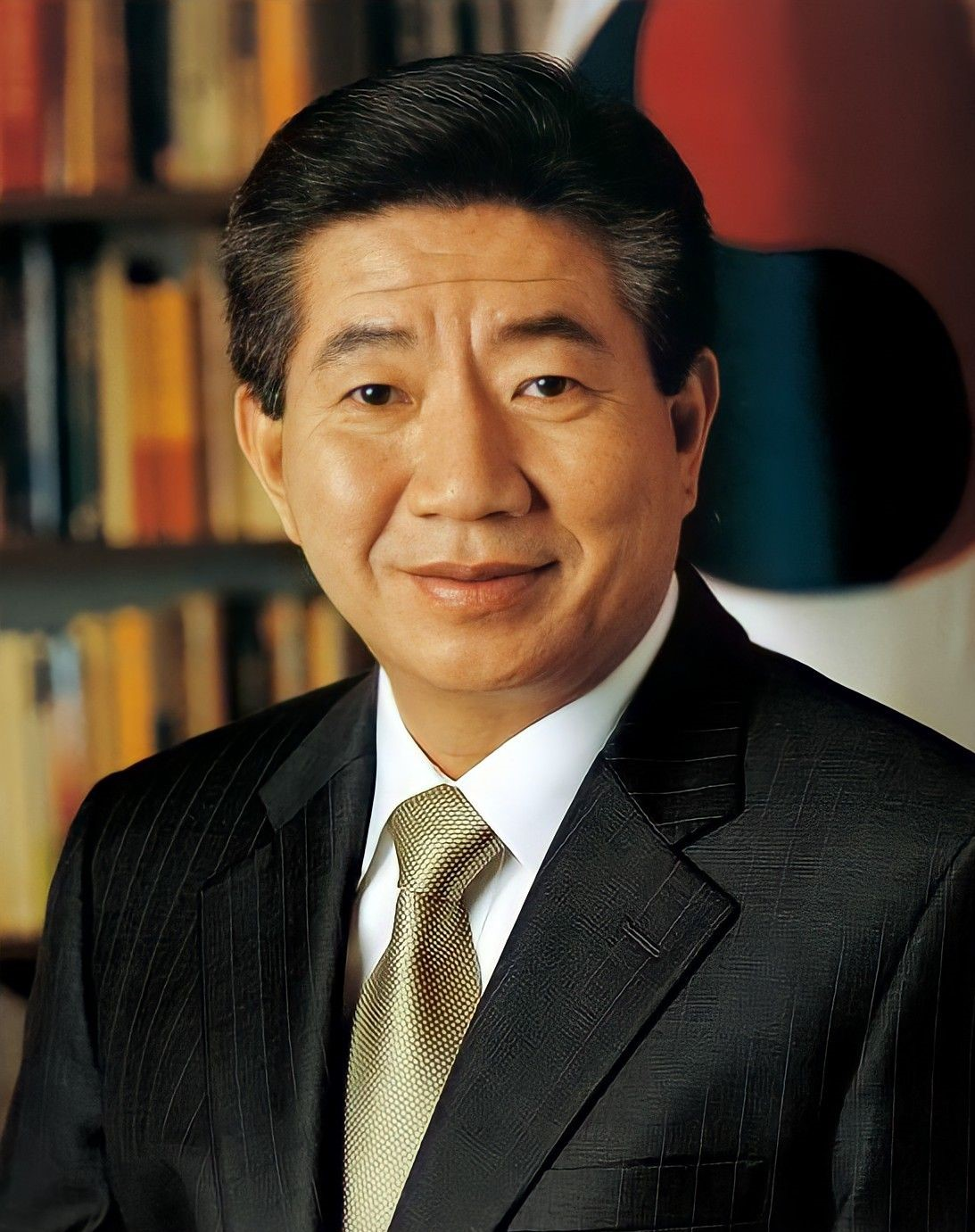
Roh Moo-hyun
President of South Korea

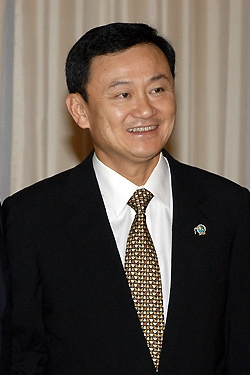
Thaksin Shinawatra
Prime Minister of Thailand

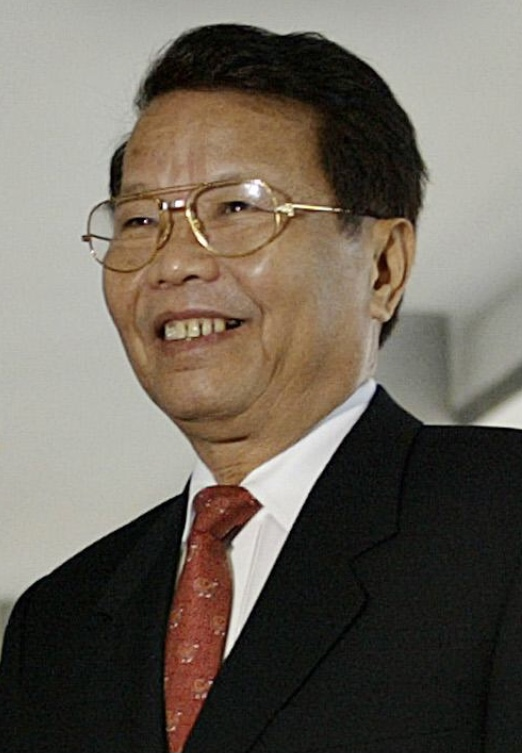
Tran Duc Luong
President of Vietnam
- observer
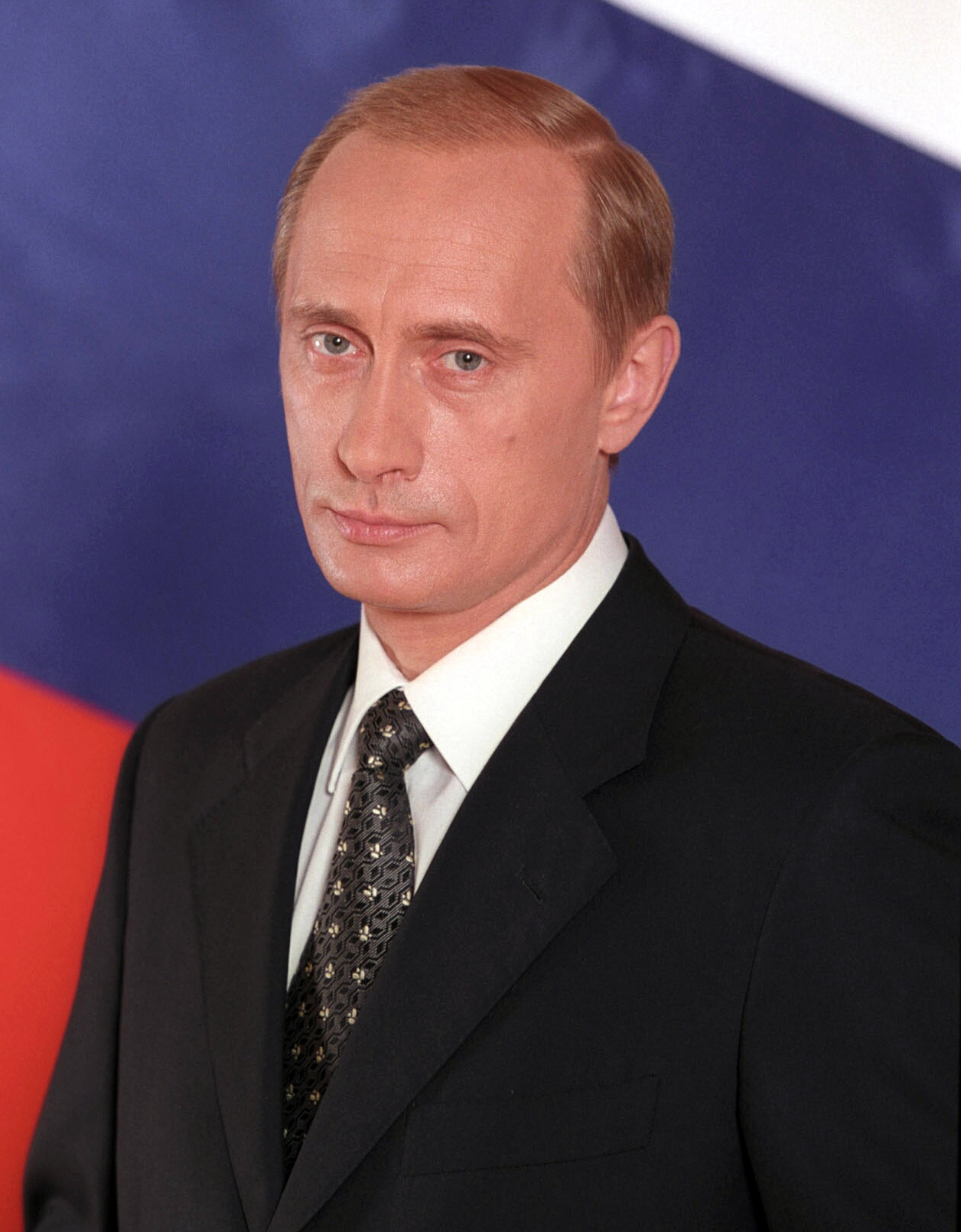
Vladimir Putin
President of Russia

== Issues relating to the first EAS ==
=== The presence of non-East Asian countries ===
While India is included in Asia it is normally identified as part of South Asia not East Asia. Australia and New Zealand are usually included in Oceania rather than Asia, although some differ and the distinction can be unclear, and they may be seen as part of the Asia Pacific.

The involvement of countries not seen as traditionally part of East Asia, especially Australia and New Zealand but to a lesser extent India as well, was seen as controversial by some. The inclusion of Australia and New Zealand was considered problematic as these nations were said to be neither geographically nor culturally part of Asia. Former Malaysian Prime Minister Mahathir Mohamad, credited with raising the idea of an East Asian caucus, was especially critical of the involvement of Australia and New Zealand.

Australia's presence was only confirmed after Australia reversed its previous policy and agreed to accede to ASEAN's Treaty of Amity and Cooperation in Southeast Asia.

The presence of India was met by "quiet resistance" from China. This stance may have reflected, in part, the perception that the presence of India would act to lessen Chinese influence in the EAS, as discussed further below.

Although not strictly East Asian all three countries did have a notable history with ASEAN. In 1974 Australia became ASEAN's first dialogue partner. New Zealand became a dialogue partner in the following year, 1975. Summits with ASEAN for both countries were first held in 1977.

It has been suggested that the final membership of the EAS represents an "anti-region", supplied to prevent the emergence of a regional community in Asian East Asia, rather than a region.

Australia and New Zealand as the two Closer Economic Relations (CER) countries have also developed close ties with ASEAN and have been negotiating a CER-ASEAN free trade agreement since 2004.

The linkages between ASEAN and India are more recent. India did not become a full ASEAN dialogue partner until 1995. Nevertheless, India's "look East" policy has placed particular emphasis on building relationships in the Asian region.

=== Koizumi's visits to the Yasukuni Shrine ===
Japan–China and Japan–South Korea ties were strained ahead of the first Summit because of Japanese Prime Minister Junichiro Koizumi controversial visits to the Yasukuni shrine, which honors 14 war criminals alongside Japan's other fallen soldiers. These visits are perceived by China and South Korea as symptomatic of a Japan that has not come to terms with its role in World War II, a conclusion disputed by Japan.

The most recent (at the time) visit by Prime Minister Koizumi was on 17 October 2005, so the issue was still fresh by the EAS in December. As a result, the traditional Japan–China–South Korea meeting on the sidelines of the ASEAN Plus Three meeting (which preceded the EAS) was cancelled by China and South Korea.

=== The rise of China and the need to check Chinese influence ===
The presence of the non-East Asian India, and to a lesser extent Australia and New Zealand, was seen by some as an attempt by some members of ASEAN (such as Singapore, Indonesia and the Philippines) to include countries who by their size or economies may act as a check to the rising influence of China, especially as the weakness in Sino-Japanese relations undermined the ability of Japan to perform that role.

China has attributed the presence of Australia and India to Japanese influence.

=== The absence of the United States of America ===
The absence of the United States of America was seen by some commentators as symptomatic of what was said to be the USA's declining influence in Asia. Some view this as linked with what is perceived as Chinese influence rising.

== Outcome of the first EAS ==
The difficulties in the relationship between the "Plus Three" members (i.e. Japan, China and South Korea) of ASEAN Plus three together with the positioning of parties due to the presence of the non-East Asian countries, India, Australia and New Zealand, resulted in limitations in what could be achieved at the inaugural EAS. The role of the inaugural EAS then became a confidence building and familiarisation exercise.

The Kuala Lumpur declaration and the Avian Influenza Prevention, Control and Response declaration were signed by the 16 leaders during the first EAS.

It was agreed to hold future EASs in conjunction with the annual ASEAN meetings.

The outcomes that were achieved are summarised in the Chairman's Statement of the First East Asia Summit.

== Second EAS ==
The Second East Asia Summit was scheduled for the Philippines.
