= Second East Asia Summit =

- Host country: Philippines
- Date: 15 January 2007
- Cities: Mandaue, Metro Cebu
- Participants: EAS members
- Follows: First East Asia Summit
- Precedes: Third East Asia Summit

The Second East Asia Summit was held in Mandaue, Metro Cebu, Philippines on 15 January 2007. The East Asia Summit (EAS) is a pan-Asia forum held annually by the leaders of 16 countries in the East Asian region. EAS meetings are held after annual ASEAN leaders' meetings.

== Attending delegations ==
The Second East Asia Summit was to be held on 13 December 2006, in Mandaue, Metro Cebu, Philippines. After the confidence building of the First East Asia Summit, the 2006 East Asia Summit was to intended help to define the future role of the EAS, its relationship with ASEAN Plus Three and the involvement of Russia in EAS. However, in the face of Tropical Typhoon Utor the summit was postponed until January 2007. It has been rescheduled for 15 January 2007, approximately a month after the original scheduled date.

The 16 countries involved were:

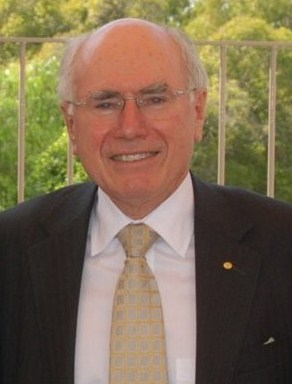
John Howard
Prime Minister of Australia

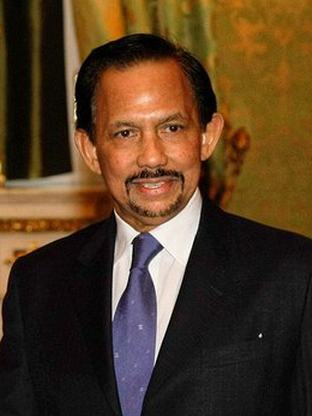
Hassanal Bolkiah
Sultan & Prime Minister of Brunei

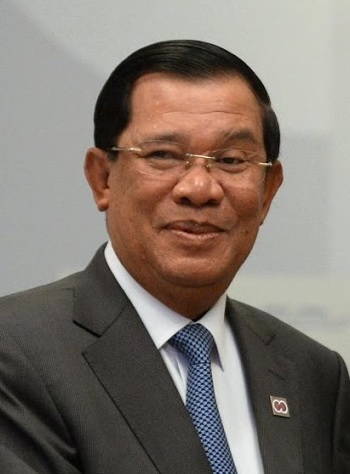
Hun Sen
Prime Minister of Cambodia

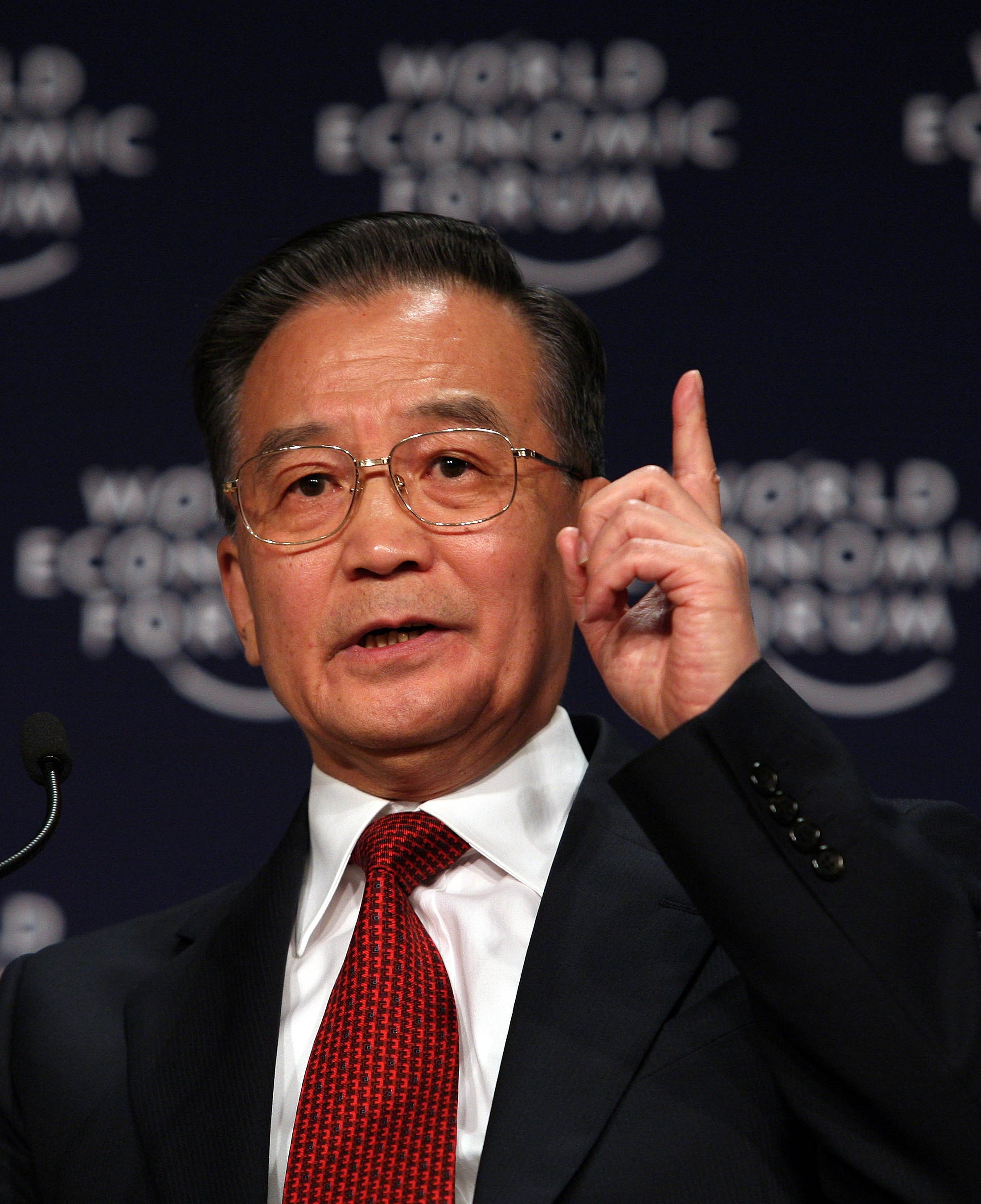
Wen Jiabao
Premier of China

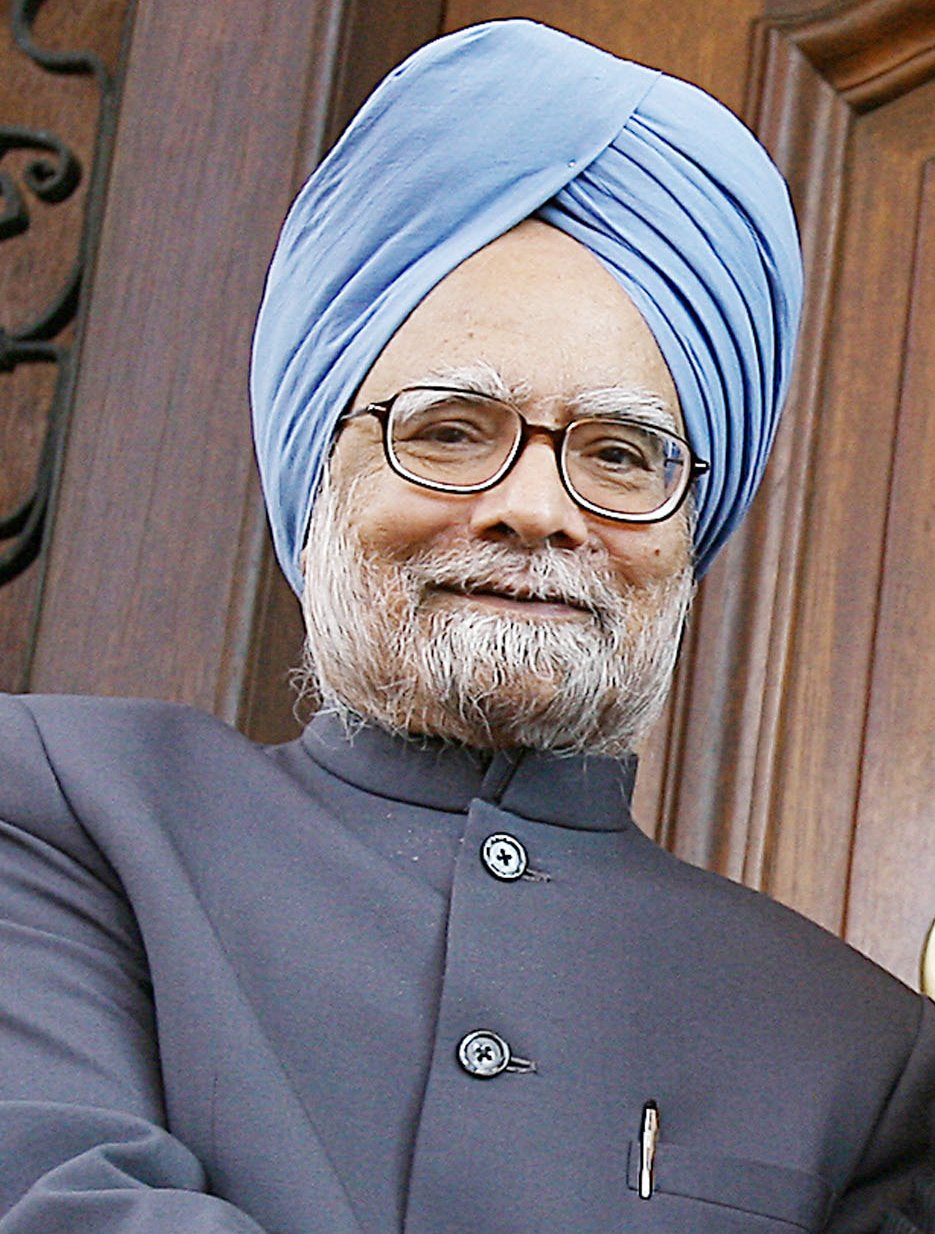
Manmohan Singh
Prime Minister of India

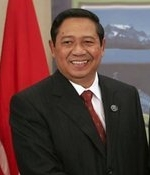
Susilo Bambang Yudhoyono
President of Indonesia

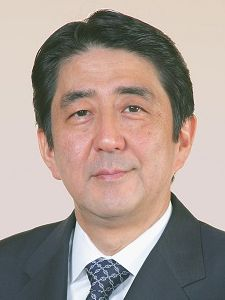
Shinzō Abe
Prime Minister of Japan

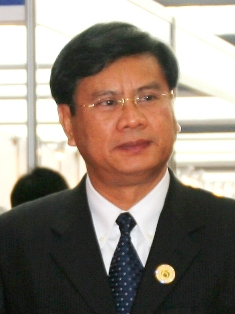
Bouasone Bouphavanh
Prime Minister of Laos

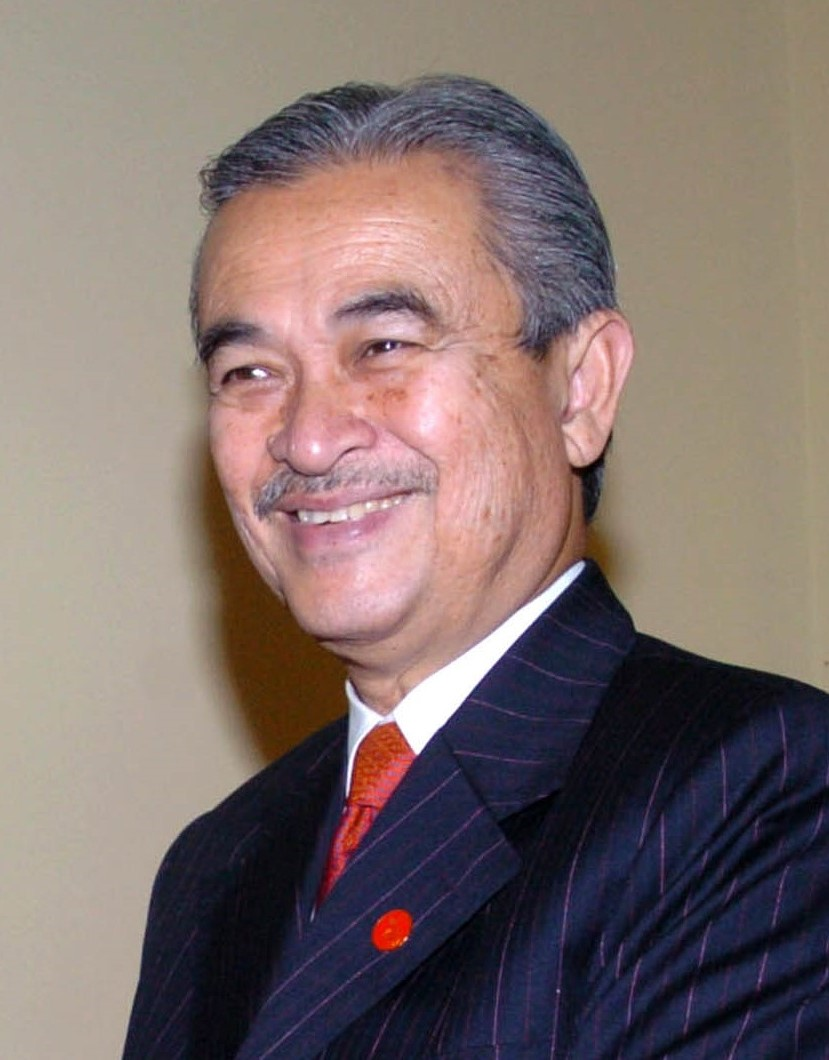
Abdullah Ahmad Badawi
Prime Minister of Malaysia

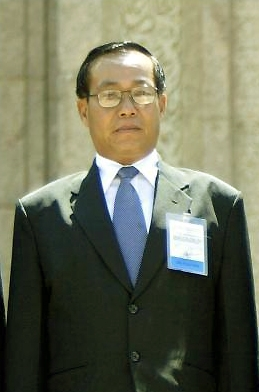
Soe Win
Prime Minister of Myanmar

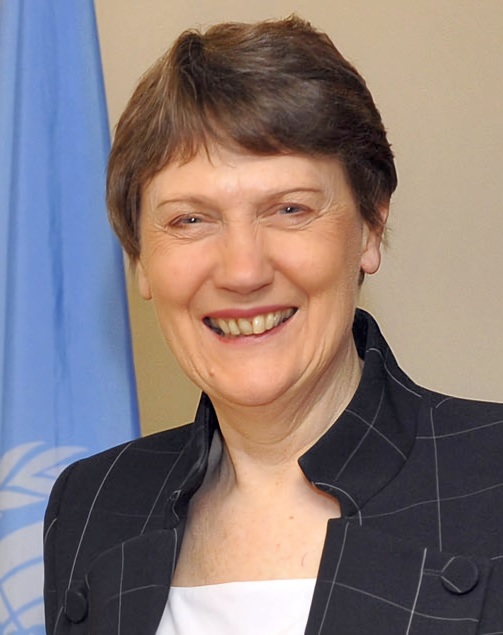
Helen Clark
Prime Minister of New Zealand

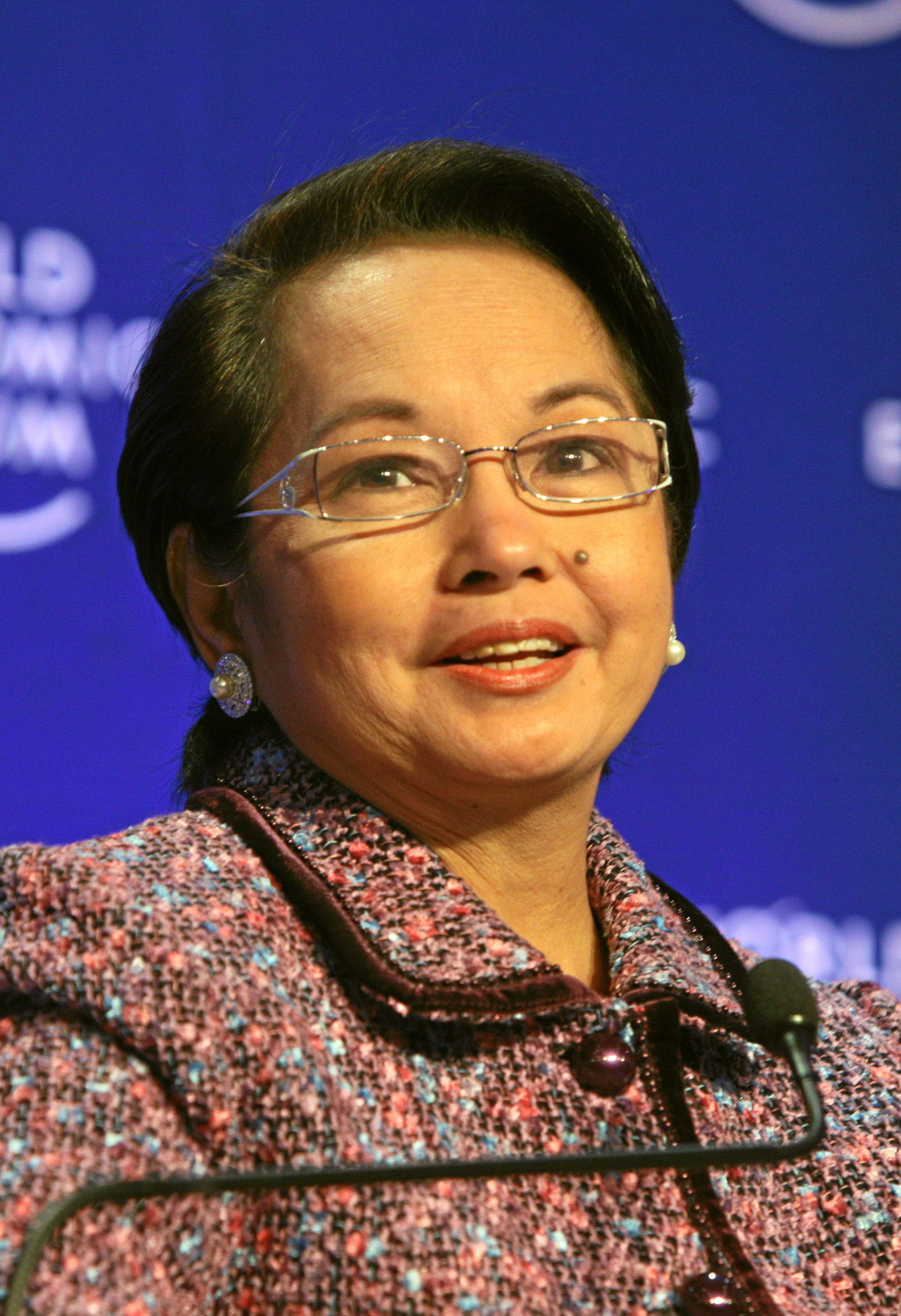
Gloria Macapagal Arroyo
President of the Philippines
(Chairperson)

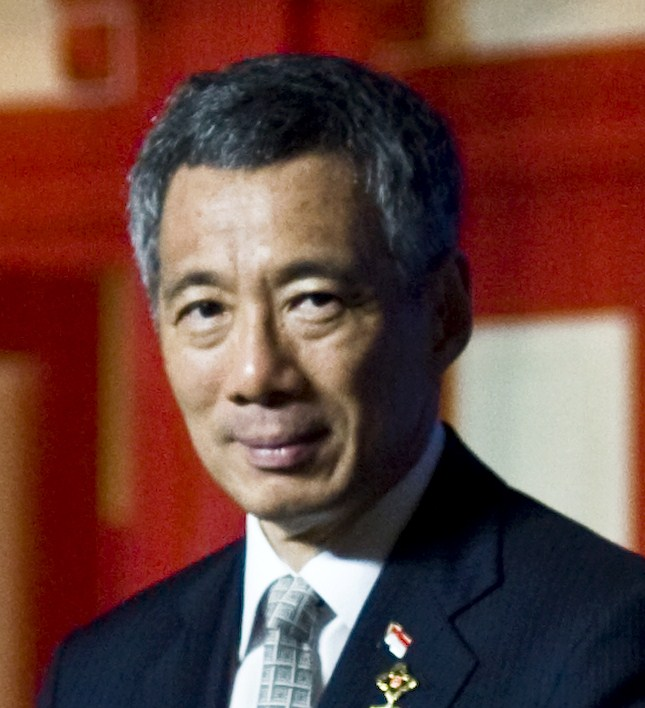
Lee Hsien Loong
Prime Minister of Singapore

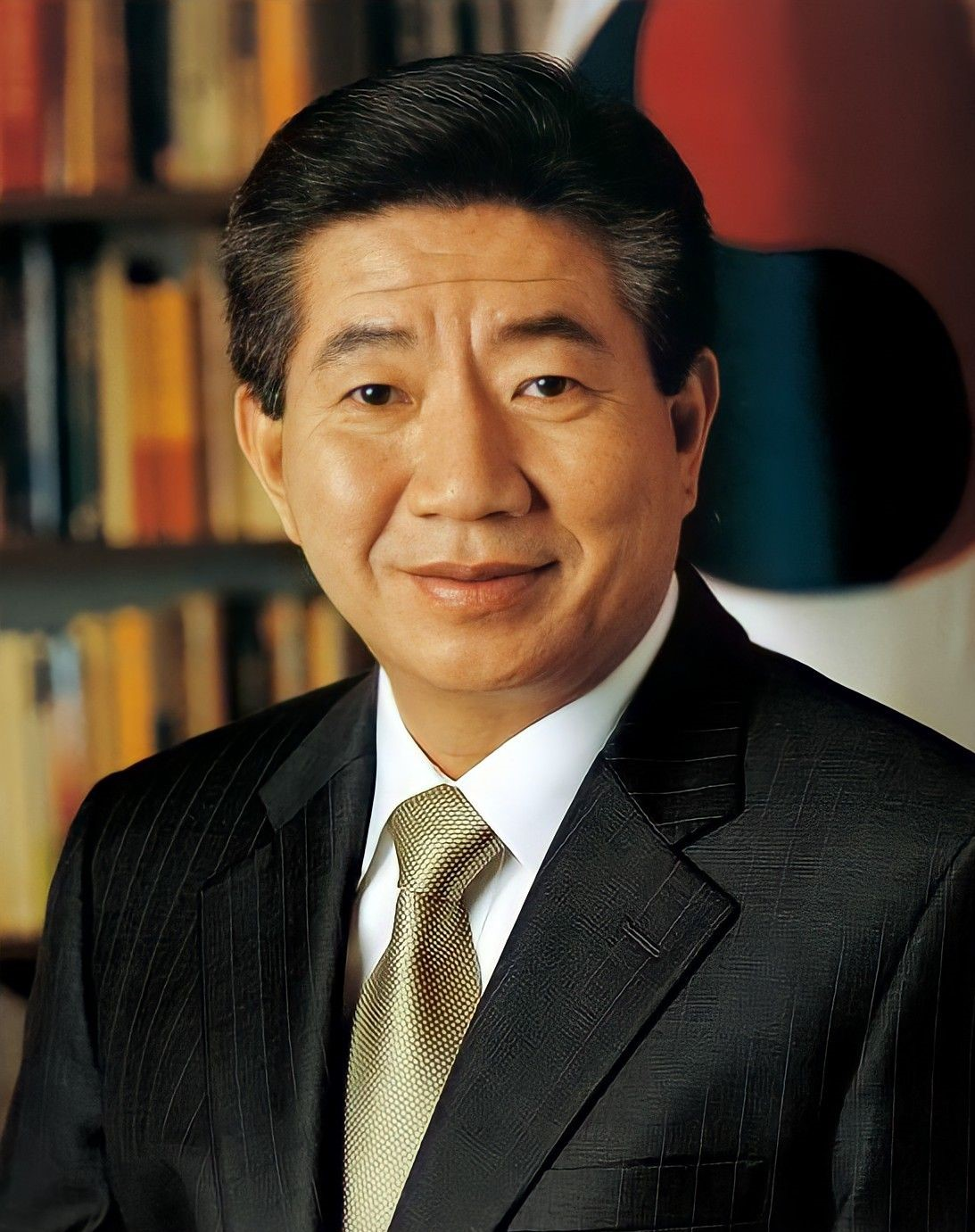
Roh Moo-hyun
President of South Korea

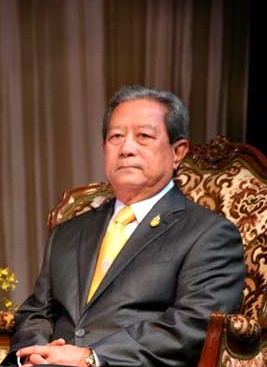
Surayud Chulanont
Prime Minister of Thailand

== Issues for the second EAS ==
The meeting of EAS foreign ministers in Kuala Lumpur on 26 July 2006, identified energy, finance, education, avian flu and national disaster mitigation as the priority issues for the 2006 EAS. The Philippines, the host of the 2006 (now 2007) EAS, also said the failure of the Doha Round would be on the agenda.

=== EAS Free Trade Agreement/Comprehensive Economic Partnership for East Asia (CEPEA) ===
In April 2006 Japan announced a proposal for an East Asian Economic Partnership Agreement (also known as the Comprehensive Economic Partnership for East Asia (CEPEA) or the Nikai Initiative in reference to Toshihiro Nikai in reference to the then Japanese Economic Minister) consisting of the current members of the EAS. Japan, the promoter of the concept, described it as an "East Asia OECD". Initially this was linked with a timetable for discussions to commence in 2008 and to conclude in 2010, which met with some scepticism.

By August 2006 this had been refined to a Japanese proposal championed by Japanese Trade Minister Toshihiro Nikai consisting of:

- a fund of US$80 million to $100 million to initiate a comprehensive economic partnership (CEP) with East Asia, modelled on the OECD; and
- an institution to be named the East Asia Economic Research Institute for ASEAN and East Asia (ERIA) in an ASEAN country to research the benefits of a proposed Free Trade Agreement between the 16-members of the EAS; and
- an East Asian Free Trade Agreement (EAFTA) between the EAS members.

Responses were mixed. Following the discussions of EAS Foreign Minister in Kuala Lumpur on 26 July 2006, to establish the agenda for the second EAS, it appeared that the proposal as it then stood did not have sufficient support to be included as an agenda item for the second EAS. Although the Philippines, which was the host for the second EAS, said trade would be on the agenda but in terms of the then present difficulties with the Doha Round.

Nevertheless, even after the meeting of the EAS Foreign Ministers Japan appeared keen to continue to discuss the idea in terms of a Free Trade Agreement between the members of the EAS.

India came out publicly in support of a pan-Asia Free Trade Agreement. New Zealand expressed its support. As has Malaysia. Australia described the proposal as "interesting". Indonesia gave guarded support to the proposal, linking it with the proposed East Asian Community and Asian Values. ASEAN gave its support to the Japanese proposal to research the proposed EAFTA.

Ong Keng Yong, the secretary-general of ASEAN has suggested that "it can be done", referring to an EAFTA, and estimated it would take 10 years. ASEAN as a whole seemed to have a pessimistic view as to the feasibility of the idea at 2006.

Japan nevertheless said it was delighted with the positive response to the proposal.

Nevertheless, China, South Korea and ASEAN were also said to have indirectly expressed scepticism about the idea. The difficulties with the ASEAN – India FTA does not augur well for a larger FTA. Japan also had to defend itself from the allegation that the proposal was advanced as a mechanism to counter China

The position of China was expected by some commentators although not all agreed. China appears to prefer the narrower grouping of ASEAN plus Three for a future Free Trade Agreement. New Zealand has expressed confidence that China will support the proposal, especially if the research shows a benefit to East Asia from an EAFTA

The United States of America has proposed an FTA within the members of APEC which may be in response to the suggestion of an FTA between the members of the EAS. Japan has suggested that the EAFTA could be used as a building block for the larger APEC FTA. The US is aggressively coming out against such a move concerned about a line down the middle of the Pacific while Asian economies are concerned about the US's ability to deliver a broad based FTA.

In September 2006 Toshihiro Nikai was replaced as Minister of Economy, Trade and Industry (Japan) by Akira Amari. Nikai's successor has pursued the Nikai initiative – Comprehensive Economic Partnership for East Asia (CEPEA).

=== Growth in India and China ties and the Japanese thaw ===
In November 2006 India and China announced plans to double bilateral trade by 2010. The growing relationship between the world's two most populous nations was seen as a potential source of stability and co-operation for the region. The two countries joint declaration of 21 November 2006, agreed at paragraph 43 to "cooperate closely" in the context of the EAS.

Further the change in leadership in Japan with Shinzo Abe's election to the Prime Ministership of Japan in September 2006 brought about some thawing in Japan's relationship with both China and South Korea.

These changes suggested the potential for different dynamics in the second EAS to the tensions in the First EAS.

=== Fuel stockpiles ===
It is proposed that an agreement to standardise rules for bio-fuels and agreements on stockpiling fuels will form part of the 2006 EAS.

== Outcome of the second EAS ==
The outcomes are summarised in the Statement of the Second East Asia Summit.

=== Energy ===
The EAS members signed the Cebu Declaration on East Asian Energy Security, a declaration on energy security and biofuels containing statement for members to prepare, non-binding, targets.

=== Trade and the Comprehensive Economic Partnership for East Asia (CEPEA) ===
As to trade and regional integration the following was noted in the Chair's report:

12. We welcomed ASEAN's efforts towards further integration and community building, and reaffirmed our resolve to work closely together in narrowing development gaps in our region. We reiterated our support for ASEAN's role as the driving force for economic integration in this region. To deepen integration, we agreed to launch a Track Two study on a Comprehensive Economic Partnership in East Asia (CEPEA) among EAS participants. We tasked the ASEAN Secretariat to prepare a time frame for the study and to invite all our countries to nominate their respective participants in it.

We welcomed Japan's proposal for an Economic Research Institute for ASEAN and East Asia (ERIA).

According to some press reports the debate as to whether there will be a trade grouping based on ASEAN Plus 3 or the EAS.

The United States has subsequently stated that it opposes any trade group in the region not involving itself. The preference of the United States appears to be a trading group based on APEC.

The reality appears however that movement towards such a relationship is a long way-off. Lee Kuan Yew has compared the relationship between Southeast Asia and India with that of the European Community and Turkey, and has suggested that a free-trade area involving South-East Asia and India is 30 to 50 years away.

=== ERIA ===
The members of EAS agreed to study the Japanese proposed Comprehensive Economic Partnership for East Asia (CEPEA). As noted above the second EAS welcomed the Economic Research Institute for ASEAN and East Asia (ERIA). The ERIA as an institute that is envisaged as a network of think-tanks to drive the study required.

It was subsequently announced that the ERIA would be established in November 2007.
