= Third East Asia Summit =

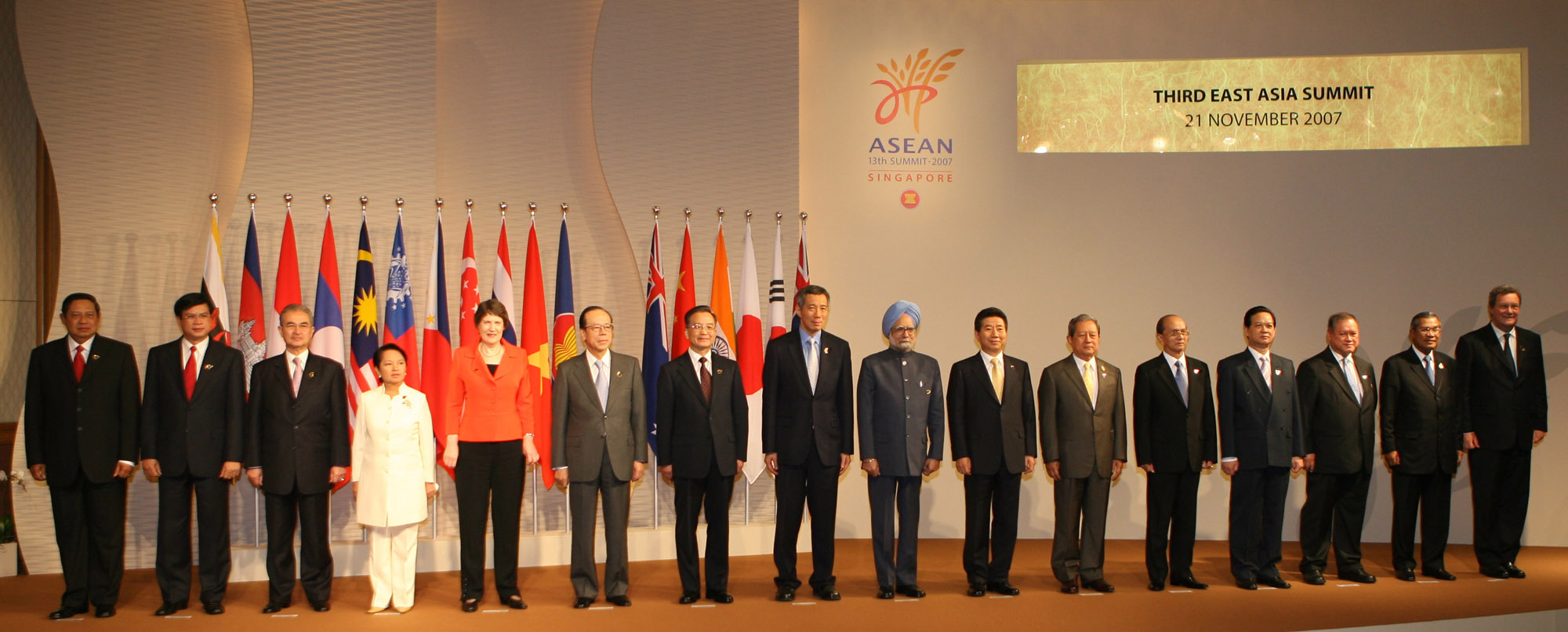
- family picture
- Host country: Singapore
- Date: November 21, 2007
- Participants: EAS members
- Follows: Second East Asia Summit
- Precedes: Fourth East Asia Summit

The Third East Asia Summit was held in Singapore on November 21, 2007. The East Asia Summit (EAS) is a pan-Asia forum held annually by the leaders of 16 countries in the East Asian region. EAS meetings are held after annual ASEAN leaders' meetings.

== Attending delegations ==
The 16 countries involved are:

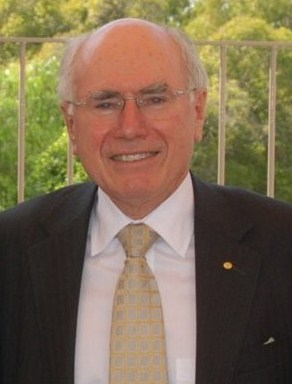
John Howard
Prime Minister of Australia

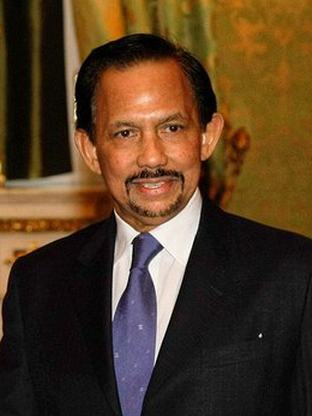
Hassanal Bolkiah
Sultan & Prime Minister of Brunei

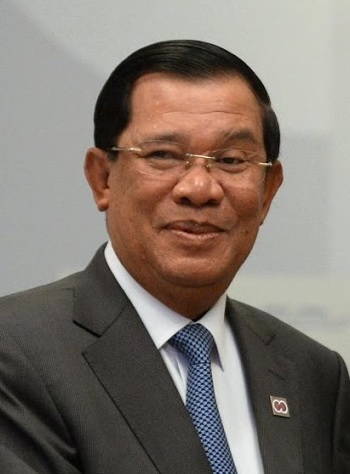
Hun Sen
Prime Minister of Cambodia

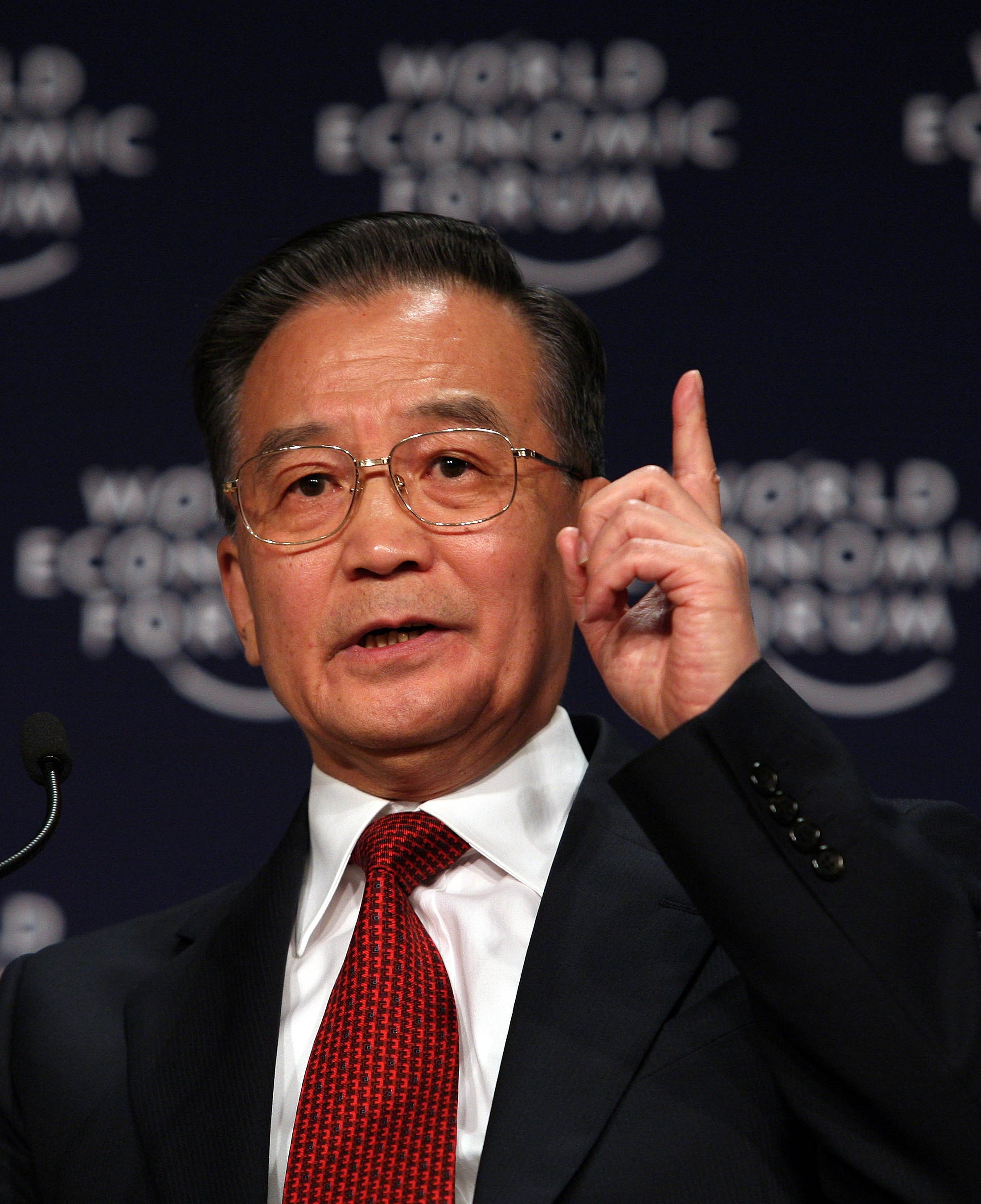
Wen Jiabao
Premier of China

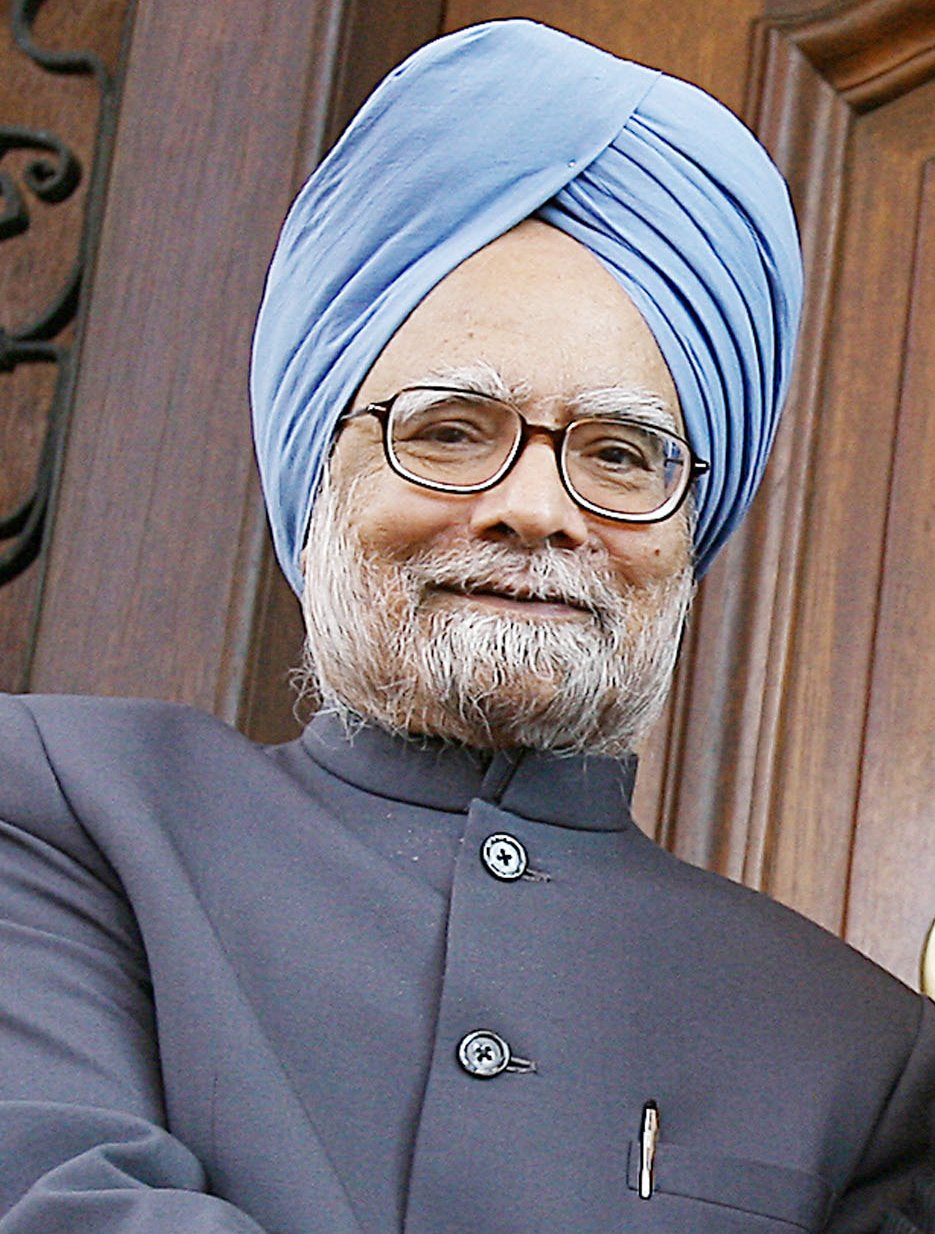
Manmohan Singh
Prime Minister of India

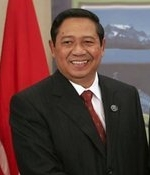
Susilo Bambang Yudhoyono
President of Indonesia

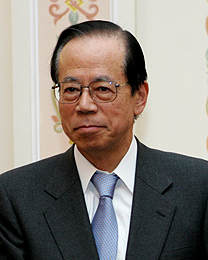
Yasuo Fukuda
Prime Minister of Japan

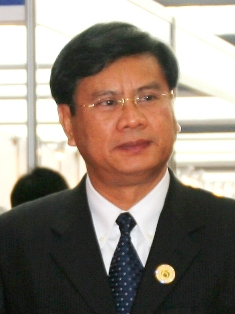
Bouasone Bouphavanh
Prime Minister of Laos

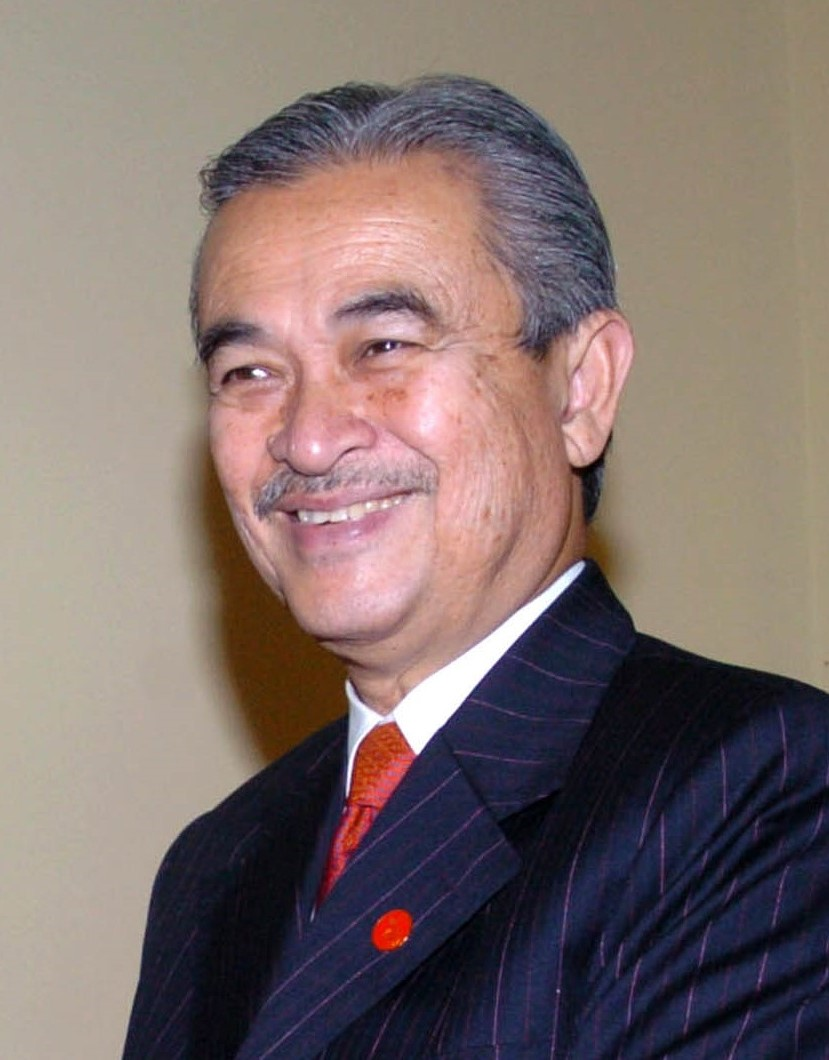
Abdullah Ahmad Badawi
Prime Minister of Malaysia

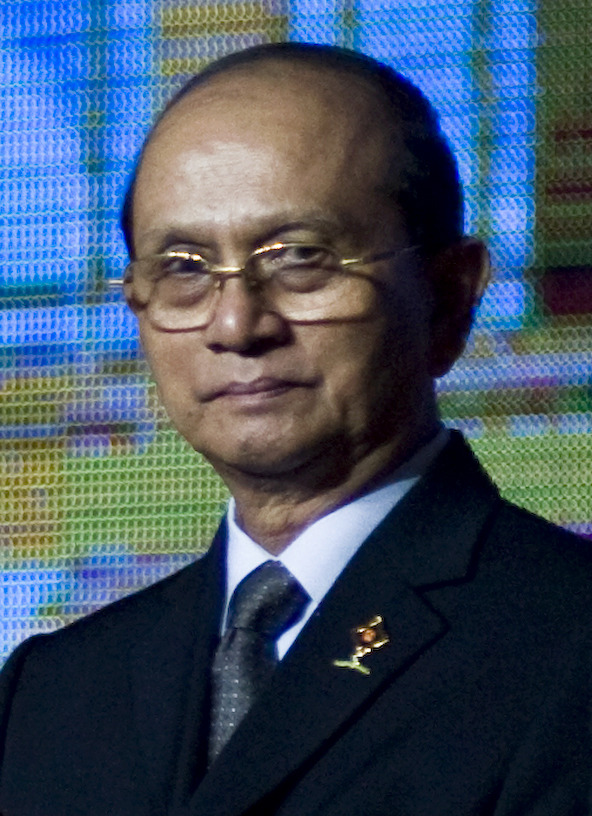
Thein Sein
Prime Minister of Myanmar

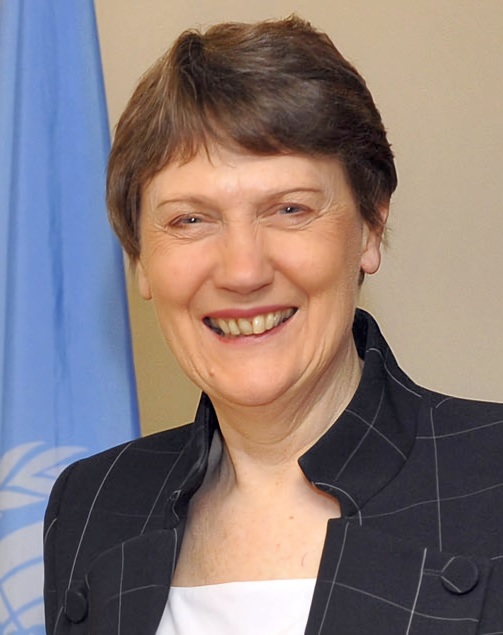
Helen Clark
Prime Minister of New Zealand

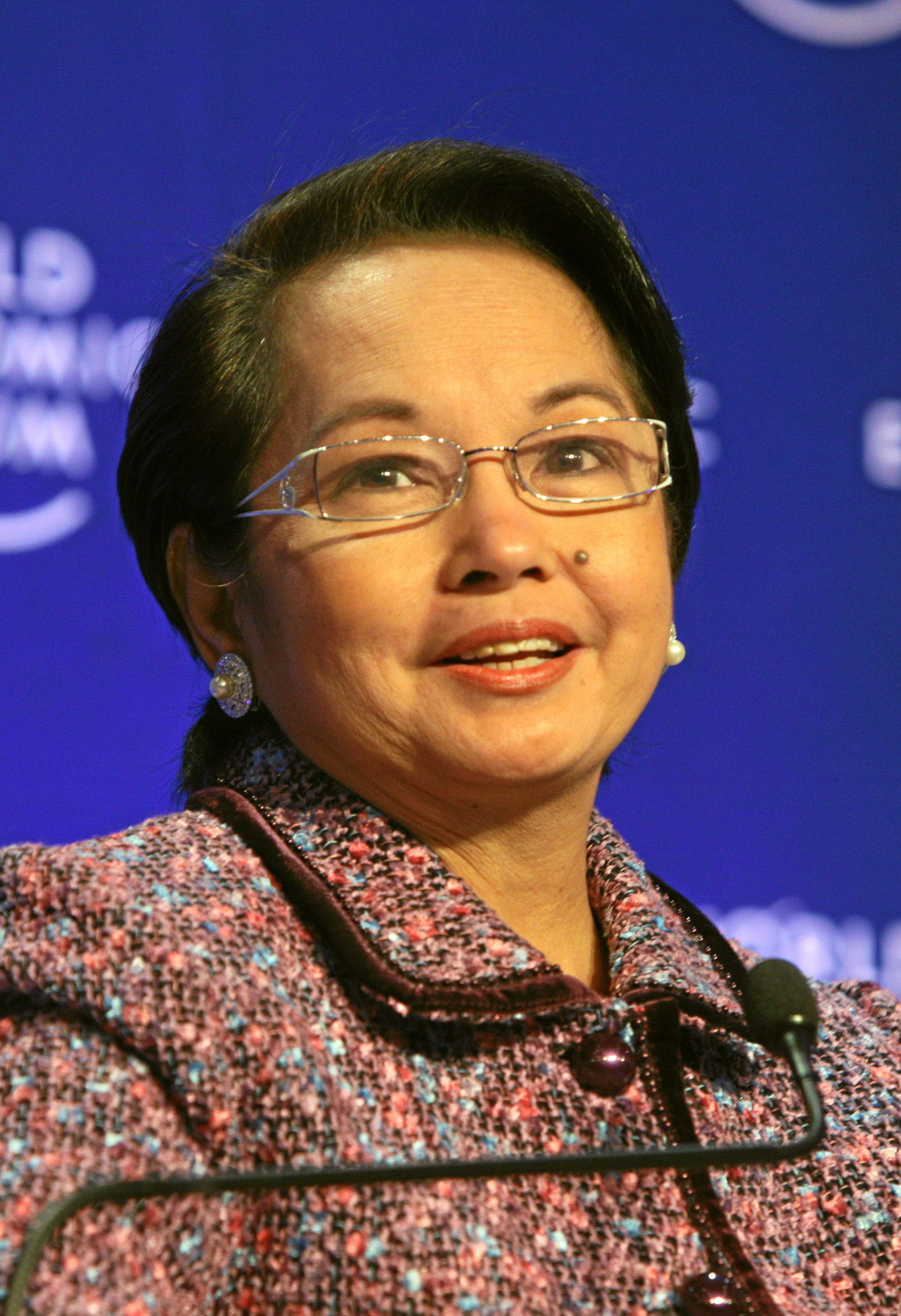
Gloria Macapagal Arroyo
President of the Philippines

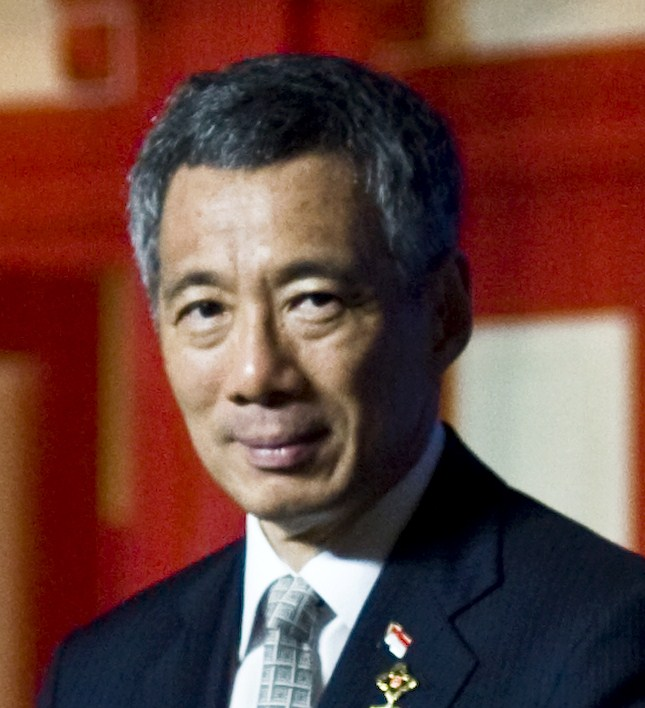
Lee Hsien Loong
Prime Minister of Singapore
(Chairperson)

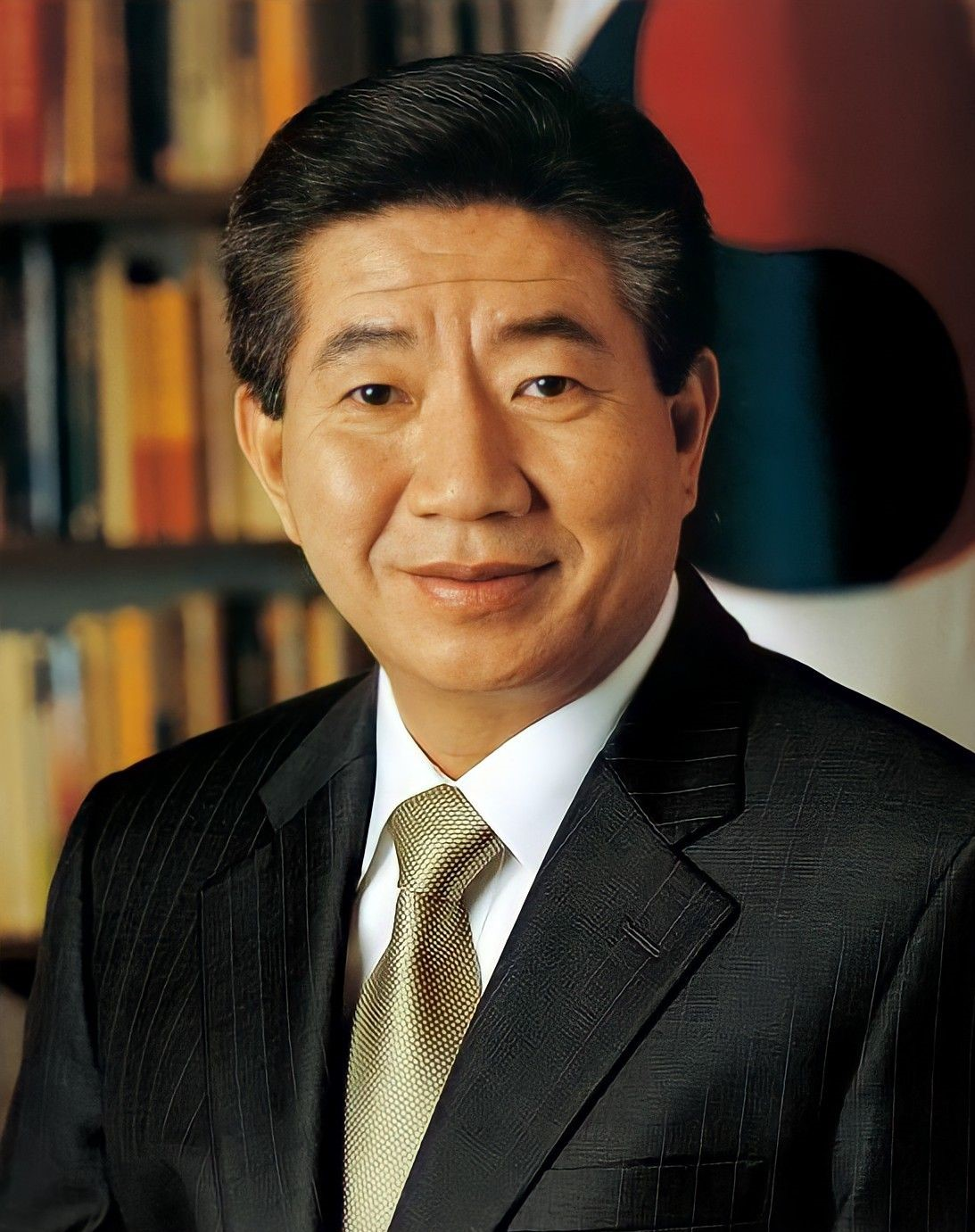
Roh Moo-hyun
President of South Korea

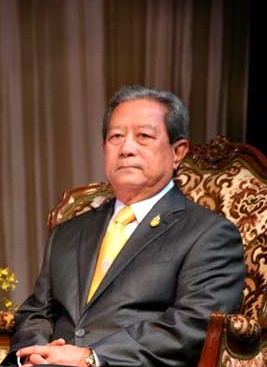
Surayud Chulanont
Prime Minister of Thailand

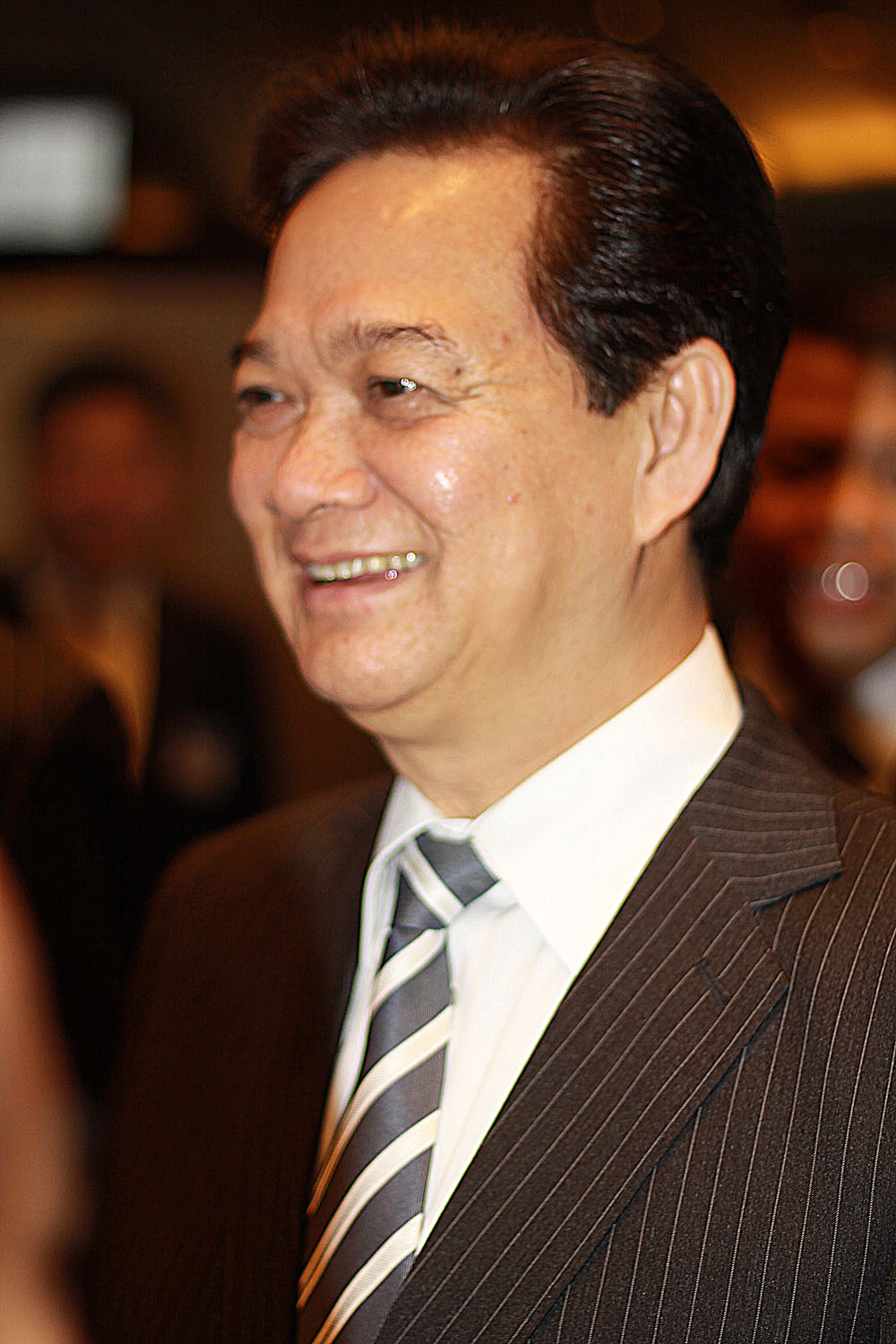
Nguyễn Tấn Dũng
Prime Minister of Vietnam

== Issues related to the third EAS ==
The outcomes are summarised in the Chairman's Statement of the 3rd East Asia Summit Singapore, 21 November 2007.

=== Myanmar ===
The issue of Myanmar or Burma, following the 2007 Myanmar anti-government protests, was to be on the agenda for the third EAS It was originally suggested that the UN Secretary-General's Special Advisor Dr. Ibrahim Gambari has been invited to brief the leaders at the summit. However, following the ASEAN Summit the preceding day a pressure from Myanmar, ASEAN decided that Dr. Gambari will not brief the leaders but rather Burmese Prime Minister Thein Sein will address the ASEAN Summit and ASEAN would facilitate briefings with other interested parties. Dr. Gambari was available for private briefings of the leaders.

=== Climate change ===
The third EAS was expected to make an announcement on tackling climate change. At the Summit the Singapore Declaration on Climate Change, Energy and the Environment was signed establishing aspirational targets on climate change, energy and the environment.

=== Trade ===
The Summit agreed to receive at the Fourth EAS the further report on the Comprehensive Economic Partnership in East Asia (CEPEA) proposed at the Second EAS.

The Summit also agreed to the establishment of the Economic Research Institute for ASEAN and East Asia (ERIA).

The Chairman's Statement of the 3rd East Asia Summit Singapore, 21 November 2007 said:

13. We agreed to the establishment of the Economic Research Institute of ASEAN and East Asia (ERIA) to be accommodated temporarily at the ASEAN Secretariat. We welcomed the report submitted to us by the Expert Group, which focuses on research topics of strategic interest to the EAS countries. We encouraged the Expert Group to continue its research work and we looked forward to practical policy recommendations to further regional integration and strengthen partnerships in East Asia.

14. We welcomed the progress report of the study by scholars and academics on a Comprehensive Economic Partnership in East Asia (CEPEA), and encouraged them to maintain good momentum in their work towards submitting a final report of recommendations through the Economic Ministers to us at the 4th East Asia Summit. It would be useful to incorporate the views of the private sector in the work process. The CEPEA should build upon and add value to our existing FTAs. We encouraged the expeditious conclusion of our ASEAN Plus 1 FTAs.

== Subsequent to the meeting ==
Japan and China subsequently agreed in December 2007 to:

enhance cooperation in East Asia regional economic integration, including the East Asian Free Trade Agreement (EAFTA), Comprehensive Economic Partnership in East Asia (CEPEA), and Research Institute for ASEAN and East Asia
