= Project 404 =

Covert United States Air Force advisory mission to Laos

- Patuxay, was built in Vientiane during the 1960s with USAID funds awarded for building a new airport runway. Humorously renamed the "Vertical Runway" by U.S. mission personnel.
- Operational scope: Diplomatic Military Attachés; Strategic
- Planned by: United States Department of State; CIA
- Objective: Counterinsurgency; Foreign internal defense
- Date: 1966–1973
- Executed by: U.S. Army Attachés; U.S. Air Force Attachés; Air America
- Outcome: North Vietnamese Army and Pathet Lao Conquest of Royal Lao Government 1975

Project 404 was the code name for a covert United States Air Force advisory mission to Laos during the Laotian Civil War, as part of the Vietnam War. The purpose of the mission was to supply the line crew technicians needed to support and train the Royal Laotian Air Force, while Raven Forward Air Controllers were brought in to supply piloting expertise and guidance for running a tactical air force. The two programs together comprised Palace Dog.

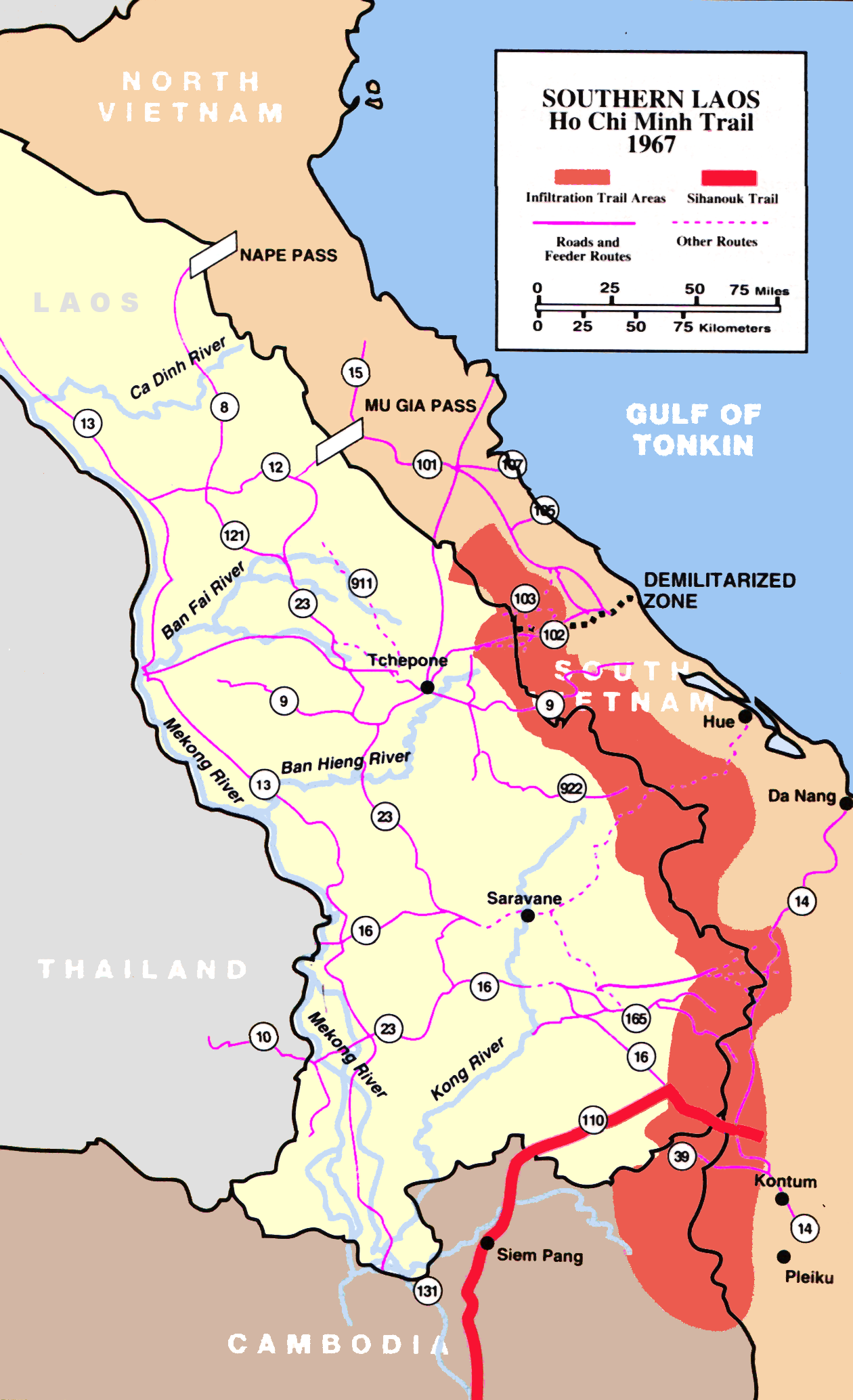
The Ho Chi Minh Trail running through Laos, 1967

Project 404 began in 1966, as a successor after the completion of Operation White Star, was narrower in scope, and was an adjunct to the various covert ground operations succeeding White Star. Because Laos was ostensibly a neutral party to the conflict between the United States and North Vietnam, the airmen did not wear United States Air Force uniforms, but instead worked in civilian clothing.

== Program ==
=== Background ===
Following the signing of the International Agreement on the Neutrality of Laos in 1962, American troops were withdrawn from Laos; however, as part of the American geopolitical strategy of containment, the United States wished to retain covert forces in the country.

By 1964, temporary military personnel based out of Thailand were providing assistance to the Royal Lao Air Force in the Laotian Civil War as part of Project Waterpump, training Lao pilots and setting up Air Operations Centers; however, as due to the 1962 agreement these personnel officially were on temporary duty assignment as diplomatic attachés, they were required to commute to and from Thailand, resulting in some logistical difficulties.

=== Mission ===
Project 404 was established on May 5, 1966, by the United States Joint Chiefs of Staff to provide a permanent operating framework for support of the RLAF. 117 military personnel and 5 civilians under the de facto command of the American ambassador in Vientiane were assigned to the initial deployment of Project 404 in October 1966, assisting the RLAF with aircraft maintenance, personnel training, and military communications.

In 1971, coinciding with American intentions to begin withdrawing from Southeast Asia, Project 404 personnel took on the additional duty of reorganising the Royal Lao Armed Forces (Forces Armées du Royaume, or FAR) along American lines. Over the next three years, personnel established three regional training centers in addition to conducting reconnaissance and planting sensors until March 1973.

Project 404 was concluded in June 1974 as part of the American withdrawal from the country. Ultimately, the American-supported government capitulated to the Pathet Lao.

== See also ==
- First Indochina War
- Laotian Civil War (also known as the Secret War)
- Operation White Star
- Ho Chi Minh Trail
- North Vietnamese invasion of Laos
- Royal Lao Army
- Royal Lao Air Force
- Lieutenant Colonel Lee Lue
- Major General Vang Pao
- Vang Sue
- William H. Sullivan U.S. Ambassador
