= History of the Hmong in Fresno, California =

The Hmong are a major ethnic group in Fresno, California. The Fresno Hmong community, along with that of Minneapolis/St. Paul, is one of the largest two urban U.S. Hmong communities. As of 1993 the Hmong were the largest Southeast Asian ethnic group in Fresno. As of 2010, there are 24,328 people of Hmong descent living in Fresno, making up 4.9% of the city's population.

== History ==
Hmong American scholar Kou Yang stated that in 1977 Fresno had one Hmong family. According to Kou Yang, this increased to four in 1978 and five in 1979. In 1980 there were 2,000 Hmong in Fresno. In 1981 this increased to 7,000. In 1982 12,000 Hmong lived in Fresno. In 1989 there were about 26,000 Hmong in Fresno. As of 1993 there were about 35,000 Hmong in Fresno.

Many Hmong who arrived in Fresno lived on public assistance in public housing projects; they were unable to work in agriculture due to a lack of technical skills and English skills. About half of the Hmong who arrived in the 1980s wanted to work in agriculture but the percentage who remained interested decreased to 20% after arrival, and they had insufficient funds to make another move.

From 1998 to 2001, eight Hmong teenagers in Fresno committed suicide.

== Demographics ==
Mai Na Lee, the author of an encyclopedia article titled "Hmong of Minnesota and California," wrote circa 2013 that "The Fresno Hmong have the highest rate of poverty compared to those in other places."

== Economy ==
As of 2013 there were ten Hmong supermarkets in Fresno. Other Hmong businesses included financial service agencies, farms, video rental stores, medical offices, ranches, insurance companies, and chiropractic clinics.

== Politics ==
In 2002 Tony Vang received a school board position at the Fresno Unified School District. He was the first Hmong elected official in Fresno, and the first Hmong elected official in California. The Fresno Hmong had advocated for California bill AB78 which established a recommendation for Southeast Asian history education in the California school system; this bill passed in 2003. In 2006 Blong Xiong was elected to the Fresno City Council. He was the first Hmong person elected to a city council in California, and the first Asian elected to the Fresno City Council.

== Institutions ==
As of 2013 the Fresno Center for New Americans (FCNA), a Hmong nonprofit organization has a yearly budget of over $2 million and 40 employees. It helps to serve as one of the Hmong political and civil organs and assisted with the 2006 election of Blong Xiong to the Fresno City Council. Other Hmong nonprofit organizations include the Stone Soup Fresno, Fresno Interdenominational Refugee Ministries (FIRM), and Lao Family Community of Fresno.

== Media ==
As of 2013 Fresno has two Hmong radio stations.

The radio station KBIF 900 am, located in Fresno, airs programming oriented towards Hmong people. As of 2004 the station staff members state that 95% of the area Hmong community listens to the station.

Hmong Today airs on KIFR.

In 2011, HmongUSA TV was established to serve the Hmong Community as a local TV station broadcasting on Digital Antena 31.9. The Hmong TV station served the surrounding Fresno area to Delano and up to the Stockton, CA. As of 2021, HmongUSA TV became available to all Streaming Platform, and SmartTV, Roku, FireTV, AppleTV, etc. HmongUSA TV is currently streaming through UNISON app. and is the only International TV station offering 24 by 7 Hmong programs.

== Recreation ==
The Hmong New Year is celebrated in Fresno. The celebrations are held outdoors and collectively it is the largest Hmong New Year celebration in the United States. As of 2013 there are two separate celebrations, the Hmong International New Year at the Fresno Fairgrounds and another at Calwa Park in southeast Fresno. Col. Youa True Vang founded the Hmong International New Year, which has about 100,000 annual participants. The United Hmong Council organizes the celebration at Calwa Park, which has no admissions charge. As of 2013 about 1,500 participated in the UMC celebration.

The Hmong Music Festival (HMF) is celebrated in Fresno annually.

As of 1993 in order to avoid competing with Fresno's Hmong New Year celebrations, organizers outside of Fresno schedule the Hmong New Year celebrations on days different from Fresno's.

== Notable residents ==
- Vang Pao (general) and his wife, May Song Vang. Diana Aguilera of the Fresno Bee wrote that May Song Vang "became the face of the Hmong community" after Vang Pao died in 2011.
  - Vang Pao Elementary School of the Fresno Unified School District is named after Vang Pao.
  - During the Hmong New Year of 2013 a statue of Vang Pao was erected at the Fresno Fairgrounds. The statue is 6 feet (180 cm) tall and weighs over 1,000 pounds (450 kg). A smaller statue was dedicated in the 2011 Hmong New Year. The new statue, made by Monster City Studios of Fresno, replaced the older one.
- Wangyee Vang, National President, Founder and President of the Fresno-based Lao Veterans of America Institute, and President Emeritus of the Lao Veterans of America, the nation's largest Lao- and Hmong-American veterans organizations. Wangyee Vang helped to lead efforts in Washington, D.C., and Arlington National Cemetery to dedicate the Lao Veterans of America monument, Laos Memorial, to honor the Lao- and Hmong-American veterans and their American advisers who fought to assist the United States during the Vietnam War.
- Bee Vang (actor in Gran Torino)
- Blong Xiong Fresno city councilmember 2007 to 2015
- Kou Yang, professor at California State University, Stanislaus who is part of the second wave of ethnic Hmong American scholars
