= Hmong Veterans' Naturalization Act of 2000 =

United States federal law

The Hmong Veterans' Naturalization Act of 2000 (H.R. 371; Pub.L. 106-207; 114 Stat. 316.) is legislation which granted Hmong and ethnic Laotian veterans, who were legal refugee aliens in the US (political refugees, facing political persecution, ethnic cleansing, human rights violations or genocide) from the communist Lao government, and who also served in U.S.-backed guerrilla, or US special forces-backed units in Laos, during the Vietnam War, "an exemption from the English language requirement and special consideration for civics testing for certain refugees from Laos applying for naturalization." The initial Act gave these alien veterans eighteen months since the day of the bill's passage by the U.S. Congress, and its signature by the President of the United States, to file a naturalization application for honorary U.S. citizenship. However, the Act was later amended by additional legislation passed by the United States Congress which extended the N-400 filing date by an additional 18 months.

The legislation was passed in bipartisan fashion by the then Republican-controlled United States House of Representatives, and U.S. Senate, and signed into law at the White House by President Bill Clinton on May 26, 2000.

Primary House backers of the original House bill authored by Representative Bruce Vento (D-MN) included Congressmen Lamar Smith (R-TX), Immigration Subcommittee Chairman, Mel Watt, (D-NC) Immigration Subcommittee, Vice Chairman, Calvin Dooley, (D-CA) Judiciary Committee Chairman Henry Hyde (R-Il), Steve Gunderson (R-WI), Richard Pombo (R-CA), George Radanovich (R-CA), Steve Chabot (R-OH), Wally Herger (R-CA), Tim Holden (D-PA), Howard Coble (R-NC), Robert Dornan (R-CA), Duncan Hunter (senior) (R-CA) and others.

In the Senate, the bill was introduced and advanced by Minnesota Senator Paul Wellstone (D-MN) and others, including Senator Rod Grams (R-MN), as well as Wisconsin Senators Russell Feingold (D-WI), Herb Kohl (D-WI), et al.

In its formative stages in the early 1990s, the bill was researched, developed, backed and spearheaded by the nation's largest non-profit ethnic Hmong and Laotian veterans organizations, including the Central Valley, California–based Lao Veterans of America Institute and the Washington, D.C.–based Lao Veterans of America, Inc. (LVA) who testified in support of the legislation in 1997 at Committee hearings before the U.S. House of Representatives and Congress and who repeatedly mobilized in support of the bill's passage. Colonel Wangyee Vang, President of the Lao Veterans of America Institute, Philip Smith, Executive Director of the Center for Public Policy Analysis, the Lao Veterans of America, Inc. and others, helped educate and mobilized the Lao- and Hmong-American community across the United States to support passage of the legislation.

Mr. Philip Smith, the LVA, Lao Veterans of America Institute, the Center for Public Policy Analysis, and others, also urged passage of two additional pieces of legislation, one to grant an additional 18 months to implement the bill (passed in 2001), another to grant citizenship to Hmong veterans widows.

Lao Hmong General Vang Pao, the most influential leader in the Hmong community prior to his decline and death in the United States, also backed passage of the legislation.

As a result of the Hmong Veterans Naturalization Act tens of thousands of ethnic Laotian and Hmong veterans received American citizenship.

== Historical context ==
Decades before the Hmong Veterans' Naturalization Act came into existence, a U.S.-backed clandestine and covert military operation took place in Laos for some 14 years during the Vietnam War. The United States' Central Intelligence Agency (CIA) recruited and guided indigenous Hmong and ethnic Laotian peoples to fight the invading North Vietnamese Army and Marxist People's Army of Vietnam in the Royal Kingdom of Laos. Hmong involvement in the Vietnam War is known to many as the "Secret War" or the Laotian Civil War and North Vietnamese invasion of Laos. Despite the United States' and CIA's efforts in support of the Royal Lao Government and Hmong, and the anti-communist Hmong and Laotian forces supporting and participating in the United States' covert operations, the country of Laos eventually fell to the invading North Vietnamese Army (NVA) and communist Pathet Lao.

The impact of the North Vietnamese invasion of Laos and the Royal Lao Government's efforts to defend the ancient Kingdom of Laos with the help of the U.S.-backed Hmong "Secret Army" guerrilla and special forces caused significant casualties. According to Representative Bruce Vento, conservative estimates "list 18,000 to 20,000 [Laotians] killed in combat between 1963 and 1971 with tens of thousands injured." The Lao Veterans of America and Lao Veterans of America Institute put the number at over 50,000 Hmong veterans killed during the Vietnam War, not including tens of thousands of Hmong and Laotian refugees and asylum seekers killed prior to 1975. This number does not account for the number of widows, orphans, and displaced people. These figures also do not account for the tens of thousands of Hmong and Royal Laotian veterans and their families who died in reeducation camps, following the Communist takeover in 1975, or who were killed in ongoing military attacks by the Lao People's Army and Vietnam People's Army as documented by the Lao Human Rights Council, Amnesty International, the Center for Public Policy Analysis, the United League for Democracy in Laos, and others.

== Purposes ==
The Hmong Veterans' Naturalization Act of 2000 aimed to make naturalization an easier process for the Hmong-American veteran refugees (official legal aliens living, and legally residing, in the United States who were political refugees), who served in Laos in support U.S. forces during the Vietnam War, to become fully naturalized, U.S. citizens. The key members of Congress, organizations and people backing and fighting for the introduction and passage of the bill had at least three similar goals or purposes, which included:

The first goal was for the United States' government to grant citizenship to those Hmong- and Laotian-American veterans who served with U.S. forces during the Vietnam War. This also meant the recognition of the important sacrifices the U.S. "Secret Army" made in support of the defense of U.S. national security interests and the Kingdom of Laos during the Vietnam War, including deaths that occurred, the injuries, and loss of homeland for the people of Laos.

The second purpose was to educate the U.S. Congress and U.S. government about the unique obstacle the Hmong people had in taking the English test in order to get naturalized. For many Hmong, English was difficult because the Hmong language only recently acquired written characters.

The third goal of the act was to help Hmong-American veteran's families adjust and obtain citizenship in the United States.

== Journey ==
This bill was first introduced in the early 1990s by a handful of members of Congress led by Representative Bruce Vento (D-MN), and key Republicans, including Don Ritter (R-PA), in an effort to honor Hmong and Laotian veterans who were enlisted in the U.S.-backed "Secret Army" in the Kingdom of Laos during the Vietnam War. The bill was a result of not only a large lobby effort by the Lao Veterans of America (LVA), and its National President, Colonel Wangyee Vang, and Washington, D.C., Director, Philip Smith, but also support and pressure from the Hmong community, and Vang Pao as well—-who Smith and the LVA worked closely with from 1988-2003 on various public policy issues.

Philip Smith, a veteran public policy analyst and influential legislative affairs expert on Capitol Hill, along with Colonel Wangyee Vang, of the Fresno, California-based Lao Veterans of America Institute and LVA, are widely credited as having developed the bipartisan strategy, and efforts in the U.S. Congress and Lao- and Hmong-American community that ultimately led both to the introduction and final passage of the legislation, as well as the two follow-on bills to grant and extension of time to implement the original bill and grant citizenship to the Hmong veterans' widows.

Although the bill eventually enjoyed broad non-partisan support, it took ten years to pass. The 106th Congress finally passed the bill and on May 26, 2000, President Bill Clinton signed the Hmong Veterans' Naturalization Act into law.

Historic and massive events, held for the first time ever at the national level, at the Laos Memorial, in Arlington National Cemetery, the U.S. Congress, and Vietnam Memorial, to honor Laotian and Hmong veterans of the U.S. "Secret Army" were organized and funded in Washington, D.C., on May 14–15, 1997, by Wangyee Vang and Philip Smith of the Lao Veterans of America Institute, LVA and Centre for Public Policy Analysis. The national events helped to bring awareness to the plight of the Hmong and advance the legislation in the U.S. Congress.

== Content ==
The Hmong Veterans' Naturalization Act gives those veterans who qualify a complete exemption from the English language portion of the citizenship test, meaning they will not be tested on their ability to write, read, or speak English.

The Act takes into consideration the difficulty of the civic portion of the U.S. citizenship test as well. Applicants are allowed to use an interpreter for the civics portion. It can be done in any language of their choice. Interpreters are provided. They are also only asked ten of the twenty five questions and only need to correctly answer six of these ten questions in order to pass this portion.

This does not arrange for any veterans' benefits or monetary reparations

The law only applies those who:

1. "Served with a U.S.-backed Laotian based special guerrilla unit, or irregular forces, and
2. Served in the U.S "Secret Army" anytime between February 28, 1961 to September 18, 1978 and
3. Were admitted into the United States through a political refugee status process from Laos, or
4. Is a veteran who meets all of the qualifications listed above at the time the veteran applied to enter the
5. United States and was admitted as a refugee from Laos"

Applicants must be ethnic Hmong or Laotian to be considered. However, this act only allows those who fought during the Vietnam War in Laos, who are legal political refugees from Laos to apply.

Applicants must have a proof of military service in Laos during the Vietnam War in order to be eligible. This includes an affidavit for a U.S.-backed Lao Hmong commanding officer or existing legal document from the U.S. Immigration & Naturalization Service.

The Hmong Veterans' Widows Naturalization Act, passed later by the U.S. Congress, applies to widows of the above.

The maximum number of citizens admitted under the act was 45,000.

== Reactions ==
Both Democratic Party, and Republican Party members of the U.S. Congress made numerous statements in support of the legislation seeking its passage. President Bill Clinton also acknowledged the act through a statement in 2000, after he signed the bill. He recognized the law as a "tribute to the service, courage, and sacrifice of the Hmong people who were our allies in Laos during the Vietnam War" and that "after the Vietnam war, many Hmong soldiers and their families came to the United States and have become part of the social fabric of American society."

Cherzong Vang, the then President of the Minnesota branch of Lao Veterans of America expressed happiness for the bill as well. After it was passed by both houses, he "pulled up a pant leg and traced the scars a grenade seared into his leg.... He stated, 'I feel very happy. At last America has recognized its promise to us.'"

== See also ==
- Laos Memorial
- Paul Wellstone
- Lamar S. Smith
- Henry Hyde
- Vietnam War
