= Vang Sue =

- Major Vang Su
- Born: January 30, 1945; Xieng Khouang, Laos
- Died: October 18, 1972 (aged 27) KIA; Laos
- Military career
- Allegiance: Kingdom of Laos
- Branch: Royal Lao Air Force
- Service years: 1965–1972
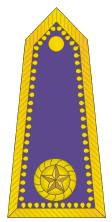
- Rank: Major
- Units: Special Unit based at LS-20A, Long Tieng, Laos
- Commands: T-28 fighter bomber squadron
- Conflicts: Secret War; Second Indochina War (Vietnam War) in Laos; Cold War
- Awards: Order of the White Elephant; Distinguished Flying Cross

Major Vang Sue (Su, Seu) (also transliterated as Vaj Xwm) (January 30, 1945 – October 18, 1972) was a Laotian Hmong fighter pilot. Recipient of the USAF Distinguished Flying Cross. He flew over 5,000 combat missions as a T-28 bomber pilot. Vang flew briefly with Hmong fighter ace Lee Lue before Lee was shot down and became General Vang Pao's preeminent pilot after Lee's death. He frequently flew 15 days consecutively, and often as much as 15 sorties in a day. Renowned for his daring and bombing accuracy, Vang was shot down by anti-aircraft guns and killed on October 18, 1972.

== Biography ==
Vang Sue was born on 30 January 1945, in Xieng Khouang, Laos to KiaPao Vang (father) and Ying Xiong (mother). He married a school teacher, May A. Yang, in 1967 and together they had four children. Vang Sue joined the Royal Lao Air Force in 1965, and attained the rank of Wing Leader.

== See also ==
- Air America (airline)
- Air America (film)
- Battle of Lima Site 85
- History of Laos since 1945
- Laos Memorial
- Laotian Civil War also known as the "Secret War"
- North Vietnamese invasion of Laos
- Franco-Thai War
