= The Center for Public Policy Analysis =

American non-profit organization

The Center for Public Policy Analysis (CPPA), or Centre for Public Policy Analysis, was established in Washington, D.C., in 1988 and describes itself as a non-profit, non-partisan, think tank and research organization. The CPPA is a non-governmental organization (NGO) focused on foreign policy, national security, human rights, refugee and international humanitarian issues. Its current executive director is Philip Smith.

The CPPA focuses on key domestic and international public policy issues, including those in the United States, Asia, Europe, the Middle East and the Americas. It has frequently raised concerns about international security, counter-terrorism, civil society, the environment, international trade and tariffs, press and internet freedom, human rights, and religious freedom issues, including the plight of political asylum seekers and refugees, in Southeast Asia and Southwest Asia.

The CPPA researches and writes about press and internet freedom, and the persecution of journalists, in the Philippines and elsewhere.

Concerned about environmental issues, the CPPA has raised awareness about illegal logging, and environmental degradation, in Vietnam, Laos, Cambodia and elsewhere.

The CPPA also focuses on economic, political, human rights, religious freedom and humanitarian issues in Indochina. The organization is described as an "outspoken supporter" and human rights proponent for ethnic, minority Laotian and Hmong people in Laos and Vietnam.

From 1998 to 2013, the CPPA in cooperation with members of the U.S. Congress has hosted the U.S. Congressional Forum on Laos, in the U.S. Congress, in Washington, D.C. The U.S. Congressional Forum on Laos brings together policy experts, diplomats, non-governmental organizations (NGOs), human rights and environmental groups, community leaders, business leaders, Members of the U.S. Congress, political and religious dissidents and others to discuss current issues of concern regarding the nation of Laos and the region.

The CPPA says it conducts public policy events and briefings in the US Congress and Washington, D.C., on a range of public affairs issues. It says it organizes research and fact-finding missions in the United States and abroad with US policymakers to gain first-hand information about key issues, developments and events.

The CPPA also researches military and national security history issues regarding World War I, World War II, the Korean War, the Vietnam War (First and Second Indochina Wars), the first and second Gulf War (U.S.-Iraq War) and the "War on Terrorism," (both before and after the terrorist attacks in New York City on September 11, 2001). The CPPA is concerned about the plight of veterans, including minority veterans, of these conflicts, and is active in policy research and debate on key issues.

The CPPA also works to honor Vietnam War veterans of the First and Second Indochina War who served in Vietnam, the Kingdom of Laos, Cambodia and the Kingdom of Thailand, including American, South Vietnamese, Royal Laotian, Cambodian and French military and clandestine veterans.

== Press and internet freedom ==
The CPPA researches and writes about press and internet freedom in the Philippines, Egypt, Afghanistan, Pakistan, Lao, Vietnam, Thailand and elsewhere.

== Persecution of journalists in the Philippines ==
The CPPA has repeatedly raised concerns about freedom of the press and the plight of journalists in the Philippines and ongoing press and internet freedom violations. The intimidation, persecution and killing of journalists in Mindanao and the restive Southern areas of the Philippines have been give special attention by the CPPA in recent years.

== Afghanistan and Pakistan ==
Prior to the terrorist attacks on the United States on September 11, 2001, 9/11 and its aftermath, the CPPA, and its Executive Director Philip Smith, worked to co-found, establish and assist the Washington, D.C.-based Afghanistan Foundation (AF) in its research and policy efforts educate policymakers and the general public about the nation of Afghanistan, its people, history and culture, and the threat of trans-national terrorism posed by radicalized elements within Afghanistan and the region. During the Soviet Union's invasion and occupation of Afghanistan, Smith formerly served as a foreign policy and national security advisor in the U.S. House of Representatives as well as staff liaison for the bipartisan U.S. Congressional Task Force on Afghanistan co-chaired by U.S. Congressman Charlie Wilson and other Members of Congress. Smith traveled to Afghanistan, Pakistan and the region on U.S. Congressional research and humanitarian missions during the Soviet occupation of Afghanistan and prior to the September terrorist attacks on the World Trade Center in New York City and the Pentagon. Smith, the CPPA and the Afghanistan Foundation assisted in support of Afghan refugees, and political dissidents, including Ahmad Shah Massoud, Ismael Khan, Hamid Karzai, and key Afghan leaders and others, during the war and its aftermath. During it early years, the CPPA and Philip Smith provided office space and support to the Afghanistan Foundation on Capitol Hill during its founding, and frequently hosted meetings of key Afghan opposition and dissident leaders with Foundation. During key years prior and after 9/11, Philip Smith also served as executive director, board member and officer of the Afghanistan Foundation. In the days and weeks following the 9/11 terrorist attacks, and the assassination of Ahmed Shah Massoud, Smith, the CPPA and Afghanistan Foundation worked jointly in Washington, D.C., and Capitol Hill to advocate for, and assist the Northern Alliance and moderate Pushtun, Tajik, and Ismali religious and tribal leaders in combating terrorism in Afghanistan, as well as Afghan Uzbek leader Rashid Dostum, and Uzbek ethnic forces in the Mazar-e-Sharif area and elsewhere.

== Environmental issues in Southeast Asia ==
The upswing in illegal logging in Southeast Asia has caused concern in many quarters about environmental destruction and human rights violations against minority jungle-dwelling peoples. The CPPA conducts extensive research regarding ongoing illegal logging in Laos, Cambodia, Vietnam and elsewhere in Asia.

The role of Vietnam People's Army (VPA), and VPA owned companies, in illegal logging in the Lao People's Democratic Republic, Laos, and Cambodia continues to be documented by the CPPA and other human rights and environmental NGOs and advocates.

== Cambodia ==
The CPPA researches issues regarding Cambodia. It has expressed concerns about widespread election irregularities and fraud in the July 28, 2013, elections in Cambodia and Prime Minister Hun Sen's decision to deploy army troops, tanks, heavy weapons, armored personnel carriers and security forces to the capital of Phnom Penh following the contested elections.

== U.S. Congressional Forum on Laos ==
From 1998-2013, the CPPA in cooperation with Members of the U.S. Congress has hosted the U.S. Congressional Forum on Laos, in the U.S. Congress, in Washington, D.C. The U.S. Congressional Forum on Laos brings together policy experts, diplomats, non-governmental organizations (NGOs), human rights and environmental groups, community leaders, business leaders, Members of the U.S. Congress, political and religious dissidents and others to discuss current issues of concern regarding the nation of Laos and the region.

== Religious freedom violations ==
The CPPA conducts research, and develops awareness about, religious freedom violations, and religious persecution, in the Marxist Lao People's Democratic Republic (LPDR), the Socialist Republic of Vietnam (SRV) and other countries, including the killing of independent and dissident Buddhists, Christians and Animist religious believers.

The CPPA has provided information about the Lao People's Army and Vietnam People's Army military attacks against minority Lao and Hmong Catholics, Protestant Christians in Vietnam and Laos including the killing of religious believers in various provinces in Laos and in Dien Bien Phu Province, and other places, in Vietnam.

In 2003, the CPPA raised awareness about the plight of St. Paul, Minnesota, Protestant, Christian Hmong-American pastor Naw Karl Moua (Mua)'s arrest in Laos by Lao military and security forces, along with independent journalists, investigating Lao and Hmong Christians suffering persecution and military attacks under the Pathet Lao government.

In 2011, the CPPA confirmed military attacks by Vietnam People's Army and Lao People's Army forces on ethnic minority Hmong Christians, at least four of whom were brutally killed by the soldiers.

The CPPA has raised concerns about the persecution of Catholic, Protestant and other believers in Vietnam, including efforts to curtail or halt the celebration of Christmas and Easter ceremonies by the secret police and security forces in Vietnam, especially from 2003-2013.

In 2014-2015, according to news reports and editorials in The Diplomat, Wall Street Journal and other sources, the CPPA and others issued reports about violent attacks by Hanoi-backed police and security forces.

== Communiques on imprisoned Laotians ==
The CPPA has issued a number of high-level joint international communiques, and appeals, with leading non-governmental organizations, especially regarding the plight of political and religious dissidents and Indochinese refugees and asylum seekers.

In 2005, the Laos National Federation, the Center for Public Policy Analysis, the Lao Veterans of America, Inc., the United League for Democracy in Laos, Inc., the Lao Association of Washington, D.C., Lao Huam Phao Association, Free Laos Campaign, Inc., the Laos Institute for Democracy, and others, issued a joint communique about human rights violations in Laos involving the Lao government and military as well as the Socialist Republic of Vietnam (SRV). The communique raised concerns about United Nations findings about racial discrimination against the ethnic Hmong minority in Laos and violations of the Viet-Lao "Treaty of Friendship and Cooperation" by the government and military leaders in Hanoi.

In 2010, the Center for Public Policy Analysis (CPPA), the United League for Democracy in Laos (ULDL) and a coalition of Lao and Hmong non-governmental organizations released a twelve-point joint communique in Bangkok, Thailand, New York, and Washington, D.C., about the egregious religious persecution of minority Christian and Animist believers in Laos, and military attacks upon them, as well as the plight of imprisoned Laotian student leaders, political prisoners and Hmong refugees in Laos. The communique also decried the Lao People's Army attacks on Laotian and Hmong hiding in the jungle and mountains of Laos.

On Christmas Day 2011, the Paris, France-based Lao Movement for Human Rights, the CPPA and a coalition of NGOs issued a joint international communique about the increased arrest, persecution, torture and killing of minority Laotian and Hmong Christians, including Catholic and Protestant believers in Laos by the government and military. The communique raised concerns about intensified and deepening religious freedom violations in Laos by the Lao government and military.

== Humanitarian appeals ==
In 2011, the CPPA issued a joint international statement and appeal, with key NGOs, urging Laos to release political and religious dissidents, and jailed American citizens, prior to a key meeting of the communist party congress in Vientiane.

In early 2013, the CPPA, and its executive director, Philip Smith, issued numerous international appeals and statements urging the Pathet Lao government in Vientiane to release information and free international humanitarian advocate and Magsaysay Award-winning civic activist Sombath Somphone who was arrest by Lao policy and security officials in Vientiane in December 2012 and disappeared into the Lao prison system.

In February 2013, Smith and the CPPA wrote and editorial published by The Nation newspaper in Bangkok, Thailand (Thailand's second largest English Language Daily), urging the Lao government to abide by resolutions passed by the European Parliament calling for the release of Sombath Somphone and Hmong and Laotian political prisoners, dissidents and refugees.

In March 2013, the CPPA and Philip Smith accused the Lao government and communist officials of obstructing the investigation into the arrest, abduction and disappearance of Sombath Somphone at the hands of Lao security forces.

In the context of Sombath Somphone's disappearance, and other current matters in Laos, Smith and the CPPA also provided research and information about extrajudicial killings in Laos by the Lao military and security forces of political and religious dissident and opposition group leaders as well as ongoing human rights violations in Laos and serious religious freedom violations as reported by the US Commission on International Religious Freedom and others. Smith also provided information about the Lao government's ongoing persecution of the Hmong people, including the 2013 killing of Hmong school teachers by soldiers of the Lao People's Army in cooperation with the Vietnam People's Army advisers.

== Thailand and repatriation of refugees ==
The CPPA has a long history of work with Indochinese refugees and asylum seekers in Southeast Asia. It played a leading role regarding Lao Hmong refugees and asylum seekers who sought refugee in camps along the Mekong River and Thai-Lao border, Wat Tham Krabok and the camps and detention center at Ban Huay Nam Khao, White Water, Petchabun Province, Thailand.

From 1989-2013, Philip Smith and the CPPA were involved in major efforts to halt, stop, and reverse the forced repatriation of tens of thousands of Laotian and Hmong political refugees and asylum seekers in Southeast Asia, and were successful in having tens of thousands granted political asylum in the United States and in other third countries, including Canada, France, Australia, New Zealand and elsewhere. The CPPA also played a major international role in raising human rights concerns about the thousands of Lao Hmong refugees that were forcibly repatriated from these camp in Thailand back to the communist regime in Laos that they fled.

== Persecution of Viet Hmong protestors ==
The CPPA said that Vietnamese troops had killed 28 Hmong Catholic and Protestant Christian protesters, during one period, in Dien Bien Phu area of Vietnam, with hundreds more missing, following multi-day anti-government protests in Vietnam near the Laos border in 2011.

The CPPA and others claim more Vietnamese Hmong were killed, wounded, or "disappeared" by Vietnamese and Laotian security forces during the long anti-government protest which involved issues of religious freedom, religious freedom violations, land reform, illegal logging, and concerns about government corruption.

According to the CPPA and others, many of the peaceful protestors involved in the protests who were arrested, disappeared or killed were Hmong Catholics and Christians.

The Vietnamese government acknowledged there had been clashes but denied anyone had been killed.

Independent journalists and human rights organizations raised serious concerns. The SRV sealed off the area to journalists during the military crackdown against the Vietnamese Hmong protesters in Dien Bien Province area which involved the deployment of VPA troops and helicopter gunships.

The SRV sentenced a number of the Vietnamese Hmong protestors to prison sentences, which was criticized by human rights organizations and experts.

== Historical research and veterans memorial ceremonies ==
The CPPA frequently uses Twitter to communicate news about current, classical and ancient history, and new archaeological findings, including the history of Ancient Rome, the Roman Republic, and Roman Empire.

The CPPA also works to honor Vietnam War veterans of the First and Second Indochina Wars who served in Vietnam, the Kingdom of Laos, Cambodia and the Kingdom of Thailand, including American, South Vietnamese, Royal Laotian, Cambodian and French military and clandestine veterans.

The CPPA works with major veterans organizations, including the Lao Veterans of America, Inc. the Lao Veterans of America Institute, the U.S. Special Forces Association, Green Berets, and others, to seek to honor Lao and Hmong veterans who served in the "U.S. Secret Army" in Laos during the Vietnam War. In May 1997, the CPPA worked with these organization to help dedicate the Laos and Hmong Memorial in Arlington National Cemetery Laos Memorial.

In 1995, the Center for Public Policy Analysis played a key role in commemorating the 20th Anniversary of the end of the Vietnam War at ceremonies held with the Southeast Asian-American and Lao- and Hmong-American community in the Central Valley and Fresno, California. The events were recognized and memorialized by the U.S. Congress

On May 14–15, 1997, Lao Hmong-American community leader Wangyee Vang, the CPPA and its Director Philip Smith, established the Laos Memorial in Arlington National Cemetery with Grant McClure of the Counterparts veterans organizations. It is the first and only monument in Washington, D.C., and Arlington to the Lao and Hmong veterans and their American advisors who served in Laos during the Vietnam War.

The CPPA's Philip Smith has commented publicly, on a number of occasions, about U.S. intelligence community and Central Intelligence Agency figures, and operations, including Vietnam and Cold War era figures and activities, undertaken by both Democratic and Republican Administrations, including such officials as William Colby, Tony Poe, Lawrence Devlin and others.

In 2011, the CPPA campaigned for former Hmong leader and Royal Lao Army Lieutenant General Vang Pao to be given a memorial service in Arlington National Cemetery after US authorities refused to grant him the right to be buried there. Pao was arrested in the US in 2007 on charges of plotting to overthrow the one-party, communist Laos' Government, the Lao People's Democratic Republic (LPDR); The charges against General Vang Pao were later dropped. The CPPA's Executive Director, Philip Smith, wrote an editorial in the Minneapolis Star Tribune outlining Vang Pao's contribution to U.S. national security interests during the Vietnam War following the Lao-Hmong leaders death in 2011.

The CPPA's Philip Smith persisted in his efforts, and the CPPA, along with the Lao Veterans of America, Inc., the Lao Veterans of America Institute, and others, helped to organize national veterans ceremonies in May 2011 to officially honor Vang Pao at Arlington National Cemetery

== Honorary U.S. citizenship and burial honors ==
The CPPA worked with Members of the U.S. Congress beginning in the early 1990s, and with Colonel Wangyee Vang and Cherzong Vang of the Lao Veterans of America, and other community leaders, to research and propose efforts to grant honorary U.S. citizenship to Lao- and Hmong-American veterans of the U.S. Secret Army in Laos. As a result, bipartisan legislation was introduced by U.S. Congressman Bruce Vento (D-MN) and Senator Paul Wellstone (D-MN) of Minnesota, "The Hmong Veterans' Naturalization Act of 2000". After a ten-year effort by the Center for Public Policy Analysis, the Lao Veterans of America, the Lao Veterans of America Institute and others, the legislation was passed by the Republican-controlled Congress, at the time, and signed into law by U.S. President Bill Clinton in 2000.

On March 13, 2021, Colonel Wangyee Vang was laid to rest. Philip Smith attended as executive director of CPPA and honored him at a memorial service.

The CPPA continues to engage and educate U.S. policymakers and Members of Congress about the plight of many of the Lao and Hmong-American veterans. Significant numbers of the veterans, estimated to be about 10,800 in the United States, are seeking the passage of burial honors and benefits legislation so they can be buried in U.S. national veterans cemeteries administered by the U.S. Department of Veterans Affairs. U.S. Congressmen Jim Costa (D-CA) and Paul Cook (R-CA) of California, and U.S. Senators Lisa Murkowski (R-AK) and Mark Begich (D-AK), introduced legislation seeking to grant burial honors to the Lao- and Hmong-American veterans.

In 2014, Laotian- and Hmong-American community leaders and Vietnam war veterans, and their refugee families, from California, Alaska, Minnesota, Wisconsin, Rhode Island, North Carolina, Arkansas and other states, participated in national memorial ceremonies at Arlington National Cemetery. They also engaged in high-level meetings in the U.S. Congress and Washington, D.C., with the CPPA regarding pending Lao Hmong veterans burial honors legislation. Consequently, the Hmong and Lao Veterans of the Vietnam War, and their families, continue to be recognized and honored by the U.S. Congress, White House, Obama Administration, and Arlington National Cemetery. Moreover, despite delays and some setbacks, the Lao Hmong veterans burial honors legislation continues to gather support and co-sponsors, including official co-sponsorship by U.S. Senators Bernard Sanders (I-VT), Barbara Boxer (D-CA), Dianne Feinstein (D-CA), Amy Klobuchar (D-MN), Al Franken (D-MN), Sheldon Whitehouse (D-RI), Carl Levin (D-MI), Tammy Baldwin (D-WI) and others.

In May 2015, national ceremonies were organized in Washington, D.C., and Arlington National Cemetery, by the CPPA, U.S. Special Forces Association, Lao Veterans of America, Inc., Members of the U.S. Congress, and U.S. Department of Defense, to mark the 40th anniversary of the fall of the Kingdom of Laos to invading North Vietnam Army forces and communist Pathet Lao guerrillas.

On July 12, 2019, Lao Hmong veterans from across the U.S. gathered for the fourth annual National Lao Hmong Veterans Conference. The CPPA was one of the conference's co-sponsors.
