= Lee Lue =

Laotian Air Force officer (1935-1969)

Lee Lue 𖬃𖬰𖬞 𖬘𖬞
- Lis Lwm / 𖬃𖬰𖬞 𖬘𖬞
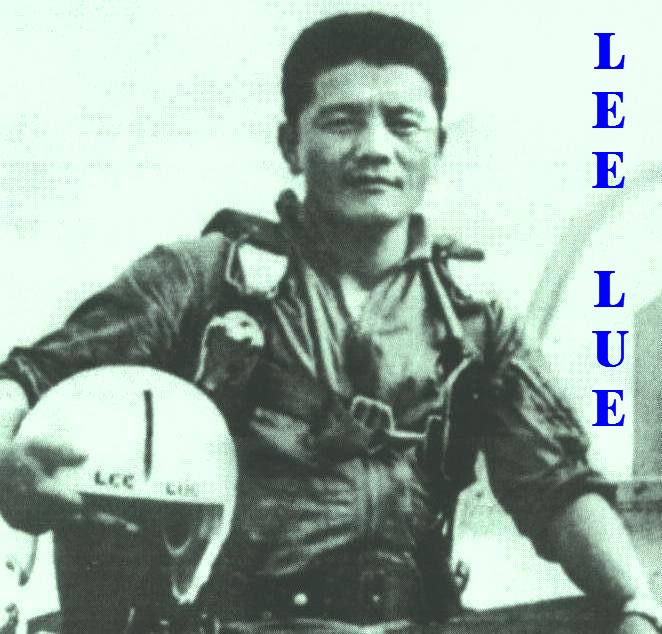
- Born: December 1935; Phou Pheng Village Xiangkhoang Province, Laos, French Indochina
- Died: 12 July 1969 (aged 33) near Muang Soui, Laos
- Relatives: wife Jou first-born son Ze
- Military career
- Allegiance: French Indochina; Kingdom of Laos
- Branch: Royal Lao Air Force
- Service years: 1967–1969
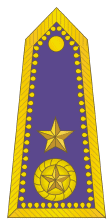
- Rank: Lieutenant colonel
- Units: Special Unit based at LS-20A, Long Tieng, Laos
- Commands: T-28 fighter bomber squadron
- Conflicts: Secret War in Laos; Second Indochina War (Vietnam War); Cold War

Major Lee Lue (RPA: Lis Lwm, Pahawh: 𖬃𖬰𖬞 𖬘𖬞; 1935 – 12 July 1969) was a Laotian Hmong fighter bomber pilot notable for flying more combat missions than any other pilot in the Kingdom of Laos. He flew as many as 10 missions a day and averaged 120 combat missions a month, totalling more than 5,000 sorties. Lee Lue was the leader of the special group of Hmong pilots flying T-28Ds from Long Tieng against the Pathet Lao and North Vietnamese positions. The group was funded by the CIA and was part of the regular Royal Lao Air Force, but took orders directly from MR2 Commander Gen. Vang Pao. His T-28 was shot down by anti-aircraft fire over Muang Soui, crashing in a mountainous area near Ban Phou Pheung Noi on July 12, 1969. At the time of his death, he had flown more combat missions than any other pilot in history.

A motto attributed to him was "Fly 'til you die." He was posthumously promoted to lieutenant colonel.

== Biography ==
Lee Lue was born in 1935 to Chong Ger Lee and his wife Pa Vang in the village of Phou Pheng in Xiangkhoang Province, Laos. In 1953, Lee Lue's family moved to Xieng Khouang city after the Vietnamese invaded Laos. After the war ended in 1955, Lee Lue married Jou and two years later their first child, a son named Nkiag (nickname: Ze), was born and went to Samthong College in 1974. Lee Lue studied in Xieng Khouang city and later enrolled in teacher training school. In 1959, he became an elementary school teacher in Lat Houng. He was among a handful of Hmong teachers in the entire country.

As the Laotian Civil War or Secret War was escalating in 1967, Touby Lyfoung and General Vang Pao requested volunteers for flight training in T-28s. The training took place in Thailand. With six months of flight training, Lee Lue and another volunteer, Vang Toua, became the first two Hmong T-28 fighter pilots. Lee Lue successfully flew aerial support for ground troops and amassed a record number of sorties.

Away from the war, Lee Lue devoted his time to studying maps, and playing cards with his comrades. Prior to his death, Lee Lue had purchased his military uniform and was waiting to be promoted to major. "He was excited about the promotion," said his wife Jou.

When the area of Muang Soui came under heavy enemy attack, Gen. Vang Pao telephoned Lee Lue, who was flying from Vientiane, to see if he carried any bombs with him as he was on his way to Long Tieng. Lee Lue's T-28 was armed. Vang Pao needed Lee Lue to attack the Pathet Lao troops in Muang Soui, as they were losing ground as well as troops. On that day, Lee Lue's T-28 was hit. His plane was later found in debris near Ban Phou Pheung Noi. "His death is among a few soldiers I cried to," stated Vang Pao in 2006. According to Christopher Robbin's book, The Ravens, respect for Lee Lue and his skills was shared by not just the Hmong but also seasoned American pilots.

== See also ==
- Air America (airline)
- Battle of Lima Site 85
- Groupement de Commandos Mixtes Aéroportés GCMA Laos
- Laos Memorial
- Lao Veterans of America
- North Vietnamese invasion of Laos
- Vang Sue
