= Richard Etchberger =

US Air Force NCO Medal of Honor recipient (1933–1968)

Richard L. Etchberger
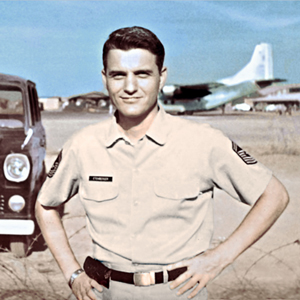
- Etchberger in Southeast Asia
- Born: March 5, 1933; Hamburg, Pennsylvania, US
- Died: March 11, 1968 (aged 35); Lima Site 85, Phou Pha Thi, Houaphanh Province, Laos
- Burial place: Saint Johns Cemetery, Hamburg, Pennsylvania
- Military career
- Allegiance: United States
- Branch: United States Air Force
- Service years: 1951–1968
- Rank: Chief Master Sergeant
- Nickname: "Dick"
- Unit: Detachment 1, 1043rd Radar Evaluation Squadron (Lima Site 85)
- Conflicts: Vietnam War; Battle of Lima Site 85 †
- Awards: Medal of Honor; Purple Heart

Richard Loy Etchberger (March 5, 1933 – March 11, 1968) was a senior non-commissioned officer in the United States Air Force who posthumously received the United States military's highest decoration, the Medal of Honor, for his actions during the Battle of Lima Site 85 in the Vietnam War. The medal was formally presented to his three sons by President Barack Obama during a ceremony at the White House on September 21, 2010.

== Military career ==
A native of Hamburg, Pennsylvania, Etchberger graduated from Hamburg High School in 1951. He joined the Air Force on August 31 of that year, and was promoted to Chief Master Sergeant on April 1, 1967.

=== Battle of Lima Site 85 ===
During the North Vietnamese invasion of Laos and the Vietnam War, Etchberger was among a group of Airmen hand-picked for a classified mission: manning secret radar facilities in the Kingdom of Laos. According to the 1962 International Agreement on the Neutrality of Laos, the U.S. was to have no military facilities in that country. As such, the selectees would officially become civilians employed by Lockheed Aircraft. Etchberger was deployed to Lima Site 85, used to direct bombing missions against targets in Laos and North Vietnam. The code name for this top secret mission was "Heavy Green." The site was staffed by sixteen 'former' airmen, including Etchberger, two CIA agents, and one forward air controller. A large force of local guerrilla Laotian and Hmong fighters of the "U.S. Secret Army" also defended, and heavily engaged, the base prior to, and during, the battle.

Between November 1967 and March 1968, Lima Site 85 directed 27 percent of all air strike missions in the Kingdom of Laos and North Vietnam. When successful strikes were launched even through heavy cloud cover, the North Vietnamese realized that a radar facility must be nearby. Beginning in January 1968, North Vietnamese troops began closing in on Site 85. On January 13, the base was strafed by two An-2 Colt biplanes, killing several of the local guerrillas. The crew of a CIA Air America UH-1H helicopter responded to the attack, managing to shoot down one aircraft with an AK-47. Plans were made to abandon and destroy the base, but they were not implemented in time.

In the early morning hours of March 11, 1968, the site came under attack from North Vietnamese soldiers who had scaled the surrounding cliffs. By 3 a.m., Etchberger and seven others were the only surviving Americans out of the original 19. Etchberger tended to the wounded and fought off the advancing North Vietnamese troops until a rescue helicopter arrived. He then helped load the wounded onto slings to be lifted into the hovering aircraft before coming aboard himself. As the helicopter headed towards an air base in Thailand, an enemy soldier below fired his AK-47 into the underside of the aircraft, fatally wounding Etchberger.

Staff Sgt. John Daniel had been shot twice in the legs and was taking shelter amidst the bodies of other casualties when Etchberger recovered him and fitted him into the helicopter sling. Upon regaining consciousness and learning that Etchberger himself had been killed, Daniel voiced his disbelief: "Hell, he hasn't been injured, he hasn't been shot. How is he dead?" Decades later, when Etchberger was awarded the Medal of Honor, Daniel, in an interview with Stars and Stripes, suggested: "It should have happened 42 years-plus ago, and he should have gotten a damn 55-gallon drum full of them if he wanted them."

== Legacy ==
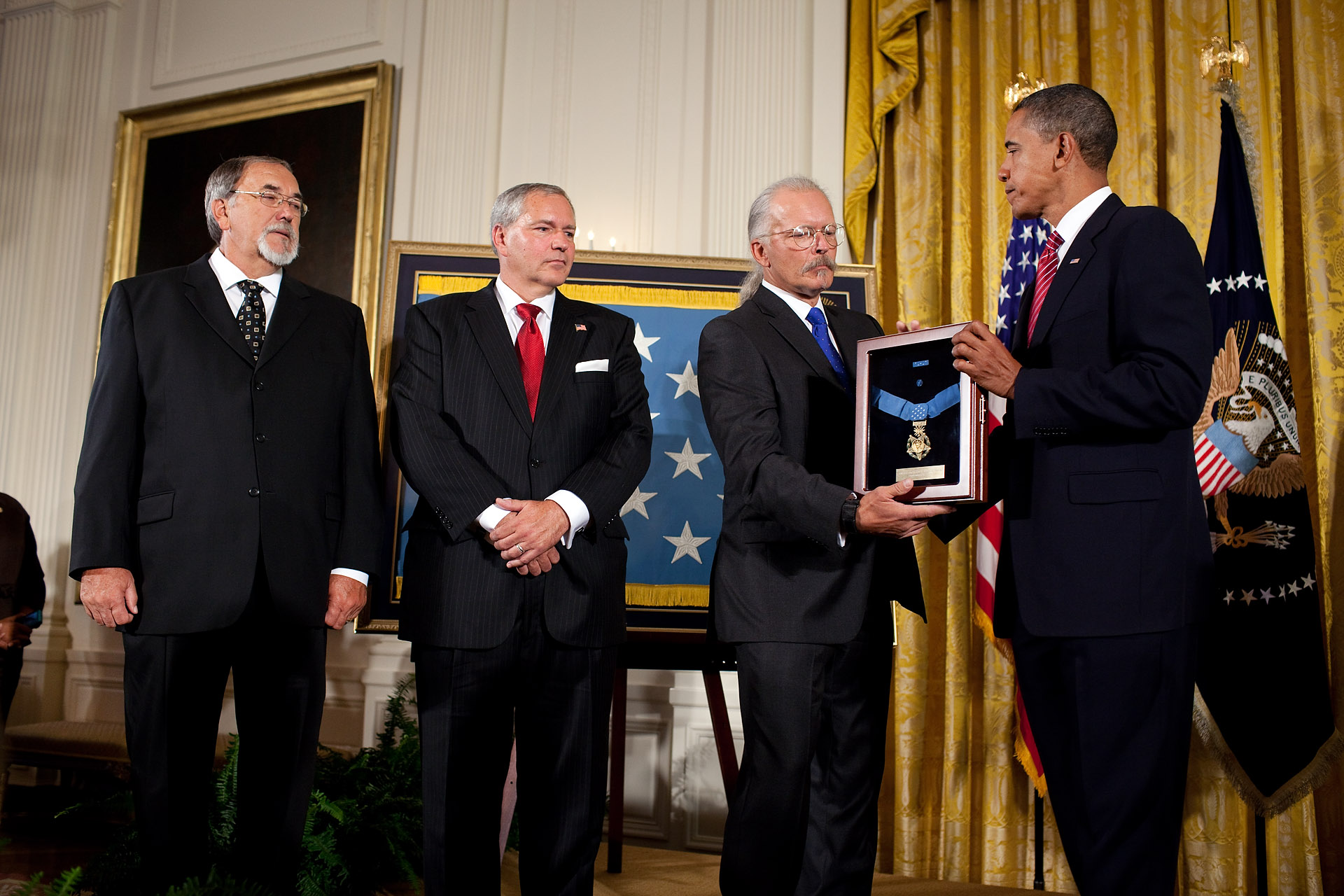
President Barack Obama presents the Medal of Honor to Etchberger's sons on September 21, 2010

Etchberger was recommended for the Medal of Honor shortly after his death, but the nomination was rejected. Numerous accounts blame President Lyndon B. Johnson, but the decision was made by Gen. John D. Ryan, the Air Force vice chief of staff, who was the USAF approving authority for top awards. The Lima Site mission was still classified at the time, and the U.S. was not supposed to have soldiers in Laos. Etchberger was instead awarded the second highest decoration, the Air Force Cross. The decoration was presented to his family during a secret ceremony at the Pentagon.

It was only after the Lima Site mission had been declassified fourteen years after Etchberger's death that his sons learned their father's true fate; they had previously been told that he died in a helicopter accident. In the early 2000s, veterans of the Air Force's 1st Combat Evaluation Group began requesting that Etchberger's Air Force Cross be upgraded to the Medal of Honor. The upgrade was approved by Secretary of the Air Force Michael B. Donley in 2008, and by the U.S. Congress in 2009, spearheaded by the leadership of U.S. Congressman Tim Holden (D-PA) and the Lao Veterans of America in Washington, D.C.

Etchberger is buried in Saint John's Cemetery, Hamburg, Pennsylvania.

A portion of Interstate 78 in Berks County, Pennsylvania was named the CMSgt. Richard L. Etchberger Memorial Highway in his honor.

== Awards and decorations ==
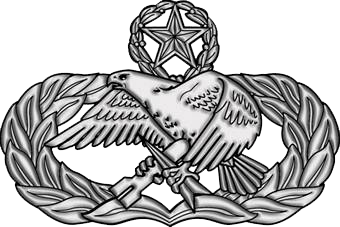

United States Air Force Master Maintenance & Munitions Badge
Medal of Honor
Purple Heart	Air Force Commendation Medal with bronze oak leaf cluster	Air Force Outstanding Unit Award with "V" device and bronze oak leaf cluster
Air Force Good Conduct Medal with bronze oak leaf cluster	Army Good Conduct Medal with three good conduct loops	National Defense Service Medal with service star
Vietnam Service Medal with three bronze campaign stars	Air Force Longevity Service Award with three bronze oak leaf clusters	Air Force Non-Commissioned Officer Professional Development Ribbon
Small Arms Expert Marksmanship Ribbon	Vietnam Gallantry Cross Unit Citation	Vietnam Campaign Medal

=== Medal of Honor citation ===
The Medal of Honor was presented to Etchberger's sons by President Obama at a White House ceremony on September 21, 2010.

The text of Etchberger's Medal of Honor citation reads:

The President of the United States of America, authorized by act of Congress, March 3, 1863, has awarded, in the name of the Congress, the Medal of Honor to Chief Master Sgt. Richard L. Etchberger, United States Air Force, for conspicuous gallantry and intrepidity at the risk of life, above and beyond the call of duty.

Chief Master Sgt. Richard L. Etchberger distinguished himself by extraordinary heroism on March 11, 1968, in the country of Laos. While assigned as Ground Radar Superintendent, Detachment 1, 1043rd Radar Evaluation Squadron. On that day, Chief Etchberger and his team of technicians were manning a top-secret defensive position at Lima Site 85 when the base was overrun by an enemy ground force. Receiving sustained and withering heavy artillery attacks directly upon his unit's position, Chief Etchberger's entire crew lay dead or severely wounded. Despite having received little or no combat training, Chief Etchberger single-handedly held off the enemy with an M-16, while simultaneously directing air strikes into the area and calling for air rescue. Because of his fierce defense and heroic and selfless actions, he was able to deny the enemy access to his position and save the lives of his remaining crew. With the arrival of the rescue aircraft, Chief Etchberger without hesitation repeatedly and deliberately risked his own life, exposing himself to heavy enemy fire, in order to place three surviving wounded comrades into rescue slings hanging from the hovering helicopter waiting to airlift them to safety. With his remaining crew safely aboard, Chief Etchberger finally climbed into the evacuation sling himself, only to be fatally wounded by enemy ground fire as he was being raised into the aircraft.

Chief Etchberger's bravery and determination in the face of persistent enemy fire and overwhelming odds are in keeping with the highest standards of performance and traditions of military service. Chief Etchberger's gallantry, self-sacrifice, and profound concern for his fellow men, at risk of his life, above and beyond the call of duty, reflect the highest credit on himself and the United States Air Force.

== See also ==
- Medal of Honor, Etchberger is featured in Season 1, Episode 7
- List of Medal of Honor recipients for the Vietnam War
- Lao Veterans of America
- Laos Memorial
- Kingdom of Laos
