= Lao Veterans of America Institute =

- Formation: 2009
- Founder: Col. Wangyee Vang
- Founded at: Fresno, California
- Type: nonprofit organization

The Lao Veterans of America Institute (LVAI) is a national non-profit organization based in Fresno, and the Central Valley, of California, with chapters throughout California. It is one of the largest Laotian and Hmong American veterans’ organizations representing tens of thousands of Lao Hmong veterans who served in the Vietnam War in the Royal Kingdom of Laos as well as their refugee families who were resettled in the United States after the conflict.

The Lao Veterans of America Institute was founded in California in the early 1990s by Col. Wangyee Vang, PhD., a Hmong-American community leader, Vietnam War veteran, and former Colonel in the U.S. "Secret Army" and Royal Lao Army in the Kingdom of Laos.

== Services to community & veterans ==
The Lao Veterans of America Institute plays a significant role in the Hmong-American community in providing education, training and services to Hmong refugees from Laos fleeing political persecution, citizenship and naturalization services to veterans and their families, and veterans' recognition and memorial services including at the Laos Memorial in Washington, D.C. and Arlington National Cemetery.

It has hosted national events, as well as local events in California, to honor Lao and Hmong veterans and commemorate key events, including anniversary memorial ceremonies marking the end of the Vietnam War in Laos.

== Humanitarian & refugee work ==
Dr. Wangyee Vang has raised concerns, and made appeals to officials in Washington, and the U.S. Congress, about the humanitarian plight of ethnic minority Laotian and Hmong political refugees, and asylum seekers, in Thailand and Laos fleeing human rights violations, religious freedom violations and political persecution.

Vang, and the Lao Veterans of America Institute, have also raised humanitarian concerns about the forced repatriation of Lao Hmong refugees from Thailand back to the communist government in Laos that they fled persecution, genocide and ethnic cleansing following the Vietnam War. On a number of occasions, they have sent high-level letters of appeal to the Royal Thai Government, White House, U.S. Congress and U.S. Department of State in opposition to the persecution and forced repatriation of Hmong refugees in Southeast Asia

Wangyee Vang has been invited to provide testimony and speak in the U.S. Congress at various policy events, including the U.S. Congressional Forum on Laos, regarding human rights and refugee issues in Southeast Asia On May 14–15, 2015, Colonel Wangyee Vang and the Lao Veterans of America Institute were honored at special veterans' memorial ceremonies held in the U.S. Congress, Arlington National Cemetery and the Vietnam War Memorial in Washington, D.C., marking the 40th Anniversary of the fall of the Royal Kingdom of Laos and Long Tieng to invading forces of the People's Army of Vietnam and North Vietnamese Army as well as communist Pathet Lao guerrillas in 1975.

== Work to grant Lao and Hmong veterans honorary American citizenship ==
The Lao Veterans of America Institute played a key role in the U.S. Congress's adoption and passage, implementation of the Hmong Veterans' Naturalization Act of 2000, which was signed into law by U.S. President Bill Clinton. Tens of the thousands of Lao and Hmong-America veterans, and their widows, were granted honorary citizenship as a result of the legislation's passage.

In addition to working with the community, the Lao Veterans of America Institute has sometimes worked with other non-profit organizations including the Lao Veterans of America, Lao Human Rights Council, the Center for Public Policy Analysis, Amnesty International and others, to assist Laotian and Hmong refugees and asylum seekers, naturalize them as new American citizens, and honor the military service of Laotian and Hmong-American veterans during the North Vietnamese invasion of Laos and Vietnam War.

== Advocacy efforts for the Hmong Veterans' Service Recognition Act ==
The Lao Veterans of America Institute seeks to honor Laotian and Hmong-American veterans who served in with US Special Forces and CIA clandestine officers in Laos during the Vietnam War. They have worked with Members of the US Congress to educate them about the conflict and to seek to have their fallen comrades honored and buried at U.S. national veterans cemeteries administered by the US Department of Veterans Affairs.

U.S. Congressman Jim Costa (D-CA) and U.S. Senator Lisa Murkowski introduced the "Hmong Veterans' Service Recognition Act" in Congress to seek to grant burial honors benefits to the Lao Hmong veterans. The Lao Veterans of America Institute supports this effort and has repeatedly sent its officers and members to Washington, D.C. to educate policymakers about the history and plight of Lao Hmong veterans and their families.

According to news reports, in February 2014, Wangyee Vang, President of the Lao Veterans of America Institute stated: ""We are strongly urging the U.S. Congress, as soon as possible, to pass and help implement crucial legislation to help those Lao- and Hmong veterans still surviving from the Vietnam War, along with their families in the United States."

In 2014–15, the Lao Veterans of America Institute continues to seek to educate Members of Congress and U.S. policymakers about the bill and its importance to Hmong-Americans and Lao Hmong veterans and their refugee families.

== See also ==
- Lao Veterans of America, Inc.
- Indochina refugee crisis
- Amnesty International
- Lima Site 85
- North Vietnamese invasion of Laos
- Laos Memorial
- Hmong Veterans' Naturalization Act of 2000
- Cherzong Vang
