= Operation Arc Light =

U.S. military operation to provide air support in Southeast Asia from 1965 to 1973

- Part of Second Indochina War (Vietnam • Laos • Cambodia), Combat Skyspot
- Type: Close air support operations
- Location: Andersen Air Force Base, Guam, United States (territory); U-Tapao Royal Thai Navy Airfield, Thailand
- Commanded by: United States Air Force; National Security Agency; Lyndon B. Johnson; Richard Nixon
- Target: Vietnam, Laos, Cambodia
- Date: 1965–1973
- Executed by: U.S. Air Force, Strategic Air Command, Combat Skyspot; National Security Agency
- Casualties: 16 B-52 Stratofortresses lost

During Operation Arc Light (sometimes Arclight) from 1965 to 1973, the United States Air Force deployed B-52 Stratofortresses from bases in the U.S. territory of Guam to provide battlefield air interdiction during the Vietnam War. This included strikes at enemy bases, supply routes, and behind the lines troop concentrations, as well as occasionally providing close air support directly to ground combat operations in Vietnam.

The conventional bombing campaign was supported by ground-control-radar detachments of the 1st Combat Evaluation Group (1CEVG) in Operation Combat Skyspot.

== Aircraft used ==
Previously dedicated to carrying nuclear weapons, the U.S. Air Force began to train strategic bomber crews in 1964 to deliver conventional munitions flying the B-52F. The bombers were deployed to Andersen Air Force Base on Guam and U-Tapao Royal Thai Navy Airfield in Thailand.

To add conventional bomb capacity, Project Big Belly modified all B-52Ds to enable them to carry 30 tons of conventional bombs. By mid-April 1966, the B-52Fs were redeployed back to the U.S. and were replaced by Big Belly-modified B-52Ds. Later in the Vietnam War, the B-52G was also deployed with the B-52D.

B-52Ds were used from the 376th Strategic Wing of Kadena Air Base in Okinawa. The 96th Strategic Air Wing from Dyess AFB, Texas, deployed for Arc Light in June 1970 for 180 days. Upon completion of the Arc Light deployment, the 376th SW B-52Ds either returned to the continental U.S. or were sent to U-Tapao. The 376th SW then ceased bomber operations but continued flying Young Tiger tanker missions.

== Operational use ==
The bombers were first used in Southeast Asia on 18 June 1965. Flying from Andersen AFB, 27 aircraft dropped 750-pound (340 kg) and 1,000-pound (455 kg) bombs on a Viet Cong stronghold. During this mission two B-52Fs were lost in a mid-air collision on 19 June while circling over the South Pacific Ocean, approximately 250 miles (400 km) offshore at the point of the Demilitarized Zone, unable to conduct mid-air refueling in awaiting arrival of KC-135A tankers for pre-strike air refueling.

Missions were commonly flown in three-plane formations known as "cells". Releasing their bombs from the stratosphere, the B-52s could neither be seen nor heard from the ground. B-52s were instrumental in destroying enemy concentrations besieging Khe Sanh in 1968, and in 1972 at An Lộc and Kontum.

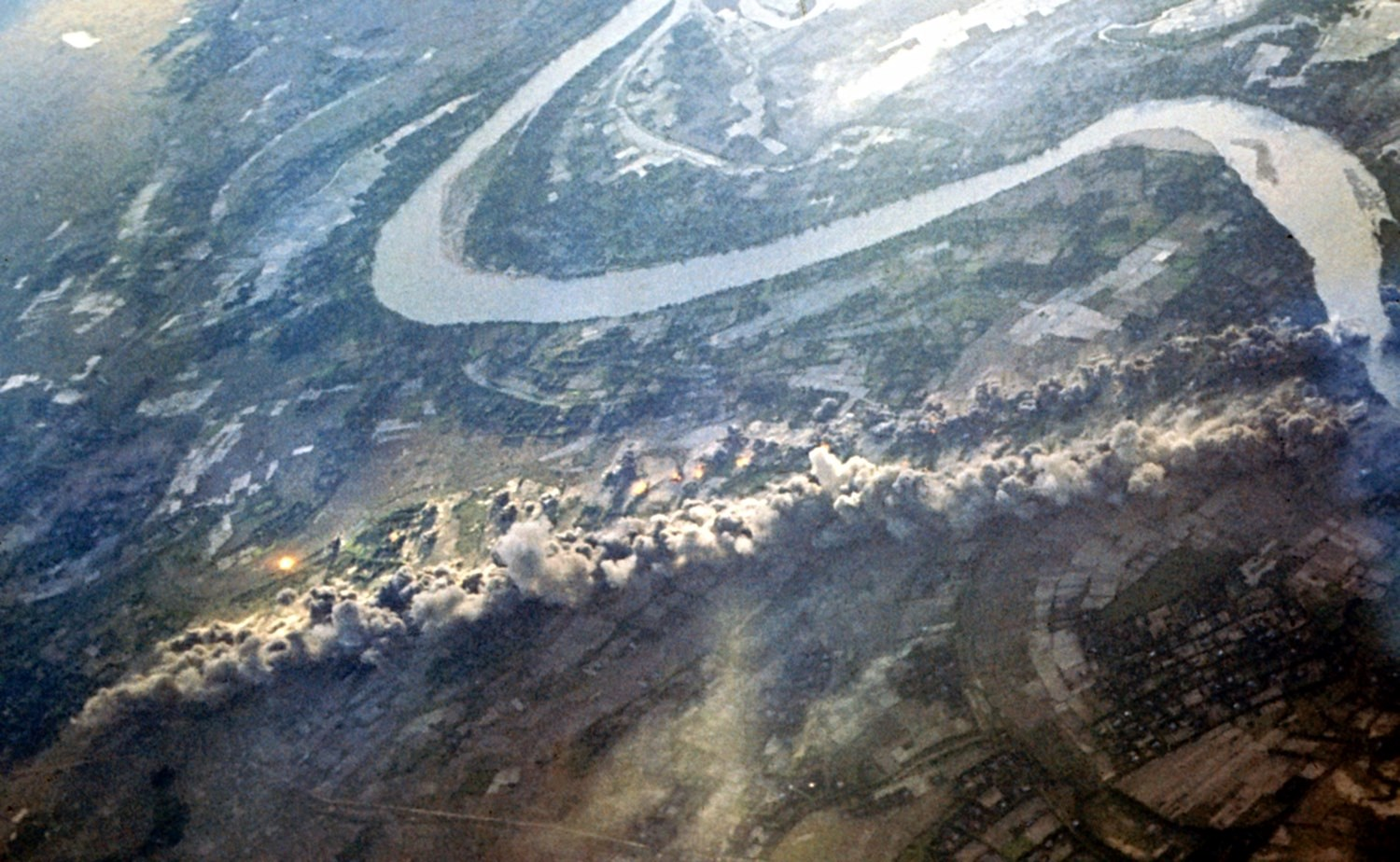
Bombs from B-52 Arc Light strike exploding

Arc Light was re-activated at Andersen on 8 February 1972 when President Richard Nixon resumed bombing of North Vietnam in an effort to move peace talks along. Operation Bullet Shot saw over 15,000 men sent to Andersen on temporary duty over the next 90 days. With limited barracks and other facilities, tents were set up for use by men working 80-hour weeks. Bullet Shot included B-52D and B-52G aircraft.

Arc Light missions continued until the cessation of hostilities by U.S. forces on 15 August 1973. Between June 1965 and August 1973, 126,615 sorties (B-52D/F/G) were flown over Southeast Asia. During those operations, the U.S. Air Force lost 31 B-52s; 18 were lost from hostile fire over North Vietnam and 13 from operational causes.

The typical full bomb loads were:

- B-52D: 108 500-pound (225 kg) bombs, or a mixed load of 84 500-lb bombs in the bomb bay and 24 750-pound (340 kg) bombs on underwing pylons.
- B-52F: 36 500-pound (225 kg) and 750-pound (340 kg) bombs in a mixed load, or 51 500-lb bombs, 27 in the bomb bay and 24 on underwing pylons.
- B-52G: 27 bombs, all in the bomb bay; no external bombs were carried.

== Problems ==
Communication leaks undermined the effectiveness of the campaign. According to Stephen Budiansky, "Despite NSA's occasional success in tightening up particularly leaky communication practices, the problems continued throughout the war. On Andersen the Vietcong were given as much as eight hours' warning and often revealing exact launch times and likely targets, because of a Soviet trawler stationed off the island listening to conversations and seeing actual B-52 launches."

== Operations in Laos and Cambodia ==
Congressional investigations of secret CIA activities in Laos revealed that B-52s were used to systematically bomb targets within Laos and Cambodia.

== Combat Skyspot Memorial ==
Nineteen technicians of the 1st Combat Evaluation Group (1CEVG) were lost in ground combat. On 21 September 2010, President Barack Obama presented the Medal of Honor to the sons of Chief Master Sergeant Richard L. Etchberger for his actions in the battle of Lima Site 85. A memorial to all 1CEVG technicians is located behind the Arc Light memorial.
