= Albert Santoli =

American writer and Founder

Albert "Al" Santoli is an American writer and Founder as well as President of the Asia America Initiative. He served in combat as a rifleman for the 25th Infantry Division during the Vietnam War. He is currently an adjunct professor of the Institute of World Politics and teaches a course entitled "Counterterrorism through Cultural Engagement and Development."

== National security, human rights and refugee issues ==
Santoli is an expert on national security, international relations, human rights, religious liberty, and refugee issues, especially regarding East, Central and Southeast Asia. He served as an adviser to members of the U.S. Congress, policymakers in Washington, D.C. and non-governmental organizations (NGO)s.

== Philippines humanitarian and anti-poverty assistance ==
Santoli has been an advocate for humanitarian assistance to the people of the Philippines and has written about their plight, including the effect of poverty, corruption, insurgencies, counterterrorism, and catastrophic typhoon damage. In 2013, Santoli was officially recognized with one of the Philippines' most prestigious awards, the "Order of the Golden Heart," for his humanitarian relief efforts.

== Veterans issues ==
During May 2014, Santoli was invited to provide keynote remarks at the Laos Memorial in Arlington National Cemetery to honor his fellow veterans of the Vietnam War as well as Lao and Hmong veterans of the "U.S. Secret Army" who defended the Kingdom of Laos during the North Vietnamese invasion of Laos.

== Bibliography ==
- Everything We Had: An Oral History of the Vietnam War. Random House. (1981) ISBN 0394512693 OCLC 7175474
- To Bear Any Burden: The Vietnam War, its Aftermath in the words of Americans and Southeast Asians Dutton. (1985) ISBN 0525243275 OCLC 11550472
- Refuge Denied : Problems in the Protection of Vietnamese and Cambodians in Thailand and the Admission of Indochinese Refugees into the United States. Human Rights First (1989) ISBN 9780934143202
- New Americans: An Oral History. Viking. (1990) ISBN 0670815837 OCLC 17652038
- Leading the Way:How Vietnam Veterans Rebuilt the U.S. Military. Ballantine Books. (1993) ISBN 0345374983 OCLC 28871442
- Empires of the steppe. Russia and China, from antiquity to 1912. American Foreign Policy Council (2002) OCLC 54857872
