= Wangyee Vang =

Hmong-American community leader

Colonel of the Army Wangyee Vang
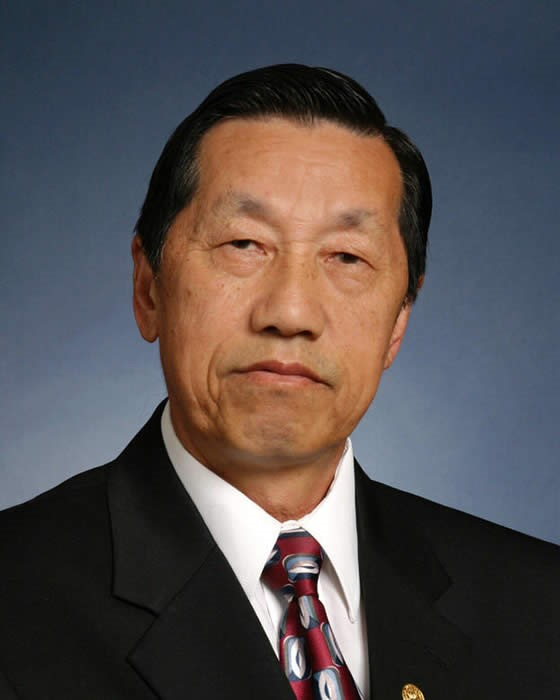
- Formal photograph of Wangyee Vang
- Born: Wangyee Vang; Xieng Khouang, Laos.
- Occupations: Com. co. Cmder (1961 - 1963); College Prof. (1969 - 1970); Chief of Staff 11th Brigade (1972); Dir. of Personnel dept. 1st Div. Inf. (1973 - 1974); Chief of staff 2nd Div. Inf. (1974 - 1975); Hmong Refugee Rep. in Thailand (1977 - 1979)

Wangyee Vang is a Hmong-American community leader, educator and elder from Fresno, and the Central Valley, of California.

== Veterans' assistance ==
Vang is the founder and National President of the Lao Veterans of America Institute, a national non-profit organization headquartered in Fresno, California, which serves Hmong-American, and Lao-American, veterans and their families. In the United States, Wangyee Vang has engaged in refugee and veterans' advocacy, education and training projects as well as efforts to integrate Indochinese refugees into American society and provide them access to social services.

During the North Vietnamese invasion of Laos and in its aftermath, Wangyee Vang served in the "U.S. Secret Army" in the Royal Kingdom of Laos during the Vietnam War and was trained as an officer in Vientiane, Laos in the Royal Lao Army. He rose to the rank of Colonel. Colonel Wangyee Vang also received military and professional training during the Vietnam War in the Kingdom of Thailand and France. He speaks Hmong, Lao, French and English.

== Citizenship for Lao and Hmong veterans ==
Wangyee Vang played a major role in Washington, D.C., and with the Lao- and Hmong-American community, along with his brother Cherzong Vang, in the research, development, advocacy, passage and implementation of the Hmong Veterans' Naturalization Act of 2000. The legislation was introduced in the U.S. Congress by U.S. Representative Bruce Vento and Senator Paul Wellstone and signed into law by President Bill Clinton.

== Laos Memorial at Arlington National Cemetery ==
In May 1997, Wangyee Vang played a key role in establishing the Laos Memorial in Arlington National Cemetery to honor Hmong and Lao veterans, and their American advisors, who served in defense of the Kingdom of Laos and U.S. national security interests during the Vietnam War.

In 2013, Wangyee Vang's brother, Cherzong Vang, of St. Paul, Minnesota, was eulogized at national veterans' memorial services at the Laos Memorial in Arlington by Lao and Hmong veterans and their former military and clandestine advisors.

== Humanitarian and refugee assistance ==
As National President of the Lao Veterans of America Institute, Wangyee Vang has worked to support Indochinese refugees, including Lao and Hmong refugees, and asylum seekers, fleeing persecution by the communist government in Laos after the end of the Vietnam War in 1975. He has been outspoken in opposition to the forced repatriation of Hmong and Lao refugees from the Royal Kingdom Thailand back to the Marxist government in Laos that they fled.

== Veterans' burial honors ==
Vang supported burial honors for Lao- and Hmong-American veterans who seek to be buried in U.S. national veterans cemeteries administered by the United States Department of Veterans Affairs. The measure is currently pending in Congress.

== See also ==
- Hmong people
- Vietnam War
- Kingdom of Laos
- Arlington National Cemetery
- Lao Veterans of America Institute
- Laos Memorial
- Lao Veterans of America
- Hmong Veterans' Naturalization Act of 2000
