= Hmong Today (TV program) =

Hmong Today is a television program that airs on KIFR in Fresno, California. Ben Vue started the television program in 1993. It was the first television channel established to serve the Hmong American community. As of 2003 the program airs on Saturday nights, with 15,000 to 20,000 viewers per airing. Because many Hmong originated from a non-literate culture, television is used to reach many of the Hmong population. The program features interviews with leaders of the Hmong community, news programming, and information for the public good. The program reached its tenth anniversary in June 2003. As part of the anniversary, Vue planned to add new programming catering to young people, including material on civic responsibilities, communication within families, development of leadership skills, and suicides of teenagers. This would result in a decrease of programming referring to economic development, education, and other general issues. To compensate for this, Vue would add material related to those subjects to his "Hmong Community Radio" program on KBIF, which was scheduled to begin in 2003.

== See also ==
- History of the Hmong in Fresno, California
