= Bruce Vento =

American politician (1940–2000)

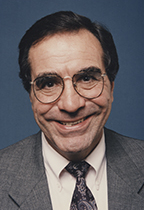

Member of the U.S. House of Representatives from Minnesota's 4th district
- In office January 3, 1977 – October 10, 2000
- Preceded by: Joseph Karth
- Succeeded by: Betty McCollum

Member of the Minnesota House of Representatives from the 66A district
- In office January 2, 1973 – January 3, 1977
- Preceded by: Willis Eken
- Succeeded by: Gene Waldorf

Member of the Minnesota House of Representatives from the 44A district
- In office January 5, 1971 – January 2, 1973
- Preceded by: John C. Chenoweth
- Succeeded by: Lyndon Carlson

Personal details
- Born: Bruce Frank Vento; October 7, 1940 Saint Paul, Minnesota, U.S.
- Died: October 10, 2000 (aged 60) Saint Paul, Minnesota, U.S.
- Party: Democratic
- Spouse(s): Mary Vento (m. 1959; div. 1993), Susan Lynch Vento (m. 2000; death 2000)
- Children: Michael Vento, Peter Vento, John Vento
- Education: University of Wisconsin-River Falls

Bruce Frank Vento (October 7, 1940 – October 10, 2000) was an American educator and politician, a Democratic-Farmer-Labor member of the United States House of Representatives from 1977 until his death in 2000, representing Minnesota's 4th congressional district.

== Early life ==
Vento was born in Saint Paul, Minnesota, and was educated at the University of Minnesota Twin Cities in Minneapolis, where he received his BA in 1961. He later, in 1965, received a B.S with honors, from the University of Wisconsin River Falls. He was a public school teacher in St. Paul, Minnesota prior to entering politics.

== Career ==
Vento served in the Minnesota House of Representatives from 1971 until 1976 before entering the House. Vento is recognized for his efforts in cleaning the environment and promoting affordable housing. He is also widely known for the McKinney-Vento Homeless Assistance Act of 1986, which provides federal money for shelter programs.

== Legacy ==
The Bruce Vento Regional Trail runs through St. Paul, Minnesota. Along this path, by the Johnson Parkway just north of Phalen Avenue, a memorial grove has also been named in his honor. The Bruce Vento Nature Sanctuary, a former railroad yard and informal trash dumping area in Lowertown St. Paul is also named for the Congressman, who lived nearby and supported this model reclamation project. East Consolidated Elementary School in St. Paul was renamed Bruce Vento Elementary School in 2000.

== Hmong Veterans' Naturalization Act ==
Vento introduced the first bill in the US Congress to grant honorary U.S. citizenship to Laotian and Hmong veterans who served in the "U.S. Secret Army" in Laos during the Vietnam War. The legislation, the Hmong Veterans' Naturalization Act of 2000 was passed by the House and Senate following his death and signed into law by President Bill Clinton. Vento worked with the Lao Veterans of America, the Lao Veterans of America Institute, the Center for Public Policy Analysis and others to research and advance the legislation in Congress, Washington, D.C., and the Lao- and Hmong-American community. Vento worked with Hmong elders and community leaders in the Twin Cities and across the United States, including Cherzong Vang, Colonel Wangyee Vang and others to build support for the legislation which took over 10 years to gain the bipartisan support for passage on Capitol Hill, Congress and the White House.

== Death ==
Vento died in 2000 while still a member of Congress from pleural mesothelioma, a rare form of lung cancer, as a result of exposure to asbestos. He had already announced that he would not run for a 13th term in 2000. Since he died a month before the election, no special election or new candidates were needed to replace him. State Representative Betty McCollum, a fellow DFLer, succeeded him.

== See also ==
- List of members of the United States Congress who died in office (2000–present)#2000s

U.S. House of Representatives
Preceded by Joseph Karth	Member of the U.S. House of Representatives from Minnesota's 4th congressional district January 3, 1977–October 10, 2000	Succeeded by Betty McCollum
