= Laos Memorial =

War memorial in Arlington National Cemetery, Washington, D.C.

Coordinates: 38°52′47.2″N 77°4′11.5″W

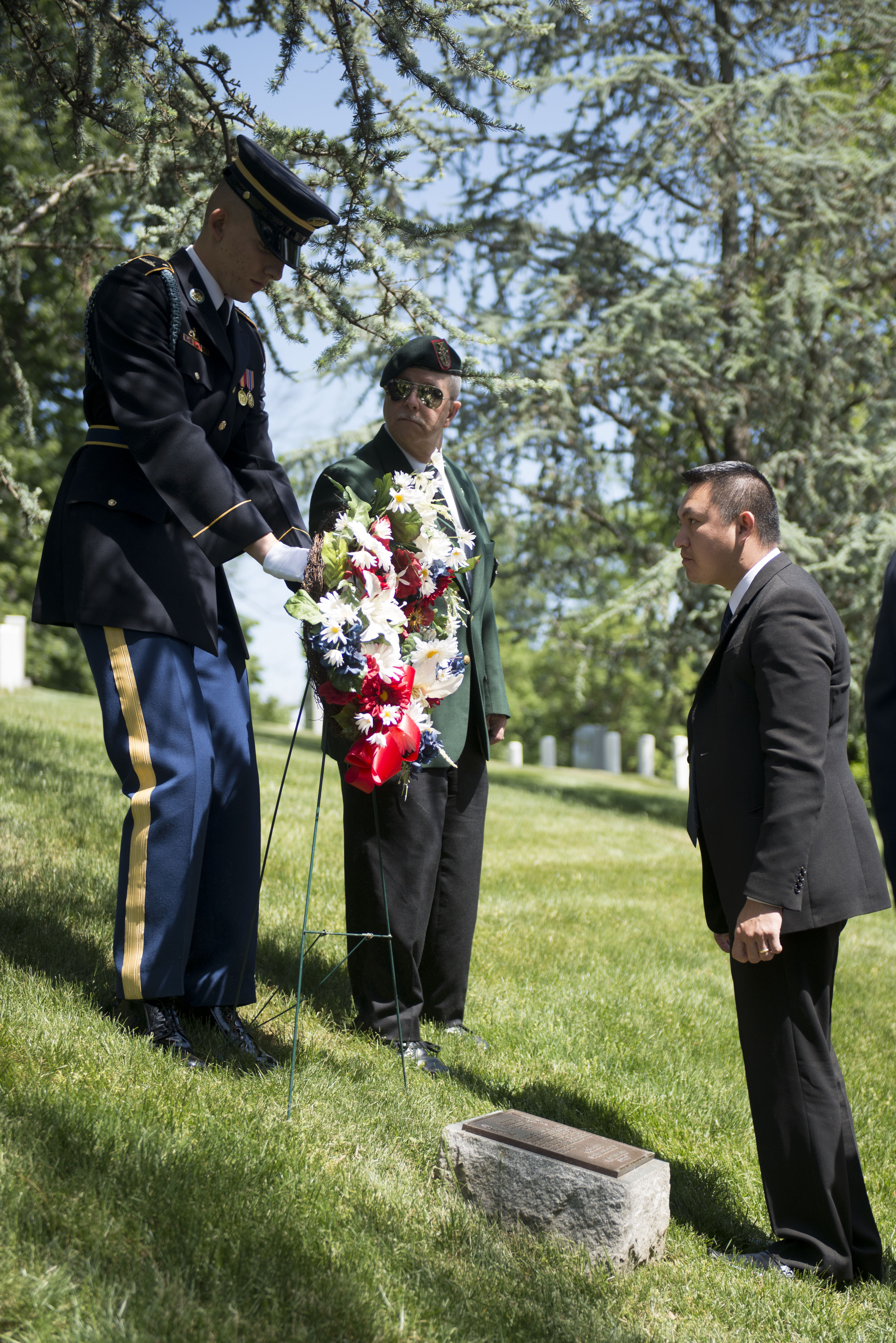
Ceremony honoring Hmong and Lao combat veterans and their American advisors at the memorial tree and plaque in Arlington National Cemetery (May 15, 2015)

The Hmong and Lao Memorial, or Lao Veterans of America Monument, is a granite monument, bronze plaque and living memorial (that includes an Atlas Cedar tree) in Arlington National Cemetery in the US. Dedicated in May 1997, it is located in Section 2 on Grant Avenue between the path to the JFK memorial and the Tomb of the Unknowns, in Arlington National Cemetery, Arlington, Virginia, in the United States. The Laos–Hmong memorial commemorates the veterans of the "Secret War" in Laos who fought against invading Soviet Union-backed North Vietnam Army forces of the People's Army of Vietnam and communist Pathet Lao guerrillas.

Approved by the U.S. Department of Defense, Arlington National Cemetery, and the U.S. Department of the Army, but designed and paid for privately by the Lao Veterans of America, Inc., the Lao Veterans of America Institute, and The Centre for Public Policy Analysis, the memorial stands as a tribute to the Hmong, Lao, other ethnic groups (Mien, Khmu, and Lahu), and American clandestine and military advisers who made up the Secret War effort during the Vietnam War. The Lao Veterans of America, Inc. is the nation's largest ethnic Laotian- and Hmong-American veterans organization.

== Significance of the memorial ==
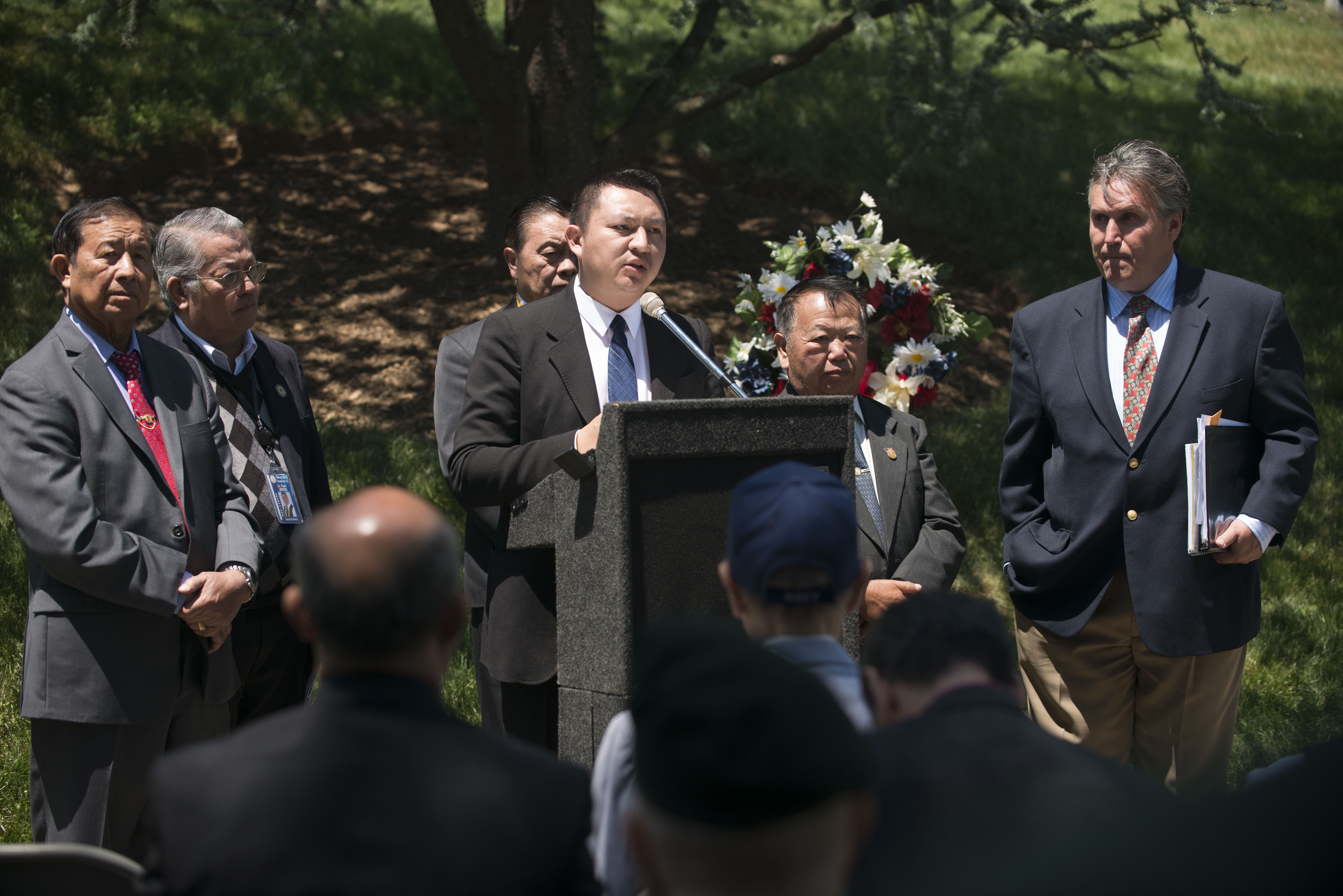
Speakers and participants give remarks during a ceremony at the Laos Memorial honoring Hmong and Lao combat veterans and their American advisors(May 15, 2015).

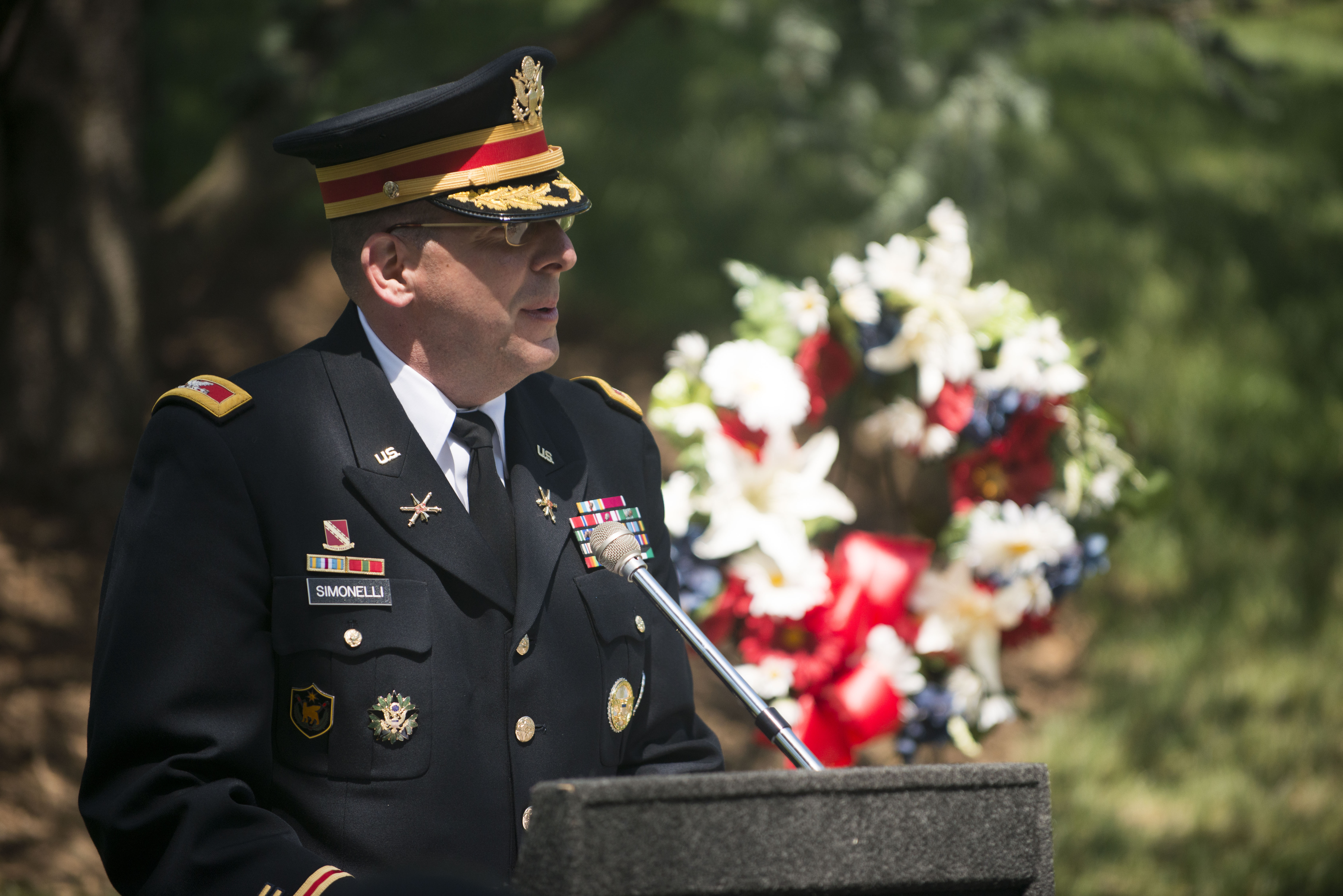
Speaking at the 2015 anniversary of the memorial's dedication, Col. Joe A. Simonelli, Chief of Staff at Arlington National Cemetery, called the event "a powerful reminder of the actions of the Hmong, Lao and American service members who fought together as allies during the Vietnam war".

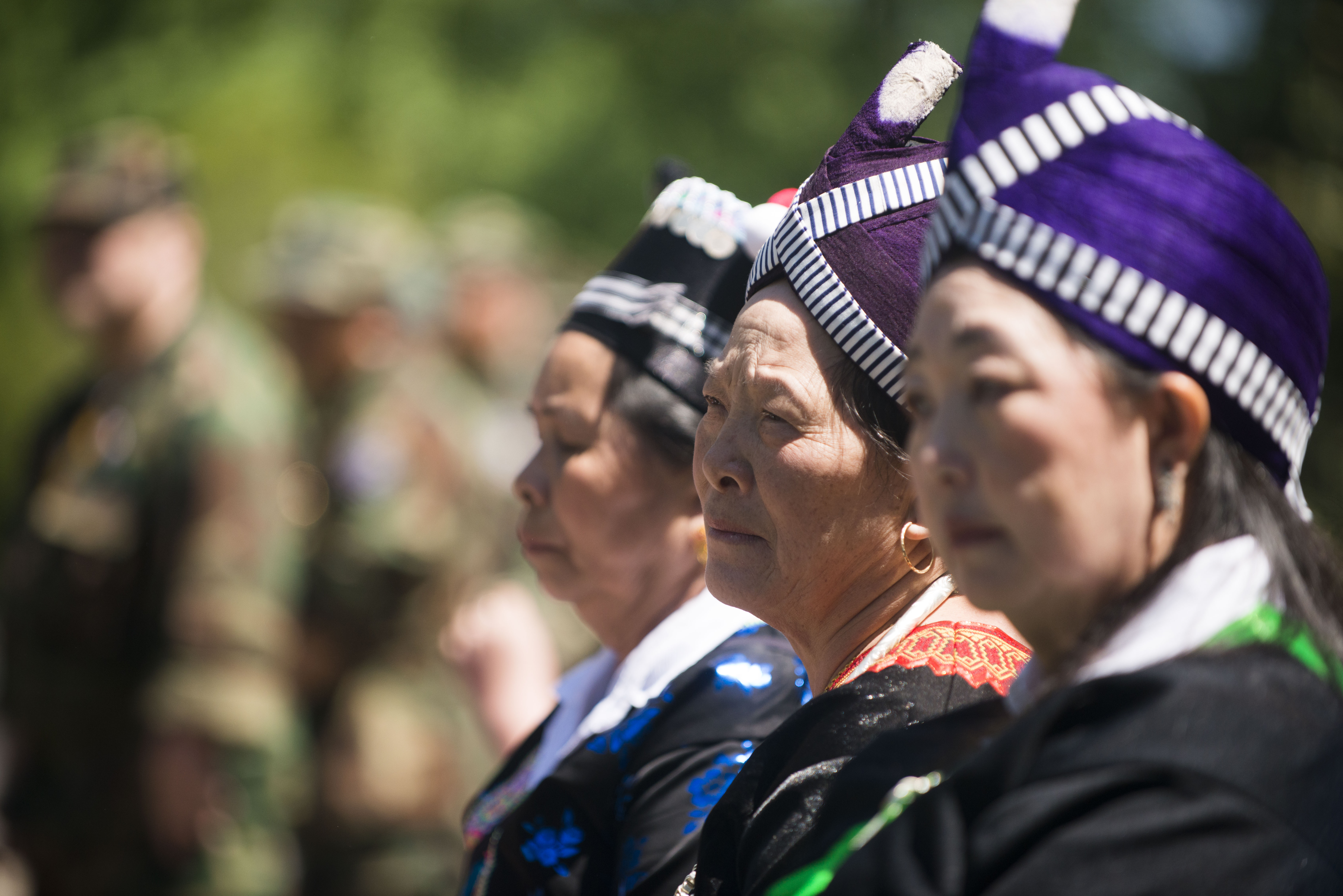
Attendees listen to speakers during a ceremony honoring Hmong and Lao combat veterans and their American advisors.

The Laos and Hmong Memorial was dedicated on May 14–15, 1997, by Colonel Wangyee Vang, National President and founder, of the Lao Veterans of America Institute, Philip Smith of the Center for Public Policy Analysis, The Centre for Public Policy Analysis (CPPA), and the Lao Veterans of America, Inc., and Grant McClure of Counterparts Veterans Association, as well as others, in an official Arlington National Cemetery veterans' ceremony attended by tens of thousands. Those attending and participating included Laotian and Hmong-American war veterans, Vietnam veterans, Lao-Hmong refugees, retired and current American government officials, Members of Congress, and U.S. supporters of the Hmong. A U.S. Department of Defense Joint Armed Services Color Guard, U.S. Army Wreath Bearer, and U.S. Army Band Bugler participated in the ceremonies.

Twenty-four years following the end of the U.S. Secret War in the Kingdom of Laos, on May 14–15, 1997, the Lao Veterans of America, Inc., Lao Veterans of America Institute, The Centre for Public Policy Analysis (CPPA), Counterparts Veterans Association, and others, formally dedicated the Laos and Hmong monument in Arlington National Cemetery. National recognition ceremonies were also organized and held at the Vietnam War Memorial and the U.S. Congress to honor the Lao and Hmong veterans, their refugee families, and their American advisers.

The Lao Veterans of America, Inc., CPPA, and the other organizations who spearheaded the dedication of the monument and the national recognition ceremonies argued that there no longer existed any national security interest in denying the Secret War's existence. These organizations worked in Washington, D.C., under the leadership of Colonel Wangyee Vang and Philip Smith, to help educate policymakers and to develop bipartisan political support for these efforts. Many Democratic and Republican members of the U.S. Congress, including key liberal and progressive Democrats, including Congressman Bruce Vento and Senator Paul Wellstone as well as Republican conservatives U.S. conservatives, rallied to support these landmark efforts to honor the Lao and Hmong veterans and their families with the dedication of the Laos and Hmong monument at Arlington National Cemetery. Many of these policymakers, including Members of Congress, also assisted the Laotian and Hmong community on others important issues, including efforts to halt and reverse the forced repatriation of Lao and Hmong refugees and asylum seekers in Southeast Asia.

Since 1997, these memorial events continue to be held annually at the Laos and Hmong Memorial in Arlington National Cemetery, the Vietnam War Memorial and the U.S. Congress.

The day, May 15, has since been viewed as an historical one, since it represents the first time that the United States government officially and publicly recognized the important and unique contributions of these soldiers who fought alongside the United States during the Vietnam War. A covert war, the contributions of the ethnic Laotians and Hmong to the U.S. war effort against the North Vietnamese Army and VietCong in Laos had been officially and repeatedly denied by the U.S. government during the Vietnam War and for over two decades following its end. Despite U.S. denials, however, the Secret War was actually the largest U.S. covert operation prior to the Soviet–Afghan War, with key areas of Laos controlled by invading communist North Vietnam's Vietnam People's Army.

At the time, some argued that the denial of the U.S. covert war, "Secret War", in the Kingdom of Laos was being used by elements within the U.S. Department of State under the Clinton administration as one key reason to wrongly justify a forced repatriation of the Hmong and Laotians from refugee camps in Thailand back to the communist regime in Laos, where they fled persecution and human rights violations. Eventually as a result as of the efforts in Washington, D.C., and Arlington National Cemetery, by the Lao Veterans of America, CPPA and other advocates and policy experts, the U.S. government formally reversed its position, acknowledging both the existence of the U.S.-led Secret War and the Lao and Hmong "Secret Army" contribution to U.S. efforts during the Vietnam War. This official reversal of U.S. policy has since been considered monumental and nearly without precedent in American foreign policy since, in acknowledging the Secret War's existence, the U.S. also implicitly acknowledged that it had lied for decades in denying that it had engaged in combat operations in Laos during the Vietnam War.

The reversal of the forced repatriation policy was subsequently supported even more vigorously by the George W. Bush Administration which strongly supported the earlier bipartisan demands of advocates, and a bipartisan coalition in the U.S. Congress (including progressives, independents and conservatives) that Thailand-based Hmong refugees from Laos be afforded U.S. immigration rights.

The Secret War was funded, and supported, by the U.S. Central Intelligence Agency's Special Activities Division and led by General Vang Pao, a Lao Hmong military leader who led the Hmong in supporting tens of thousands of U.S. air combat raids, along with major ground operations, against the North Vietnamese Army and the Pathet Lao communist guerillas in Laos during the Vietnam War. The Secret War was designed to counter North Vietnam's military supply efforts through Laos to South Vietnam, which U.S. military officials believed were core to North Vietnam's war strategy to destabilize U.S.-aligned South Vietnam. This memorial was the culmination of efforts by: Colonel Wangyee Vang, of the Lao Veterans of America Institute; Philip Smith, executive director of the Center for Public Policy Analysis, The Centre for Public Policy Analysis ( CPPA ); Grant McClure, Counterparts Veterans Association; Captain D.L. "Pappy" Hicks, Counterparts Veterans Association; and, others.

General Vang Pao was invited by the Lao Veterans of America, Inc., and the CPPA, in May 1997, to speak at the monument's dedication in Arlington National Cemetery along with others.

Following Vang Pao's death in 2011, Philip Smith and others urged, and advocated for, General Vang Pao's burial in Arlington National Cemetery to seek to honor his service to U.S. national security interests during the Vietnam War.

General Vang Pao was formally and officially honored at ceremonies at the Laos and Hmong memorial in Arlington National Cemetery in May 2011.

== Dedication words on Laos Memorial ==
The Laos Memorial is inscribed with the following words:

Dedicated to:
the U.S. Secret Army
in the Kingdom of Laos
1961 – 1973

In memory of the Hmong/Mong and Lao combat
veterans and their American advisors
who served freedom's causes in
Southeast Asia. Their patriotic valor
and loyalty in the defense of liberty and
democracy will never be forgotten.

ຈະຈາລຶກໄວັ້ຕລອດໄປ
YOV (yuav) TSHUA TXOG NEJ MUS IB TXHIS

LAOS VETERANS OF AMERICA
May 15, 1997

== Keynote speakers and public officials participation ==
Prominent current, and former, policymakers, veterans, government officials, diplomats, Members of the US Congress and others have provided remarks at the annual veterans memorial ceremony held in May of each year since 1997 at the Laos Memorial. Vietnam veteran and New York Times-best selling author Albert Santoli provided remarks at ceremonies held in May 2014.

== See also ==
- Hmong people
- Laotian Civil War
- MACVSOG
- North Vietnamese invasion of Laos
- Cherzong Vang
