= Cherzong Vang =

American Hmong community leader

Cherzong Vang (April 13, 1943 – November 10, 2012) was an American community leader from St. Paul, Minnesota. He was an elder of the Hmong people in Laos and the Lao-American community in the Twin Cities of the United States.

Cherzong worked with students, including many Hmong-American students, in the St. Paul, Minnesota school system, whose parents came to the United States in the 1970s, 1980s and 1990s as political refugees fleeing persecution by the Pathet Lao government in Laos.

== Life and career ==
Born on April 13, 1943, in Xiangkhouang Province, Laos, Cherzong Vang was one of the first Hmong educators in Laos, and the United States, and served in the U.S. "Secret Army" and Royal Lao Army in the Kingdom of Laos during the Vietnam War. He eventually received a master's degree and PhD in the United States. Vang spoke Hmong, Lao, and English.

Vang served as the Minnesota Chapter President of the Minnesota Lao Veterans of America from 1991 until 2003. He was a veterans of the Vietnam War in Laos during the North Vietnamese invasion of Laos.

Vang died on November 10, 2012, in St. Paul, Minnesota.

== Hmong Veterans Citizenship Act ==
Cherzong Vang, along with his brother Colonel Wangyee Vang, was one of the first Hmong advocates for the introduction of the Hmong Veterans' Naturalization Act of 2000 which was eventually passed by the US Congress in 2000 and signed into law by U.S. President Bill Clinton. The legislation granted honorary U.S. citizenship to tens of thousands of Lao- and Hmong-American veterans of the U.S. "Secret Army" in Laos.

He participated in the founding of the Laos Memorial and its dedication at Arlington National Cemetery on May 14–15, 1997, in Washington, D.C., and Arlington, Virginia.

== Arlington National Cemetery Veterans Memorial ==
Cherzong Vang's life was memorialized at a special veterans' memorial ceremony held at Arlington National Cemetery by Lao- and Hmong-American veterans, and their American advisors, in May 2013 in Arlington, Virginia.
