= Vang Pao =

Hmong American soldier and community leader (1929–2011)

- Vaj Pov
- Vang in 2004
- Born: 8 December 1929; Nonghet, Xiangkhouang, French Indochina
- Died: 6 January 2011 (aged 81); Clovis, California, U.S.
- Military career
- Allegiance: French Indochina; Kingdom of Laos; United States of America
- Branch: French Army; Royal Lao Army
- Service years: ?–1975
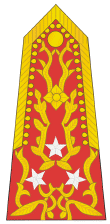
- Rank: Major general
- Commands: GCMA Laos; "Secret Army"; Commando Raiders (Military Region 2) Royal Lao Armed Forces (Military Region 2)
- Conflicts: Second Sino-Japanese War; First Indochina War; Laotian Civil War; Second Indochina War

Vang Pao (RPA: Vaj Pov [vâ pɔ̌], Lao: ວ່າງປາວ; 8 December 1929 – 6 January 2011) was a major general in the Royal Lao Army and later a leader of the Hmong American community in the United States.

== Early life ==
Vang, an ethnic Hmong, was born on 8 December 1929, in the Hmong village Nonghet, located in Central Xiangkhuang Province, in the northeastern region of Laos, where his father, Neng Chu Vang, was a county leader.

Vang began his early life as a farmer until Japanese forces invaded and occupied French Indochina in World War II. His father sent him away to school from the age of 10 to 15 before he launched his military career, joining the French military to protect fellow Hmong during the Japanese invasion.

While taking an entrance examination, the captain who was the proctor realized that Vang knew almost no written French. The captain dictated the answers to Vang so he could join the army. Anne Fadiman, author of The Spirit Catches You and You Fall Down, said Vang did not express any embarrassment over this cheating. Fadiman added "it is worth noting that in this incident, far from tarnishing Vang Pao's reputation — as, for example Ted Kennedy's fudged Spanish exam at Harvard University tarnished his — merely added to his mythology: this was the sort of man who could never be held back by such petty impediments as rules."

== Military career ==
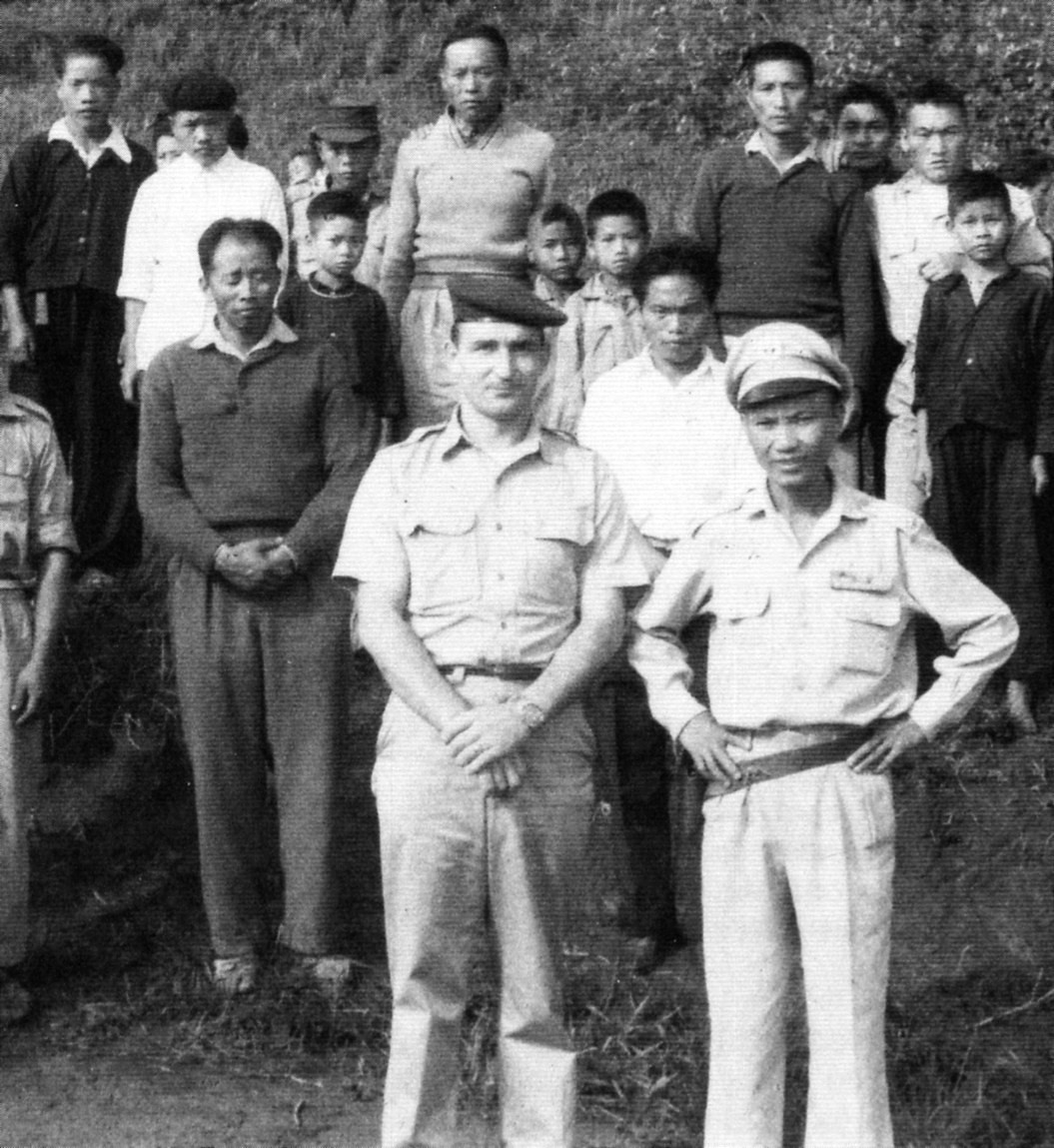
Programs Evaluation Office (PEO) adviser Jack F. Mathews with then Major Vang Pao, commander of the 10éme Bataillon de Infanterie (10 BI), at Nong Net, July 1960.

The term "Mèo Maquis" was originally used by Free French and Allied intelligence officers to describe the Hmong resistance forces working against Japanese forces occupying Indochina and China during World War II. The name was in reference to the Maquis resistance in France, with Mèo being the then-current exonym for the Hmong. After World War II, French Groupement de Commandos Mixtes Aéroportés (GCMA) authorities recruited Vang as a lieutenant during the First Indochina War to combat the Viet Minh.

He was the only ethnic Hmong to attain the rank of General officer in the Royal Lao Army, and he was loyal to the King of Laos while remaining a champion of the Hmong people. During the 1960s/70s, he commanded the Secret Army, also known as the Hmong Army, a highly effective Central Intelligence Agency-trained and supported force that fought against the Pathet Lao and People's Army of Vietnam. Vang's ethnic Hmong and Laotian veterans and their refugee families who served in the U.S. "Secret Army" were eventually granted the status of political refugees by the United Nations because of alleged persecution by the Lao Marxist government and communist Vietnam who took control in 1975. The Lao and Hmong refugees were allowed to resettle in the United States, France, Australia, New Zealand, and elsewhere. Many of Vang's former veterans formed the Lao Veterans of America, Inc. and the Lao Veterans of America Institute, with offices in Fresno, California, Washington, D.C. and other locales.

Rank	Date Of Appointment	Organization
Recruit	1947	Police Royale Laotiènne (PRL)
Corporal	1947	PRL
Sergeant	1948	PRL
Sergeant/Chef	1949	PRL
Sergeant/Chef	1950	PRL/Armée Royale du Laos (ARL)
Aspirant	1952	ARL
Second Lieutenant	1953	ARL
Lieutenant	1954	ARL
Captain	1954	ARL
Major	1956	ARL
Lieutenant Colonel	1959	ARL
Colonel	1961	ARL/L'Armee Clandestine (AC)
Brigadier General	1963	ARL/AC
Major General	1964	ARL/AC

== Immigration to the United States ==
Vang emigrated to the United States after the communists seized power in Laos in 1975. He and his wife, May Song Vang, whom he married in 1973, initially moved to Montana before settling in California. He remained widely respected by his fellow Hmong and was an esteemed elder of the American Hmong people, many of whom experienced the war or the reprisals that followed. Though he was less influential among younger Hmong-Americans who had primarily grown up in the United States, he was considered an influential leader of the U.S. Hmong community, enjoying great loyalty for his position of leadership and respect for his military accomplishments.

While in exile, Vang assembled other Lao and Hmong leaders from around the world to create the United Lao National Liberation Front (ULNF), also known as the Lao National Liberation Movement or simply the Neo Hom, to bring attention to atrocities happening in Laos and to support the political and military resistance to the government of the Lao People's Democratic Republic. He was one of the eight founders of the organization in 1981, along with Prince Sisouk na Champassak, General Phoumi Nosavan and General Kouprasith Abhay.

Thousands of Vang's former ethnic Laotian and Hmong veterans, and their refugee families, in the United States also formed the non-profit veterans and advocacy organizations the Lao Veterans of America and the Lao Veterans of America Institute. In the late 1980s and 1990s, Vang, aided by his adviser, Philip Smith, and influential American diplomatic allies, Members of Congress, and vast numbers of Hmong-Americans, helped halt the forced United Nations-sponsored repatriation back to Laos of thousands of Laotian and Hmong refugees in Thailand. It was a major human rights victory for the Hmong and Lao community and non-profit advocacy organizations who urged an end to forced repatriation, including the Center for Public Policy Analysis (CPPA) and the Lao Veterans of America.

Throughout Vang's residence in the U.S., the Hmong leader diplomatically opposed human rights violations by the communist government of Laos against the Hmong and Laotian people. He was invited to speak at the U.S. Congressional Forum on Laos, with Members of Congress, about the persecution of the Laotian and Hmong people on several occasions in the U.S. Congress from 1999 to 2003.

From 1993 to 2003, Vang relied on Philip Smith for much of his efforts with policymakers in Washington, D.C. and the U.S. Congress. Smith was a long-time friend of Vang Pao and many Laotian and Hmong American community leaders. Over time, Smith was instrumental in helping Vang to meet with key Members of Congress and senior Administration officials as well as helping to organize Congressional hearings, briefings and research missions to South East Asia. (Smith, a foreign policy, human rights and legislative affairs specialist, serves as the executive director of the Center for Public Policy Analysis.)

In March 2011, following Vang Pao's death, Smith wrote an editorial critical of the decision to not allow him to be interred in Arlington National Cemetery. Smith persisted in his efforts and the CPPA, along with the Lao Veterans of America, helped organize national veterans ceremonies in May 2011 to officially honor Vang Pao at Arlington National Cemetery.

In late November 2003 and early 2004, Vang shocked many of his closest advisers and supporters, and began to mysteriously, and abruptly, reverse his previous position in opposition to U.S. economic sanctions against the communist government of Laos. Vang, in close cooperation with one of his highly controversial sons, Cha Vang, reversed his long-standing position and began to publicly advocate normalization of U.S.-Laotian trade relations with Laos in a highly controversial move that involved secret meetings with communist Vietnamese military and political officials and complex and questionable financial dealings involving Cha Vang and others. This created suspicion and distrust among many of Pao's supporters and advisers who quickly began to abandon Vang Pao and his new direction in support of the Lao government's foreign policy, economic and military agenda. The Lao Marxist government, and hardline Pathet Lao elements in the Lao military and government, backed by the military in Vietnam, continued to engage in military attacks and human rights violations against the Hmong in Laos.

Many of Vang's former veterans and their families, whose relatives were still being persecuted and killed in Laos, opposed Vang's change of stance on the issue of Normalized Trade Relations (NTR), or Most Favored Nation Trade Status (MFN), with Laos. This included the Lao Veterans of America, the Center for Public Policy Analysis and others. Following Pao's meeting with communist generals and officials from Vietnam, Vang's so-called "New Doctrine" was widely opposed by many of his closest advisers, family, supporters, and former veterans, and many in the Lao and Hmong-American community. By 2004–05, independent journalists investigating complex financial relations, ethics probes, and scandals surrounding Cha Vang and various lawsuits. Central in the controversy, scandals, and lawsuits, including one by the Minnesota Attorney General, was Cha Vang's role with the Vang Pao Foundation, a funeral home, a chamber of commerce in St. Paul, and other financial and political dealings. The Minnesota Star Tribune and St. Paul Pioneer Press reported extensively on these matters.

The Vang Pao Foundation was forced to close following investigation by authorities and a lawsuit by the attorney general of Minnesota.

Thailand-based Laotian and Hmong refugees, many of whom had been living at formal and informal refugee camps including Wat Tham Krabok, a Buddhist temple in Thailand, were afforded the right to avoid the forced return to Laos and instead over 15,000 were offered relocation rights and assistance to the U.S. in 2004 and 2005.

== Coup d'état conspiracy ==
On 4 June 2007, following a lengthy federal investigation labeled "Operation Tarnished Eagle", warrants were issued by U.S. federal courts ordering the arrest of Vang Pao and nine others for allegedly plotting to overthrow the Pathet Lao communist government of Laos, in violation of the federal Neutrality Acts. Following the issuance of the warrants, an estimated 250 federal agents representing numerous U.S. federal law enforcement and other agencies conducted simultaneous raids on homes, offices and other locations throughout central and southern California, arresting Vang and nine other individuals. The federal charges alleged that members of the group inspected weapons, including AK-47s, smoke grenades, and Stinger missiles, with the intent of purchasing them and smuggling them into Thailand, where they allegedly would be shipped to anti-Laotian governmental resistance movement forces inside Laos. The one non-Hmong person among the nine arrested, Harrison Jack, a 1968 West Point graduate and retired Army infantry officer, allegedly attempted to recruit Special Operations veterans to act as mercenaries in an invasion of Laos.

On 15 June 2007, defendants were indicted by a grand jury and an 11th man was arrested in connection with the alleged plot. The defendants faced possible life terms for violation of the U.S. Neutrality Act and various weapons charges. Vang and the other Hmong were initially denied bail by the California federal court, which cited each of them as a flight risk. Since the 4 June 2007 federal raid, the arrests became the subject of mounting criticism. His fellow friends, including Hmong, Mienh, Lao, Vietnamese, and Americans individuals who knew Vang protested the arrests, rallying in California, Minnesota, Michigan, North Carolina and Wisconsin. Several of Vang's high-level U.S. supporters criticized the California court that issued the arrest warrants. In 2009 all of the federal charges against Vang Pao were dropped.

Prior to his arrest, Vang was scheduled to have an elementary school in Madison, Wisconsin named after him, a proposal that met with opposition over historian Alfred W. McCoy's allegations that Vang had been involved in war crimes and drug trafficking, with Hmong scholars Gary Yia Lee and Jane Hamilton-Merritt, as well as former Air America Association president Jack Knott, strongly disputing his claims. Pao's June 2007 arrest later led the Madison School to reopen discussion on the school's naming. On 18 June 2007, the Madison Metropolitan School District Board of Education voted to drop Vang's name from the new school, in light of the federal charges against him and the previous allegations. Nonetheless, in 2012 another school district, the Fresno Unified School District, voted unanimously to name a new elementary school after him the year after his passing.

=== Release from jail ===
On 12 July 2007, the California federal court ordered the release of the Hmong leader on a US$1.5 million bond secured by property owned by members of his family. Many Hmong had participated in numerous protests over several weeks in California and elsewhere, calling for Pao's release from the date of his incarceration until his release under bail nearly a month later.

=== Return to court ===
On 9 March 2009, Vang's lawyers filed a motion seeking to dismiss the charges against him. His lawyers claimed that the charges were fabricated and had no bearing in court. Following this appearance, on 6 April 2009, federal prosecutors denied all allegations of fabrications in the motion. That following month, on 11 May 2009, Vang Pao returned to federal court in Sacramento, California with his lawyers to argue the motion. Judge Frank Damrell stated, after hearing the arguments for the motion, that there was insufficient evidence from the defense to justify a dismissal.

=== Dropping of charges ===
On 18 September 2009, the federal government dropped all charges against Vang Pao, announcing in a release that the federal government was permitted to consider "the probable sentence or other consequences if the person is convicted." Vang Pao's long-time adviser and friend Philip Smith hailed the federal government's decision to drop the charges against Vang and the other accused Hmong-American defendants. Following Vang's arrest, Smith advocated in Washington, D.C. for the case to be dropped against Vang and other Hmong leaders. Smith raised repeated public concerns that the U.S. Justice Department and U.S. Department of State, would be putting themselves and the U.S. government on trial, for its betrayal and abandonment of the Hmong people during the conclusion of the Vietnam War and its aftermath when many Hmong were killed or imprisoned by the Lao communist government that prevailed in the conflict.

At special sessions of the U.S. Congressional Forum on Laos, Smith and the Center for Public Policy Analysis joined by Members of Congress, including U.S. Representative Dana Rohrabacher, and others, called on the U.S. Department of Justice to immediately drop the case, and the charges, against General Vang and the other Hmong defendants, especially in light of the Lao government's and Lao Peoples Army's (LPA) ongoing military attacks and egregious human rights violations directed against many of the Laotian and Hmong people, which included attacks on unarmed civilians and political and religious dissidents, atrocities, rape, torture and the use of mass starvation.

Amnesty International and other human rights organizations and experts testified about their research efforts, along with Members of Congress, including U.S. Congressman Patrick J. Kennedy, U.S. Senator Norm Coleman, at the special Congressional Forums on Laos held in the U.S. Congress and Library of Congress.

== Personal life ==
Vang Pao reportedly had at least 25 children by several wives, and spoke English, French, and Hmong besides his native Lao, although in later years in interviews he did not seem to use the language as much anymore. Diana Aguilera of the Fresno Bee wrote that May Song Vang, who was Vang Pao's wife at the time of his death, "became the face of the Hmong community" after Vang Pao died.

== Death ==
Vang, who battled diabetes and heart disease, died at age 81 from pneumonia with cardiac complications on 6 January 2011, at Clovis Community Medical Center, in Clovis, California. He was admitted to the hospital on 26 December 2010, after attending Hmong New Year celebrations in Fresno. A hospital spokesman said his family was at the hospital at the time of Vang's death.

Traditional Hmong funeral services for Vang were scheduled to be held for six days, starting 4 February 2011, at the Fresno Convention Center. More than 10,000 Hmong mourned on the first day of the funeral. After several funeral days, it was estimated that over 40,000 attended during the service of his funeral A committee unanimously voted against a request to bury Vang Pao at Arlington National Cemetery; he was subsequently buried near Los Angeles at Forest Lawn Cemetery in Glendale, California.

== Legacy ==
In March 2011, following Vang's death, the CPPA issued an editorial, published in the Minneapolis Star Tribune, critical of the decision by the U.S. Secretary of the Army not permitting Vang's burial in Arlington National Cemetery. Despite the U.S. Secretary of the Army's decision, the CPPA, along with the Lao Veterans of America Institute, Lao Veterans of America, Inc. (LVA), and others helped to organize national veterans ceremonies at Arlington National Cemetery in May 2011 to honor Vang's contribution to U.S. national security efforts during the Vietnam War. The Lao Veterans of America, Philip Smith, the CPPA and other prominent figures also highlighted and lauded Vang Pao's contribution to U.S. national security interests during the Vietnam War.

In May 2011, Vang's efforts during the Vietnam War were officially commemorated at memorial ceremonies in Arlington National Cemetery organized by the Lao Veterans of America Institute, LVA, the CPPA, the U.S. Department of Defense, U.S. Special Forces Association, and others. Participants at the special ceremony held at the Laos Memorial within Arlington National Cemetery included the CPPA, LVA, U.S. Department of Defense, U.S. Department of the Army, Members of the Congress, U.S. Special Forces Association, Counterparts Veterans Association and others. General Vang's son, Chong Vang, spoke at the ceremony along with Colonel Wangyee Vang, Philip Smith, Captain D.L. "Pappy Hicks", U.S. Special Forces Association, and others.

Vang's likeness is memorialized by numerous monuments across the United States, including statues at the San Joaquin County Fairground in Stockton, California and outside the City Council Chamber in Chico, California.

== See also ==
- Ban Phou Pheung Noi
- Battle of Lima Site 85
- The Center for Public Policy Analysis
- Groupement de Commandos Mixtes Aéroportés
- History of Laos since 1945
- History of the Hmong in Fresno, California
- Ho Chi Minh trail
- Lao Human Rights Council
- Lao Veterans of America
- Laos Memorial
- Lee Lue
- North Vietnamese invasion of Laos
- Raven FACs
