= Lao Veterans of America =

Veterans service organization

The Lao Veterans of America, Inc., describes itself as a non-profit, non-partisan, non-governmental, veterans organization that represents Lao- and Hmong-American veterans who served in the U.S. clandestine war in the Kingdom of Laos during the Vietnam War as well as their refugee families in the United States.

== Vietnam War and the Kingdom of Laos ==
Members of the Lao Veterans of America, Inc., (LVA) served in the U.S. clandestine war in the Kingdom of Laos during the North Vietnamese invasion of Laos and Vietnam War. These veterans served in the U.S. "Secret Army" in Laos, as well as the Royal Lao Army, and are largely recruits from the ethnic Hmong people, and other Laotian tribal minority peoples, as well as ethnic lowland Lao. They engaged in combat operations, and provided support, for key U.S. covert air and ground operations including Operation Barrel Roll against the North Vietnamese Army and People's Army of Vietnam and communist Pathet Lao forces. Laotian and Hmong soldiers, first backed and armed by President John F. Kennedy, the United States Central Intelligence Agency (CIA), and U.S. Department of Defense, also interdicted North Vietnamese forces and supplies on the Ho Chi Minh Trail in Laos.

== American clandestine and Special Forces advisers ==
CIA clandestine and U.S. military leaders, officers, operatives and advisers to the U.S. Secret Army in Laos included notable U.S. national security figures including: William Colby, Richard Helms, Theodore Shackley, Anthony Poshepny, Lawrence Devlin and others. The Lao Veterans of America's members worked in cooperation with many of these figures during the Vietnam War in Laos and its aftermath.

Tens of thousands of Laotian and Hmong veterans, and their families, fled the communist Pathet Lao takeover of Laos in 1975 as refugees, and were eventually granted political asylum, and resettled in the United States, including Lao Hmong leader General Vang Pao.

Philip Smith, serves as the Washington, D.C. Director and Liaison for the Lao Veterans of America, Inc., and has advocated on a variety of issues for the Laotian and Hmong-American community as well as representing the organization in the US Congress and on Capitol Hill. Smith has acted as Washington, D.C. Director for the LVA since the early 1990s.

== Laos Memorial at Arlington National Cemetery ==
On May 14–15, 1997, twenty-two years after the end of the Vietnam War in Laos, a monument to the Lao and Hmong veterans and their American advisers who served in the Kingdom in Laos was during the Vietnam War was finally authorized by Arlington National Cemetery. The Lao Veterans of America, its Washington, D.C. Director, Philip Smith, and others, as well as tens of thousands of LVA members and their families, dedicated the monument in Arlington National Cemetery. The LVA's Laotian and Hmong veterans also received national recognition at the Vietnam War Memorial for their covert service. It was the first time that the United States acknowledged its covert role in Laos and the role of the Lao and Hmong veterans who served in the "U.S. Secret Army."

Thousands of Lao and Hmong-American veterans from across the United States and their families participated in the Arlington and Washington, D.C., national recognition ceremonies.

The Lao Veterans of America, in cooperation with The Centre for Public Policy Analysis, and others, continues to host annual veterans memorial ceremonies in Washington, D.C., and Arlington National Cemetery at the Laos Memorial, each May, to honor the Lao and Hmong-American veterans, their refugee families, and their American U.S. Special Forces and clandestine advisers.

In May 2013, prominent Hmong-American Dr. Cherzong Vang, a former Minnesota President of the Lao Veterans of America was honored at veterans memorial ceremonies held at the Laos Memorial in Arlington by a jointed U.S. Armed Services honor guard along with Members of the US Congress and other officials.

On May 15, 2015, Lao- and Hmong-American veterans and their families from across the United States held a special 40th anniversary veterans memorial service in Arlington National Cemetery to mourn the fall of the Royal Kingdom of Laos to invading North Vietnamese Army forces of the People's Army of Vietnam and communist Pathet Lao guerrillas. The ceremony included representatives and Green Berets of the U.S. Special Forces Association who served in Laos, Members of Congress and others.

== Honorary citizenship ==
From its inception in the early 1990s, the Lao Veterans of America, Inc. played a leadership role in the research, development, introduction and passage of the Hmong Veterans' Naturalization Act of 2000.

In 2000, after a 10-year battle in the U.S. Congress, President Bill Clinton signed into law the Hmong Veterans' Naturalization Act of 2000 to grant honorary citizenship to Lao and Hmong-American veterans of the U.S. "Secret Army." The bill was introduced by U.S. Congressman Bruce Vento (D-MN) of St. Paul, Minnesota, with bipartisan support from prominent Republicans, including Congressmen Lamar Smith (R-TX) of Texas and Henry Hyde of Illinois (R-IL), and others. The Lao Veterans of America, and its Washington Director Philip Smith, engaged in a decade-long bipartisan effort in the U.S. Congress, and with Democratic and Republican Administrations in the White House, to promote the bill's passage and final implementation. The legislation took years to gain bipartisan U.S. Congressional approval before it was signed into law. The LVA and Philip Smith worked to organize policy events and rallies on Capitol Hill, Washington, D.C., Virginia, California, Minnesota, Wisconsin, Pennsylvania, Rhode Island, North Carolina, and other states in support of the legislation. Senator Paul Wellstone (D-MN) of Minnesota, and a bipartisan coalition, introduced the bill in the U.S. Senate.

Congressman Vento died of lung cancer the year the bill was signed into law. The Lao Veterans of America led efforts to memorialize Congressman Vento's legacy and assistance to the Lao- and Hmong veterans and their refugee families.

An additional bill to assist Lao- and Hmong-American widows of veterans was later introduced and passed into law with the Lao Veterans of America again advocating in Congress and Washington, D.C., for passage of the legislation.

== Opposition to human rights violations ==
Working with Amnesty International, Human Rights Watch, the Lao Human Rights Council, and other human rights organizations, the Lao Veterans of America, and its Washington D.C. Director Philip Smith, have been active in Washington, D.C., and policy-making circles in staunch opposition to human rights violations, ethnic cleansing, and political and religious liberty and religious freedom persecution directed against the Lao and Hmong people by the Marxist-Leninist government of Laos and Socialist Republic of Vietnam (SRV). In the 1990s, 2000s and 2010s, for nearly three decades, the Lao Veterans of America has also been active in opposition to the forced repatriation of Lao and Hmong refugees from Thailand back to the communist government in Laos that the refugees fled. In the late 1980s, 1990s and 2000s, the LVA participated in research missions, along with Members of Congress, and the Centre for Public Policy Analysis to Lao and Hmong refugee camps along the Mekong River and the Buddhist temple of Wat Tham Krabok to help document human rights violations under the Marxist regime in Laos and to seek to halt and reverse the forced repatriation policy directed against political refugees and asylum seekers in Thailand and Southeast Asia. The LVA has raised repeated concerns about the ongoing role of the SRV and Vietnamese People's Army (VPA in support of the Pathet Lao Marxist government in Laos, especially with regard to illegal logging, human rights violations, military attacks against Hmong civilians and political and religious dissident groups, and religious persecution.

The Lao Veterans of America and its Washington Director Philip Smith have raised concerns about Laotian- and Hmong-American citizens who have been abducted or disappeared in Laos at the hand of communist Lao police or military officials including Houa Ly of the Green Bay area of Wisconsin and Michael Vang of Fresno, California who disappeared in April 1999 along the border of Thailand and Laos. Former U.S. Congressman Mark Andrew Green, former Congressman George Radanovich, and former Congressman Tom Lantos, held various hearings in the U.S. Congress about the Lao government's role in abducting the two Hmong-American men and other serious human rights violations in Marxist Laos and Thailand. As of 2013, the two Hmong-American men, who are U.S. citizens, are still missing at the hands of communist officials in Laos along with other U.S. citizens, including Mr. Hakit Yang, of St. Paul, Minnesota and additional two of his colleagues, Mr. Cong Shi Neng Yang and Trillion Yunhaison. Mr. Hakit Yang and his two colleagues from Minnesota were held at Phonthong Prison in Vientiane, Laos. Human rights advocates Kerry and Kay Danes, Amnesty International, The Centre for Public Policy Analysis, and the LVA helped to draw awareness to their plight and human rights violations in Laos directed against the Lao and Hmong people.

== Official Recognition by the U.S. Congress - House and Senate ==
In 2002, the US Senate and US House unanimously passed special bills, including H. Con. Res. 406, to honor and recognize the Lao Veterans of America.

== Hmong Veterans' Service Recognition Act & Burial Honors Efforts in US Congress ==
Members of Congress, and the Lao Veterans of America, are seeking to further honor Lao- and Hmong-American veterans who served during the Vietnam War and are requesting that the U.S. government authorize these veterans, upon their death, to be buried in U.S. national veterans cemeteries administered by the Department of Veterans Affairs. Bills are pending in the U.S. Congress for this purpose introduced by Senator Lisa Murkowski of Alaska and Congressman Jim Costa of California.

In May and July 2013, the U.S. Senate Veterans Affairs Committee, led by Senators Bernie Sanders and Richard Burr, held a full committee hearing of the "Lao Hmong Veterans Burial Honors Bill." The potential Senate passage of legislation addressing, and studying, the plight of the Lao and Hmong veterans of the "U.S. Secret Army" in Laos seeking burial honors at U.S. national veterans cemeteries has been reported in Washington, D.C. and on Capitol Hill

Philip Smith, provided testimony on behalf of the Lao Veterans of America at the U.S. Senate Veterans Affairs Committee.

In 2014, the Senate Veterans Affairs Committee, led by Bernard Sanders, and the bill's other Senate cosponsors, included the burial honors bill into a very large. and comprehensive omnibus veterans bill. However, spending disputes about funding the much larger veterans affairs bill led to its defeat. Nevertheless, the stand-alone bill continued to gain bipartisan support and cosponsors in the House and Senate as the result of the Lao Veterans of America and others continuing to raise awareness of the legislation in Washington, D.C.

In 2014, in the U.S. House of Representatives, the bill continued to gain bipartisan support, from both Republicans and Democrats, and additional official Congressional cosponsors, who signed on the legislation in significant numbers. Also, in 2014, the pending legislation was officially named "The Hmong Veterans' Service Recognition Act" by Members of the US Congress who introduced and officially cosponsored the bill.

== Support for Filipino veterans of World War II ==
Since the 1990s, the Lao Veterans of America, has repeatedly worked with, and supported, the efforts of World War II veterans of the U.S.-backed forces in the Philippines to educate the US Congress about their unique contribution and unique relationship with the US Department of Defense during the Second World War. On a numerous occasions, and within the context of the Bataan Death March, and other extraordinary sacrifices during World War II, the LVA has joined in support of the Filipino veterans efforts in Washington, D.C., Congress, and Capitol Hill to seek U.S. veterans honors and benefits.

== See also ==
- United League for Democracy in Laos
