= North Vietnamese invasion of Laos =

Campaign of the Vietnam War (1958–1959)

North Vietnamese invasion of the Kingdom of Laos
- Part of the Laotian Civil War and the Vietnam War
Date	1958–1959
Location	Kingdom of Laos
Result	North Vietnamese and Pathet Lao victory; Beginning of the Ho Chi Minh trail; Start of the Local War Phase; Start of the Laotian Civil War

Belligerents
Kingdom of Laos	North Vietnam (Laos) Pathet Lao

Commanders and leaders
(Laos) Souvanna Phouma (Laos) Phoui Sananikone (Laos) Vang Pao	(North Vietnam) Hồ Chí Minh (North Vietnam) Võ Nguyên Giáp (North Vietnam) Phạm Văn Đồng

North Vietnam supported the Pathet Lao to fight against the Kingdom of Laos between 1958 and 1959. Control over Laos allowed for the eventual construction of the Ho Chi Minh trail that would serve as the main supply route for enhanced NLF (the National Liberation Front, the Viet Cong) and NVA (North Vietnamese Army) activities in South Vietnam. As such, the support for Pathet Lao to fight against the Kingdom of Laos by North Vietnam would prove decisive in the eventual communist victory over South Vietnam in 1975 as the South Vietnamese and American forces could have prevented any NVA and NLF deployment and resupply if these only happened over the 17th Parallel, also known as the Demilitarized Zone (DMZ), a narrow strip of land between North and South Vietnam that was closely guarded by both sides. It also helped the Pathet Lao win against the Kingdom of Laos, even though the Kingdom of Laos had American support.

== Prelude to conflict ==
Souvanna Phouma announced that, with the holding of elections, the Royal Lao Government had fulfilled the political obligations it had assumed at Geneva, and the International Control Commission (ICC) adjourned sine die. Phoui Sananikone, less scrupulous about preserving Laos's neutrality than his predecessor, angered Moscow and Hanoi by admitting diplomats from Taipei and Saigon.

The Soviet Union and North Vietnam, already upset by the departure of the ICC, which they had seen as a restraining influence, protested. The United States worked out an agreement with France that reduced the role of the French military mission and enlarged that of the Programs Evaluation Office, which embarked on a major strengthening of its staff and functions.

== Occupation of Lao villages by North Vietnam and Pathet Lao (December 1958) ==
The occupation in December 1958 by North Vietnamese and Pathet Lao security forces of several villages in Tchepone District near the Demilitarized Zone (DMZ) between North Vietnam and South Vietnam was an ominous development. The Laos government immediately protested the flying of the North Vietnamese flag on Laotian territory. Hanoi claimed the villages had historically been part of Vietnam.

With regard to precedent, this was a decidedly modest claim - nonetheless, it represented a unilateral reinterpretation of the French map used by the Truong Gia Armistice Commission in the summer of 1954 to draw the DMZ, and, backed by force of arms, constituted nothing less than aggression. Phoui received extraordinary powers from the National Assembly to deal with the crisis. But the failure to regain their lost territory rankled the Laotian nationalists, who were hoping for a greater degree of United States assistance.

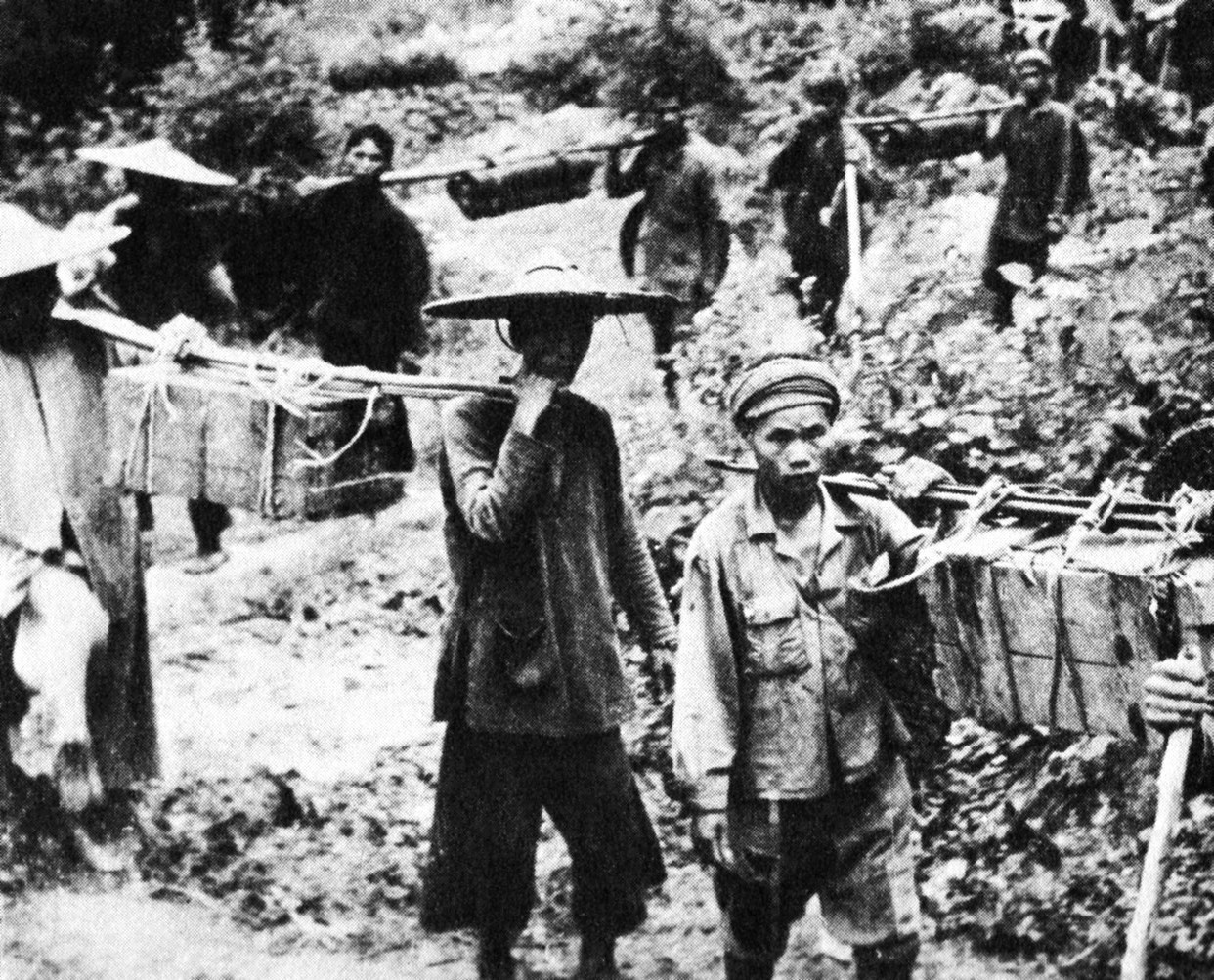
The Ho Chi Minh trail from the very beginning was using Vietnamese and Laotian people as seen in a captured Vietcong's photo, circa 1959

One of Washington's major preoccupations was the danger that the Royal Lao Army would integrate the Pathet Lao troops without the safeguard of "screening and reindoctrinating" them. The embassy was instructed to tell the government that it would be difficult to obtain congressional approval of aid to Laos with communists in the Royal Lao Army. Before the final integration of 1,500 Pathet Lao troops (two battalions) into the Royal Lao Army could take place as planned in May 1959, the Pathet Lao used a quibble about officer ranks to delay the final ceremony.

As monsoon rains swept over the Plain of Jars one night, one of the two battalions slipped away, followed soon after by the other, near Louangphrabang. The event signaled a resumption of hostilities. In July, Phoui's government, after protracted cabinet deliberations, ordered the arrest of the LPF deputies in Vientiane--Souphanouvong, Nouhak, Phoumi Vongvichit, Phoun Sipaseut, Sithon Kommadan, Singkapo, and others. Tiao Souk Vongsak evaded arrest.

== North Vietnamese and Pathet Lao attack (1959) ==
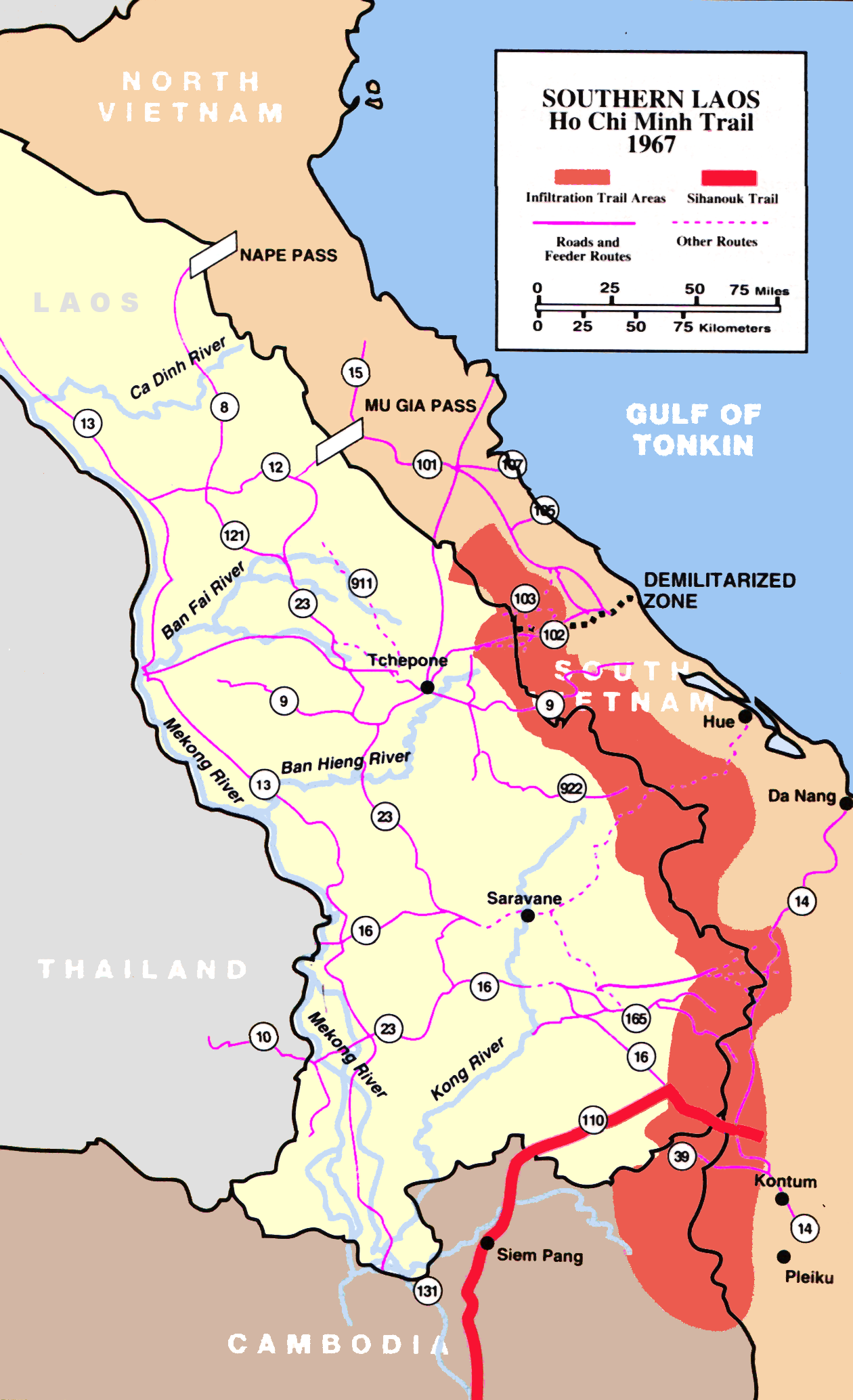
The Ho Chi Minh Trail running through Laos, 1967.

Fighting broke out all along the border with North Vietnam. North Vietnamese Army regular units participated in attacks on July 28–31, 1959. These operations established a pattern of North Vietnamese forces leading the attack on a strong point, then falling back and letting the Pathet Lao remain in place once resistance to the advance had been broken. The tactic had the advantage of concealing the North Vietnamese presence from view.

Rumors of North Vietnamese in the vicinity often had a terrifying effect. Among the men who heard such rumors in the mountains of Houaphan Province that summer was a young Royal Lao Army captain named Kong Le. Kong Le had two companies of the Second Paratroop Battalion out on patrol almost on the North Vietnamese border. When they returned to Xam Nua without encountering the enemy, they found that the garrison had decamped, leaving the town undefended.

Direct North Vietnamese involvement in Laos began taking another form wherein aggression was difficult to prove. Two months after the 1954 Geneva Conference on Indochina, the North Vietnamese established a small support group known as Group 100, on the Thanh Hoa-Houaphan border at Ban Namèo. This unit provided logistical and other support to Pathet Lao forces.

In view of the reversion to a fighting strategy, the North Vietnamese and Lao parties decided to establish an upgraded unit. The new unit, known as Group 959, headquartered at Na Kai, just inside the Houaphan border, began operating in September 1959. Its establishment coincided with a major effort to expand the hitherto small Pathet Lao forces.

According to an official history published after the war, its mission was "serving as specialists for the Military Commission and Supreme Command of the Lao People's Liberation Army, and organizing the supplying of Vietnamese matériel to the Laotian revolution and directly commanding the Vietnamese volunteer units operating in Sam Neua, Xiangkhouang, and Vientiane." These actions were in violation of the obligation Ho Chi Minh's government had assumed as a participant in the 1954 Geneva Conference to refrain from any interference in the internal affairs of Laos.

The Vietnamese party's strategy was by now decided with regard to South Vietnam. At the same time, the party outlined a role for the LPP that was supportive of North Vietnam, in addition to the LPP's role as leader of the revolution in Laos. Hanoi's southern strategy opened the first tracks through the extremely rugged terrain of Xépôn district in mid-1959 of what was to become the Ho Chi Minh Trail.

Phetsarath and Sisavang Vong, viceroy and king, died within two weeks of each other in October 1959.

== See also ==
- Air America (airline)
- Battle of Lima Site 85 (March 1968)
- Vietnamese-Laotian War (1479–80)
- Hmong people
- Pathet Lao
- Laotian Civil War
- Royal Lao Armed Forces
- Royal Lao Army Airborne
- Vietnam War
