= Laotian Americans =

Americans of Laotian birth or descent

Laotian Americans ຄົນລາວອາເມລິກາ

Total population
- 245,045 (2023)

Regions with significant populations
- Sacramento, California area • San Francisco Bay Area (esp. Oakland) • Twin Cities, Minnesota • Dallas-Fort Worth area • Fresno and Central California • San Diego • Chicago, Illinois • Nashville, Tennessee • Seattle area • Portland, Oregon • Los Angeles area • Piedmont Triad, North Carolina

Languages
- Lao, American English, French, Isan, Thai

Religion
- Theravada Buddhism, Christianity, Shamanism, Animism

Related ethnic groups
- Lao people, overseas Laotian, Laotians in France, Laotian Canadians, Asian Americans,

Laotian Americans (Lao: ຄົນລາວອາເມລິກາ, romanized: Khonlav Amelika) are Americans who trace their ancestry to Laos. Laotian Americans are included in the larger category of Asian Americans. The primary generation of Laotian immigrants in the US were generally those who escaped Laos during the Laotian Civil War by crossing the Mekong River into Thailand. Many Lao refugees subsequently emigrated to the United States during the late 1970s and throughout the 1980s.

The category ‘Laotian American' in the US Census largely included ethnic Lao, and did not include the Hmong and other ethnic minorities from Laos.

== History ==
Laotian immigration to the United States started shortly after the Vietnam War. Refugees began arriving in the U.S. after a Communist government came to power in Laos in 1975 and by 1980, the Laotian population of the U.S. reached 47,683, according to census estimates. The numbers increased dramatically during the 1980s so the census estimated that there were 147,375 people by 1990. The group continued to grow, somewhat more slowly, to 167,792 by 2000. By 2008, the population nearly reached 240,532. Included are the Hmong, a mountainous tribe from that country.

== Demographics ==
The states with the largest Laotian American populations (including the Hmong from Laos) are California (58,424, 0.2%), Texas (13,298, 0.1%), Minnesota (10,065, 0.2%), Washington (9,333, 0.2%), Colorado (7,434, 0.1%), Tennessee (6,336, 0.1%), Illinois (5,822, 0.1%), North Carolina (5,566, 0.1%), Georgia (5,560, 0.1%), Florida (4,896, 0.05%), and Oregon (4,692, 0.1%). There are about over 200,000 ethnic Lao in America. Approximately 8,000 to 11,000 Americans are of mixed Lao and other descent. Ethnic Lao people may identify as both Lao American and Laotian American (see also Hmong American).

Most were estimated to live in the West (95,574), followed by the South (44,471), Midwest (37,820), and Northeast (15,382).

Cities or regions with significant Laotian-American populations include the Seattle metropolitan area (enumerating 12,190; 0.4% of its population); San Francisco Bay Area (11,545; 0.2%); Dallas–Fort Worth metropolitan area (10,500; 0.2%); Sacramento metropolitan area (9,814; 0.4%); Minneapolis – Saint Paul area (8,676; 0.3%); San Diego metropolitan area (8,079; 0.3%); Fresno metropolitan area (7,967; 0.9%); Greater Los Angeles Area (7,120; 0.04%); Nashville metropolitan area (6,210; 0.4%); Portland metropolitan area (5,806; 0.3%); Chicago metropolitan area (4,762; 0.05%); San Joaquin County, California (4,266; 0.6%); Providence, Rhode Island (3,456; 0.2%); Denver metropolitan area (2,673), Des Moines, Iowa (2,270), Anchorage metropolitan area (1,997; 0.5%), and Fort Smith, Arkansas-Arkoma, Oklahoma (1,730).

Smaller Laotian communities can be found in other cities and metropolitan areas across the United States. In the Southern United States, there is a significant Laotian community in St. Petersburg, Florida, where at least 1,000 Laotian-Americans reside. There are communities in Habersham County, Georgia (740), and Houston, Texas.

In the Southwestern and Midwestern United States, there are Laotian communities in Denver, Colorado; Storm Lake, Iowa (400; 4%), and Wichita, Kansas (1,594; 0.4%). The Oaklawn-Sunview community near Wichita is 11.5% Laotian American. In the Chicago area, there are sizable Laotian communities in the suburban cities of Aurora, Elgin, Joliet, and Rockford.

In the San Francisco Bay Area, the Laotian population is concentrated in the cities of Oakland, Richmond/San Pablo, San Jose, and Santa Rosa/Roseland. Elsewhere in Northern California, there are Laotian communities in Chico, Eureka, Redding, Stockton, and Yuba City. In central and southern California, there are communities in Fresno - also one of the largest Hmong communities outside Laos, Merced, and in Tulare County, California, especially in the city of Porterville. In the 1980s after the communist takeover of Laos, over 10,000 Laotians settled in central California. Many of the Laotians settled in central California to work in the farmland there. Additional Laotian communities exist in the Los Angeles Metropolitan area and in the Inland Empire region (i.e. Banning).

In the Northeast, there are Laotian communities spread across the New England states. With the large concentration in Providence, Rhode Island, Woonsocket, Rhode Island, Lowell, Massachusetts, and Newmarket, New Hampshire.

== Community and social issues ==
=== Poverty ===
According to data collected by the American government in 2013, 18.5% of all Laotian Americans live under the poverty line. A Pew Research Center study published in 2019 found that the poverty rate had dropped to 13% which is equal to the national average. In 2021, 5-year estimates showed it had dropped to 12.1%. In 2022 the poverty rate had dropped to 11.1%. In 2023 the poverty rate had dropped to 8.5%.

Gangs have been an issue in the Laotian community ever since the 1980s and 1990s, although like most Asian communities, gangs have decreased in number and/or have received less media coverage for their activity. Gangs like the Original Laotian Gangsters in West Valley City, Utah, Asian Boyz chapters in California which include a large number of Cambodian Americans, but also have Laotian Americans, and other Asian Bloods and Crips gangs have committed serious crimes starting in the 1980s.

=== Per capita income ===
Despite having a high median annual household income of $85,863, Laotian Americans have a low Per Capita Income of $36,938.

In 2014, identified by factfinder census, when Americans' per capita income was divided by ethnic groups Laotian Americans were revealed to have a per capita income of only $21,479 below the American average of $25,825.

=== Lack of education and school dropout rates ===
According to data collected in 2013, 38% of all Laotian Americans drop out of high school.

== Culture ==
=== Religion ===
66% of the population in Laos adhere to Buddhism and Buddhism is the basis and mainstream religion practiced in Laos. Lao Buddhists belong to Theravada Buddhism and are tolerant towards the pre-Buddhist animist or folk beliefs, which is the belief of spiritual essence possessed in objects and creatures. Buddhists residing in rural parts of Lao also maintained the belief in ancestral spirits, which are the souls and spirits from afterlife. Although Buddhism is the major religion practiced in Laos, there are also Christian minority. There are three Christian churches in Laos: Lao Evangelical Church, the Seventh-day Adventist Church and the Roman Catholic Church.

=== Theravada Buddhist Temple ===
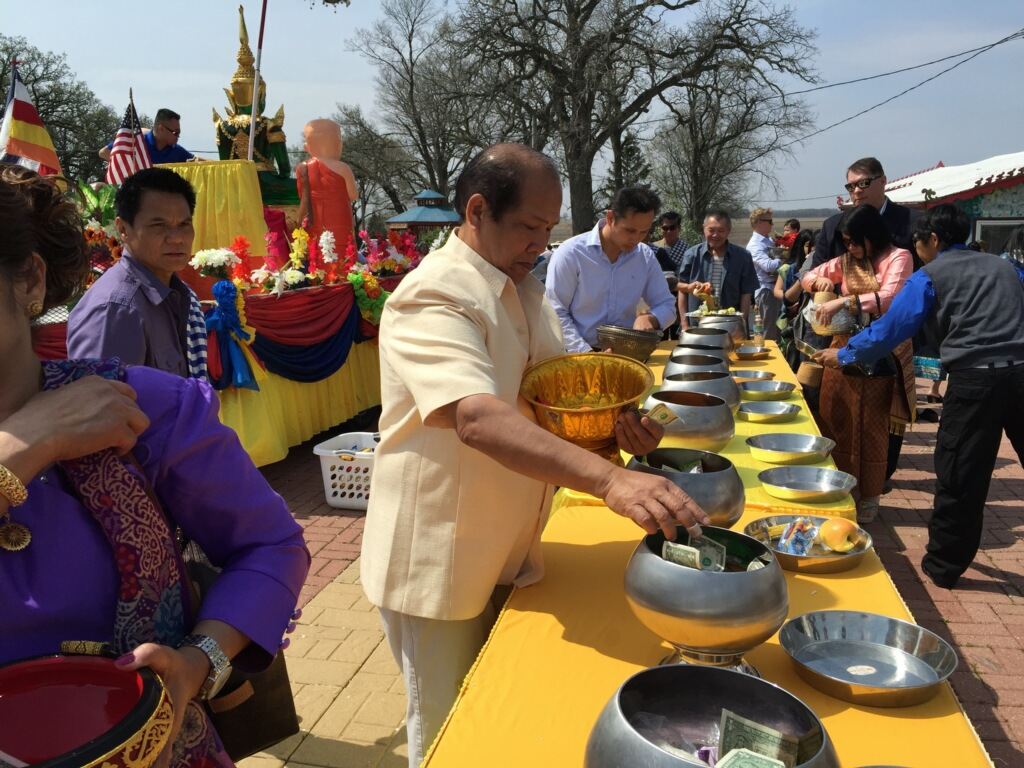
Wat Lao Buddharam, Hampshire, IL

Laotian-American populations have constructed numerous Buddhist temples, called vat or wat. Over time, the congregation donates money to customize and add on to the facility, as well as to add fine artwork and craftsmanship, resulting in a Laotian Buddhist temple that has some traditional features. Examples include Wat Lao Buddhavong located outside Washington, D.C.; Wat Lao Buddharam of San Diego, California; Wat Lao of S. Farmington, Minnesota; Wat Lao Buddhamamakaram of Columbus, Ohio; Wat Lao Mixayaram and Wat Lao Dhammacetiyaram of Seattle, Washington; Wat Lao Buddha Ariyamett Aram Temple in Morris, Connecticut; Wat Lao Lane Xang, founded in 1993 in Willington, Connecticut; Wat Lao Rattanaram in Richmond, California and the Wat Lao Mixayaram in Lowell, Massachusetts. With the growth of Laotian communities in more diverse areas, they have moved to and constructed temples in rural areas, such as Lane Xang Village, located between Lafayette and New Iberia in Louisiana.

== Representation in media ==
One of the first national Laotian-American publication, Lao Roots Magazine, was published in 2007. The English-language magazine is geared toward the younger generation of the Laotian-American community. Published in San Diego by a small volunteer staff, the magazine has reached widespread national circulation within the Laotian-American community. After the publication ceased, former staff member and Yale University graduate Siamphone Louankang created the popular online magazine LaoAmericans.com, which continues to share stories by and about Americans of Laotian descent.

The documentary film The Betrayal (Nerakhoon) was directed by Ellen Kuras and Thavisouk Phrasavath. It portrays the epic of a family forced to emigrate from Laos after the chaos of the secret air war waged by the U.S. during the Vietnam War. Kuras spent 23 years chronicling the family's journey in this film. The film won a Spectrum Award for the Full Frame Documentary Film Festival; it was nominated for an Oscar for best documentary.

King of the Hill, an American animated sitcom, featured ten Laotian-American animated characters in various roles, to include series regulars, recurring, guest roles, or single appearances:

- Kahn Souphanousinphone, voiced by Toby Huss in the original series and by Ronny Chieng in the revival
- Minh Souphanousinphone, voiced by Lauren Tom
- Connie Souphanousinphone, voiced by Lauren Tom
- Tid Pao Souphanousinphone, voiced by Lucy Liu
- Laoma Souphanousinphone, voiced by Amy Hill
- Ted Wassonasong, voiced by Mike Judge in the original series and by Kenneth Choi in the revival
- Cindy Wassonasong, voiced by Lauren Tom
- Chane Wassonasong, voiced by Pamela Adlon in the original series and by Ki Hong Lee in the revival
- General Gum, voiced by James Sie
- Phonsawan Souphanousinphone, voiced by James Sie

The subject of Jamie Wyeth's painting Kalounna in Frogtown is Laotian American.

Krysada Binly Phounsiri (Lancer) & Kennedy Phounsiri (EraNetik), brothers from San Diego, California who share the same passion for breakdancing, were featured on season 6 of America's Got Talent with a dance team called the Body Poets and are now current performers in the Jabbawockeez - "MÜS.I.C" Show in Las Vegas, Nevada. They are also part of the breakdance crew "The Calamities", which they created in 2002.

In the CSI: Crime Scene Investigation season 6 episode “Room Service” both the murder victim and perpetrator are Laotian-American.

== Sports ==
Laotian Americans have excelled in a variety of sports achieving success at the collegiate, national and international level. While many of the individuals discussed in this section may not be notable among the general U.S. population, they are considered pioneers in sport within the Laotian American community and many are believed to be the first to compete at a national level or higher. Many of the second and later generation Laotian American athletes are of mixed heritage.

Khan Malaythong is thought to have become the first Laotian American to represent the U.S. at the Olympic games when he qualified for the U.S. badminton team as a doubles competitor at the 2008 Summer Olympics.

Phoothaphone “Ko” Chandetka is a nationally recognized competitive body builder of Laotian descent who has competed on and off for over twenty years. He is believed to be the first Laotian American to achieve notoriety in the sport. Ko won his first NPC title in 1991 at the age of nineteen and competed at the national level as recently as 2016 when he placed 7th in the Mr. Olympia contest.

Examples of Laotian American football players competing at the NCAA Division I level include Scott Phaydavong (Drake University), Ramaud Chiaokiao-Bowman (Northwestern), Taisun Phommachanh (Clemson), Malachi Moore, Tyler Phommachanh (University of Connecticut), and Nous Keobounnam (Oregon State). Scott Phaydavong may have been the first Laotian America to play football professionally when in 2009 he joined the German Football League's Schwabisch Hall Unicorns. Ramaud Chiaokiao-Bowman signed with the Indianapolis Colts as an undrafted free agent in 2021 although he did not obtain a roster spot. In 2025 Malachi Moore was drafted by the New York Jets in the 4th round while Nate Valcarcel signed with the Los Angeles Rams as an undrafted free agent.

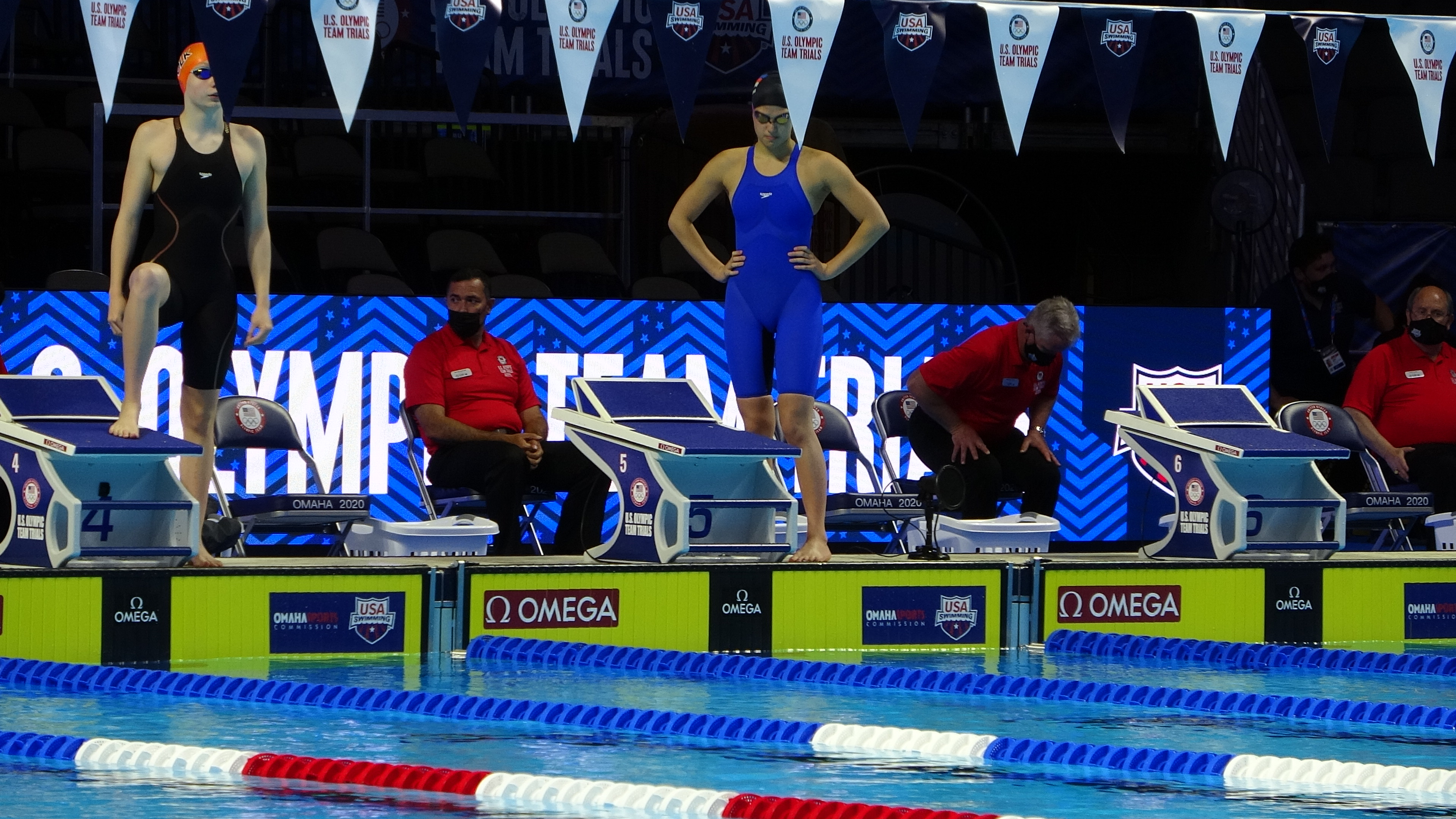
Angelina Messina at the 2020/2021 Olympic Trials in Omaha

Angelina Messina, a competitive swimmer from Illinois who is of mixed Laotian and Italian heritage, competed in the 2020 United States Olympic Trials at the age of sixteen. She is the first known Laotian American swimmer to qualify for the U.S. Olympic Swimming Trials and swims at the University of Pittsburgh.

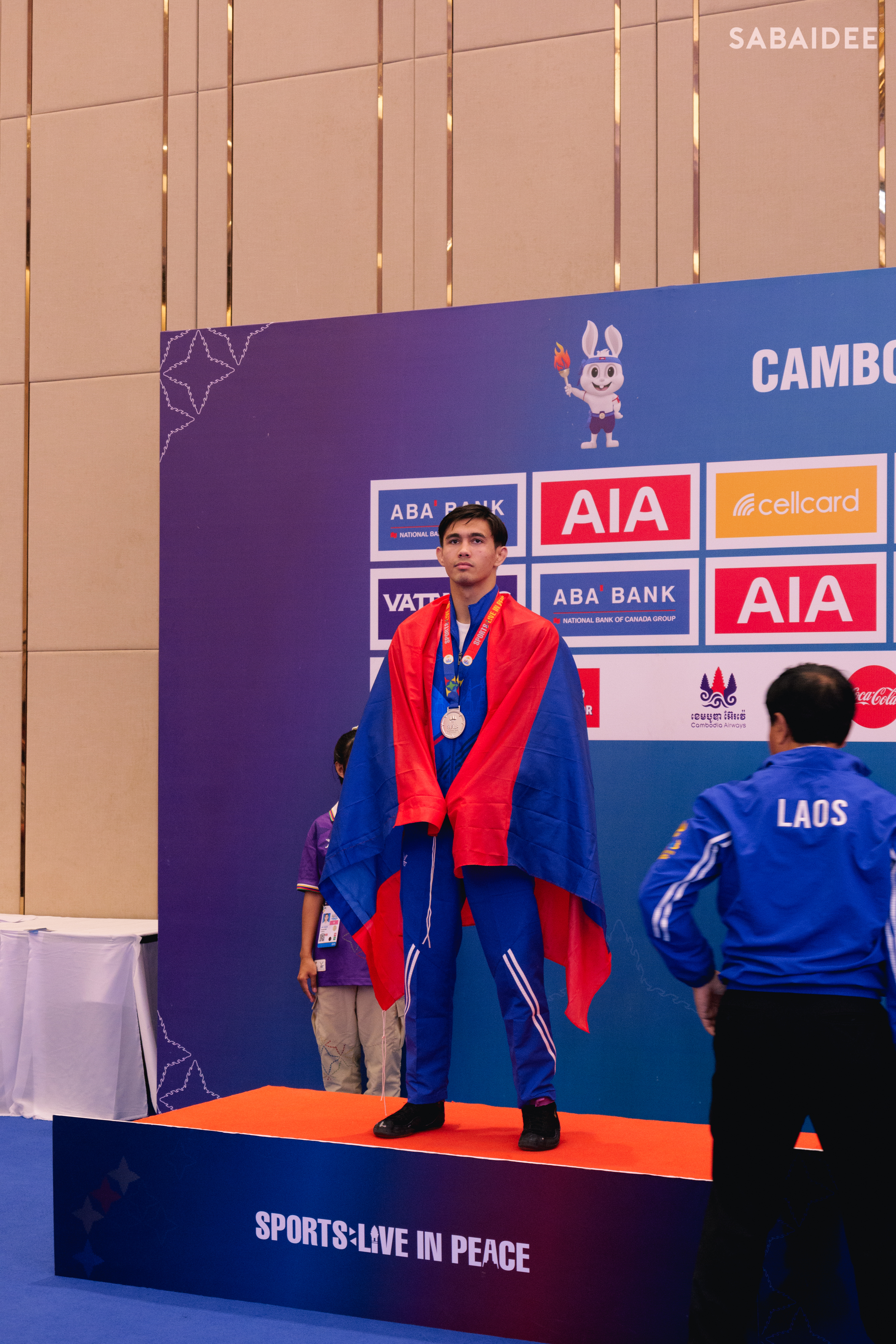
Dawson Sihavong at the 32nd SEA Games in Cambodia

Laos began inviting foreign athletes of exceptional ability with documented Lao heritage to represent Laos in international competition in 2020 with boxer Walter Sarnoi Oupathana being the first American to do so. Several Lao-America athletes represented Laos at the 2023 SEA Games in Cambodia including swimmers Angelina Messina, Ariana Dirkzwager, Astrid Dirkzwager, and Steven Insixiengmay along with wrestler Dawson Sihavong. Sihavong won a bronze medal in Greco-Roman wrestling and silver medal in freestyle wrestling.

== Notable people ==
This is a list of notable Laotian Americans, including both original immigrants who obtained American citizenship and their American descendants.

This list does not include Hmong Americans, who can be found in the List of Hmong Americans.

To be included in this list, the person must have a Wikipedia article showing they are Laotian American or must have references showing they are Laotian American and are notable.

- Samad Bounthong, soccer player
- Ko Chandetka, professional bodybuilder, co-author of the book I am Phoothaphone and subject of the 2019 documentary film Fallen Star Rising Sun.
- Chloe Dao, winner of the second season of the reality show Project Runway
- Mattie Do, is Laos's first and only female film director and the first horror film director from Laos. She directed films Chanthaly (2012), Dearest Sister (2016) and The Long Walk (2019).
- John Douangdara, Petty Officer, 1st Class (PO1), lead dog handler for the elite SEAL Team Six; may be the first Laotian American to die as a SEAL Team Six member
- Ariana Dirkzwager, swimmer
- TC Huo, writer
- Steven Insixiengmay, swimmer
- Jujubee, drag queen and reality television personality
- Xaykham "Xay" Rexford Khamsyvoravong, first Lao (non-Hmong identifying) mayor in America, first Southeast Asian and Asian mayor of Newport, Rhode Island, current mayor of Newport, Rhode Island
- Channapha Khamvongsa, executive director and founder of Legacies of War
- Malichansouk Kouanchao, visual artist
- Tina Maharath, Ohio state senator
- Khan Malaythong, badminton player at the 2008 Summer Olympics
- Malachi Moore, football player
- Justin Phongsavanh, F54 Paralympic Javelin bronze medalist at the 2020 Paralympic Games
- Krysada Panusith Phounsiri, poet, engineer and break-dancer
- Thavisouk Phrasavath, Oscar-nominated, Emmy-winning director
- Chanida Phaengdara Potter, writer, community activist
- Nor Sanavongsay, artist, app developer
- Walter Sarnoi Oupathana, professional boxer
- Konerak Sinthasomphone (Lao: ກອນລັກ ສິນທະສົມພອນ), 14-year-old victim of Jeffrey Dahmer
- Lindsay Souvannarath, attempted murderer
- Andre Soukhamthath, mixed martial artist in the Ultimate Fighting Championship
- Tate Southisene, professional baseball player
- Cy Thao, former Minnesota state representative
- Nate Valcarcel, football player
- Catzie Vilayphonh, spoken word poet of the group Yellow Rage who were featured on the first season of Def Poetry Jam
- Kulap Vilaysack, actress, comedian, and podcaster
- Toy Vixayvong, police officer and city government official in Saint Paul, Minnesota
- Saymoukda Vongsay, writer
- Izaac Wang, Chinese-Laotian-American actor best known for his work on Good Boys (2019), Raya and the Last Dragon (2021), and Gremlins: Secrets of the Mogwai (2023).
- Bryan Thao Worra, writer
- Joe Bee Xiong, former Eau Claire, Wisconsin city councilor

=== In fiction ===
- Souphanousinphone family of animated series King of the Hill

== See also ==
- Thai Americans
- Laos Memorial
- Indochina refugee crisis
- Laos–United States relations
