= Channapha Khamvongsa =

Executive director of Legacies of War, a D.C.-based non-profit organization

- Education: Georgetown University George Mason University
- Occupations: Former founder and executive director of Legacies of War

Channapha Khamvongsa (born 1973) is the Lao-American former founder and executive director of Legacies of War, a D.C.-based non-profit, non-partisan organization dedicated to raising awareness about the history and continued effects of the Vietnam War-era bombings in Laos through the use of art, culture, education, and advocacy. In September 2016, President Barack Obama acknowledged Channapha's advocacy efforts in Laos, when he became the first U.S. president to visit the country.

== Early life ==
Khamvongsa was born in the Laotian capital of Vientiane. However, as a result of the Laotian Civil War, in 1979, six-year-old Khamvongsa and her family were forced to flee due to political and economic uncertainty.

A boat took her family of eight across the Mekong River in pairs, with Khamvongsa and her father waiting until her mother contacted them to confirm that they successfully crossed the border into Thailand. When they did not hear from her mother, Khamvongsa's father decided to have a stranger smuggle Khamvongsa across the border alone. Khamvongsa later found the rest of her family in a refugee camp.

Fearing detection by the Thai border patrol, her father attempted to swim across the river. Despite crossing the river, the Thai border patrol detained him and placed him in a holding cell. By chance, a family friend recognized him as he was crossing the river and sent word to Khamvongsa's family of his situation. The friend also knew a supervisor from the refugee camp and after sending someone with money to pay for his release, the eight of them were reunited.

In 1980, after a year in the refugee camp, Khamvongsa and her family left for Falls Creek, Virginia. As a child, Khamvongsa knew very little about the Secret War in Laos. For her parents' generation, the trauma they had endured led many to ignore or simply forget their past experiences. Through her own research later in life, Khamvongsa was able to discover her homeland's violent past and how this past was affecting the present.

== Education ==
Khamvongsa received her Bachelor's of Science Degree in Public Administration from George Mason University in 1996. In 2002 she received a master's degree in Public Policy from Georgetown University.

== Career ==
=== Prior work experience ===
Before founding Legacies of War, Khamvongsa worked at the Ford Foundation in the Peace and Social Justice Unit, the Center for Public and Nonprofit Leadership at Georgetown University, the Southeast Asia Resource Action Center, the Bill and Melinda Gates Millennium Scholars Program, the National Asian Pacific Center on Aging, and at NEO Philanthropy.

In 2003, while at the Ford Foundation, she came into contact with John Cavanagh, who had worked closely with Fred Branfman and his book Voices from the Plain of Jars. After discussing their shared connection to Laos, he gave her a binder filled with drawings made by survivors of the bombings in Laos. The drawings, along with personal narratives, had been collected by an American educational adviser and his Laotian colleague in Vientiane refugee camps in 1970 and 1971. The images, made with pencils, pens, markers, and crayons, depicted the horrific experiences of the survivors that shaped their reality. It was through this interaction that Khamvongsa was motivated to start an organization dedicated to advocating for the removal of unexploded ordnance (UXO) in Laos.

=== Legacies of War ===
In 2004, Khamvongsa founded Legacies of War, a nonprofit organization fiscally sponsored by NEO Philanthropy, dedicated to bringing attention to UXO awareness, education, and removal in Laos.

In 2010, Khamvongsa spoke in front of the House of Representatives' Subcommittee on Asia, the Pacific, and the Global Environment, within the Committee on Foreign Affairs, addressing the need for increased funding for the removal of UXO in Laos.

In September 2016, Khamvongsa and Legacies of War's efforts were directly acknowledged by President Obama during a visit to Laos, the first such visit by a US president. During a speech at the Lao National Cultural Hall, Obama remarked that "for years, she urged the United States to do more to help remove unexploded bombs here in Laos. 'There are many, many problems in this world that might not be able to be solved in a lifetime,' she's said, but this is one we can fix. So, Channapha, we thank you for working to fix this problem."

Through Legacies of War's efforts, annual U.S. funding for the removal of UXO in Laos has increased dramatically from $2.7 million to a $30 million commitment for 2016 to 2018. Khamvongsa's efforts through Legacies of War was covered by multiple news sources, such as the New York Times, PBS, and CBS.

Legacies of War continues to draw attention to the UXO issue in Laos and ensure that the UXO sector in Laos gets the funding needed to make Laos safe again from millions of leftover bomblets. The goal is to reduce the annual number of casualties of UXO in Laos to zero.

== Honors and awards ==
Recipient of the Georgetown McCourt Distinguished Alumni Award, recognizing a record of outstanding accomplishments within their chosen profession or demonstrated service to the McCourt and GPPI community.

Channapha was the Keynote speaker at 2017 Laotian American Scholarship Foundation, the 2016 Lao-American Writer's Summit, and at the 2016 Laotian American Society.

She was appointed to the Seattle Women's Commission, was selected in 2012 to be the executive director of the ICAP International Career Advancement Program at Aspen Institute, Aspen Colorado, and served on the board of the Refugee Women's Alliance and Conference on Asian Pacific American Leadership (CAPAL)

Recipient of the Friends Without a Border Healing Asia Award (2015)

Channapha Khamvongsa in 2010 testified before Congress to discuss the issue of UXO in Laos and U.S. funding for their removal. Hearing was held before the House Foreign Affairs Committee, Subcommittee on Asia, the Pacific and the Global Environment, chaired by Rep. Faleomavaega (D-American Samoa)

== Published work ==
- Foundation Trustee Fees: Use and Abuse, The Center for Public and Nonprofit Leadership, Georgetown Public Policy Institute, September 2003
- Cluster Bombs in Laos, Critical Asian Studies, Vol 41, N 2, June 2009
- After War, A New Legacy of Peace in Laos, The White House Medium, September 2016
- Hirahara, Naomi. We are Here, Hachette Book Group (2022)
