= Ketmani Kouanchao =

Lao American educator and writer (born 1968)

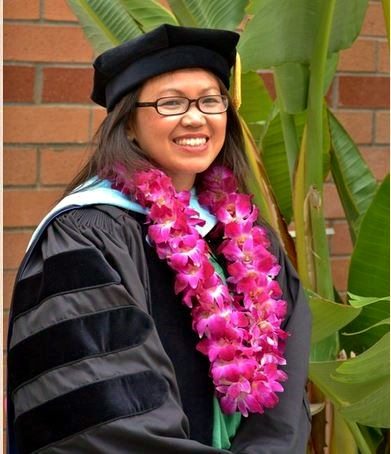
- Ketmani Kouanchao, 2013
- Born: Ketmani Kouanchao; October 5, 1968; Savannakhet, Laos

Ketmani Kouanchao (born October 5, 1968) is a Lao American educator and writer.

== Early life and education ==
Born in Savannakhet, Laos, Ketmani Kouanchao grew up in Minnesota with her parents and 4 siblings, including award-winning Lao American visual artist and entrepreneur Malichansouk Kouanchao. Her mother, Chomsy Kouanchao, had trained in Laos to be an educator, but because of the Laotian Secret War was not able become the teacher she wanted to be. Kouanchao often cites her mother and father as inspirations to her to pursue her education and a life in academia.

Kouanchao attended Edison High School in Minneapolis. She went on to attend the University of Minnesota for her bachelor's and her master's degree, before pursuing her professional interests in Milwaukee and California. She graduated with her bachelor's in Sociology, Public Health and East Asian Studies in 1993. She completed her master's degree in 1997 with a concentration in Family Education. Kouanchao attended California State University-Fullerton where she received her doctorate in community college leadership in 2013.

== Career and community service ==
Ketmani Kouanchao specialized in the study of the recruitment, retention and matriculation of at-risk, low-income historically underserved students. For over 16 years, she has worked at the university and community college levels including the University of Minnesota-Twin Cities, University of Wisconsin-Milwaukee, and was the director of EOPS/CARE programs at Mt. San Jacinto College in San Jacinto, California. She was appointed Dean of Student Services at Mendocino College in July, 2014.

Kouanchao has been actively involved in community service, recently joining the Ukiah Rotary Club and helping the students of the Phi Theta Kappa academic honorary society. She has been an editor for the Journal of Southeast Asian American Education and Advancement.

As an undergraduate in college, she was the secretary of the Lao Student Association at the University of Minnesota.

Other organizations she has been a part of include Kaleidoscope Leadership Institute (2011 – 2011), National Association for the Education and the Advancement of Cambodian, Laotians and Vietnamese American (NAFEA) (2010 – Present), Extended Opportunity Programs Services Association (2008 – Present) SatJaDham Lao Literary Project(1997 – Present), Soroptimist Women International (2008 – Present), Education for Western Association of Education Professional Personnel (2003 – 2008) and the Southeast Asian Professional Network (2000 – 2003) and Legacies of War (2003–present).

She has been a columnist for several publications including the Twin Cities Daily Planet, Asian American press, and Little Laos on the Prairie an online Lao American publication founded by Chanida Phaengdara Potter. She has spoken across the country with students and their families about the importance of pursuing an education and remembering their heritage.

== Awards and recognition ==
In 2012, Ketmani Kouanchao received the Honor an Educator Scholarship from the CSU Fullerton School of Education. She was recognized as Administrator of the Year by Mt. San Jacinto College in 2014.

She has a cameo appearance in the 2013 children's book "A Sticky Mess" by Nor Sanavongsay. A character is named after her in the Steampunk role-playing game "Excelsior" by 2d10 Games, as well as a kickstarter exclusive card for the second edition of "Redshirts" by Weasel Pants Games.

The 3rd Ward of the City of Minneapolis recognized her by proclaiming October 5, 2014 Ketmani Kouanchao Day.
