= French Laotian =

French Laotian or Laotian French may refer to:

- France–Laos relations
- French Laos and people or events pertaining thereto
- French people in Laos
- Laotians in France
- People with dual citizenship of France and Laos
