= Ellen Kuras =

American cinematographer (born 1959)

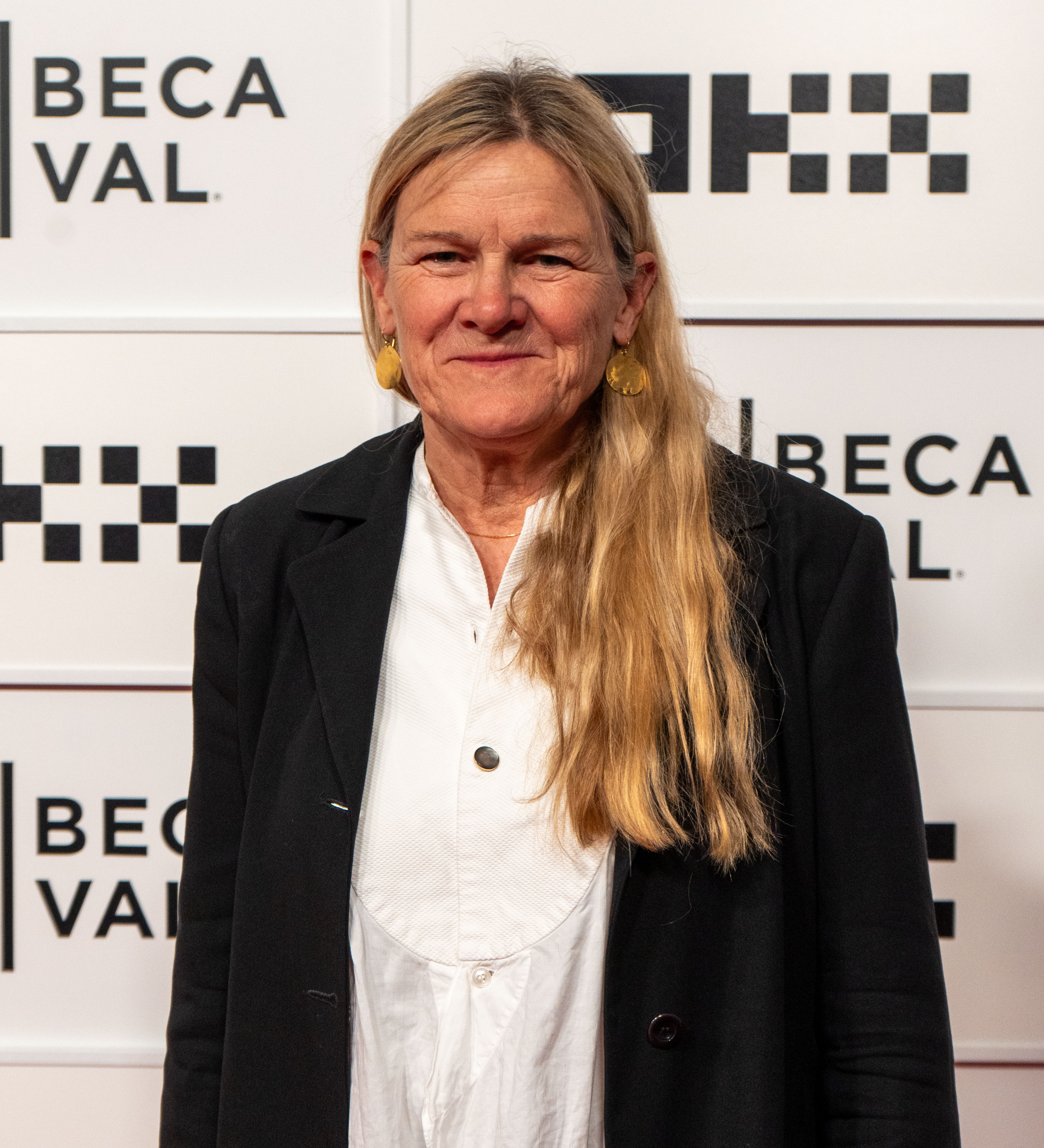
- Kuras in 2026
- Born: July 10, 1959 (age 67); Cedar Grove, New Jersey, U.S.
- Education: Brown University
- Years active: 1988–present
- Organization: American Society of Cinematographers

Ellen Kuras (born July 10, 1959) is an American cinematographer, known for documentary and narrative film, as well as music videos and commercials, both from studio and independent media.

In 2008, she released her directorial debut, The Betrayal (Nerakhoon), which was nominated for an Academy Award for Best Documentary.

== Early life and education ==
Kuras grew up in Cedar Grove, New Jersey. She had a fever as an infant, leaving her almost deaf in one ear and with about 20% hearing in the other.

She attended Cedar Grove High School, where she served as president of the school's chapter of the National Honor Society. After earning a double degree in anthropology and semiotics at Brown University, she studied photography at RISD and 8mm filmmaking in New York, with the plan to become a documentary filmmaker.

In the early 1980s, Kuras planned to study on a Fulbright grant at a film school in Poland but was unable to go due to the introduction of martial law. She is of Polish descent on her father's side and the family surname was originally Kuraś.

== Career ==
Kuras began her film career in 1987, shooting Ellen Bruno's Samsara: Death and Rebirth in Cambodia, the first US movie filmed in Cambodia after the Vietnam War. In 1990 she won the Eastman Kodak Best Cinematography Focus Award for her work on Samsara. The film got notice from the Student Academy Awards and the Sundance Film Festival where it received Special Jury Recognition.

That same year, she was asked by producer Christine Vachon to shoot her first dramatic film (Swoon) for director Tom Kalin. The film won her the Sundance Award for Excellence in Cinematography in 1992. This was the start of work with Killer Films, which includes Postcards From America and I Shot Andy Warhol.

She worked for political documentaries, and, later, other genre of film and TV, such as big-budget movies, independent films, documentary films, concert films, successful TV movies, commercials and music videos for musicians like Bjørk, The White Stripes.

In 1999, she was invited to join the American Society of Cinematographers, the fifth female member to join more than 400 male peers.

She has received accolades, including the Women in Film Kodak Vision Award in 1999 and was honored at the 2006 Gotham Award for her entire body of work. In 2003 she was the first film technician to receive the NY Women In Film and TV Muse Award, traditionally is given to actresses. In 2009 she was a special Honoree at the Santa Fe Film Festival for her work in the field of cinematography.

She has served on the juries of several film festivals. In 1997 she was invited to be on the jury of the Sundance Film Festival. In 2013, she was a member of the jury at the 63rd Berlin International Film Festival. In 2015 she was on the Jury of the Belgrade Film Festival and the Camerimage. She has guest-lectured at film schools and festival panels, including SVA, NYU, BU University of Texas at Austin, Walker Art Center, Hamptons International Film Festival, Camerimage, Berlinale and Woodstock Film Festival.

== Filmography ==
=== Cinematographer ===
==== Fiction works ====
Short film

Year	Title	Director	Notes
1990	Traveling at Night	Chris Kraus	
1992	Nation	Tom Kalin	
1993	Geoffrey Beene 30	Tom Kalin	
1996	The Dadshuttle	Tom Donaghy	Segment of Boys Life 2
1997	My Perfect Journey	Andrew D. Cooke	
2003	Renee	Jim Jarmusch	Segments of Coffee and Cigarettes
2003	No Problem	Jim Jarmusch	Segments of Coffee and Cigarettes
2019	Blasphemy	Melissa London Hilfers	

Feature film

Year	Title	Director
1992	Swoon	Tom Kalin
1993	Romance de Valentía	Sonia Herman Dolz
1994	Post Cards from America	Steve McLean
1994	Roy Cohn/Jack Smith	Jill Godmilow
1995	Angela	Rebecca Miller
1996	I Shot Andy Warhol	Mary Harron
1998	Just the Ticket	Richard Wenk
1999	The Mod Squad	Scott Silver
1999	Summer of Sam	Spike Lee
2000	Bamboozled	Spike Lee
2001	Blow	Ted Demme
2002	Personal Velocity: Three Portraits	Rebecca Miller
2002	Analyze That	Harold Ramis
2004	Eternal Sunshine of the Spotless Mind	Michel Gondry
2005	The Ballad of Jack and Rose	Rebecca Miller
2008	Be Kind Rewind	Michel Gondry
2009	Away We Go	Sam Mendes
2014	A Little Chaos	Alan Rickman

Television

Year	Title	Director	Segment
1996	If These Walls Could Talk	Nancy Savoca	"1952"

==== Documentary works ====
===== Short film =====
Year	Title	Director
1989	Samsara: Death and Rebirth in Cambodia	Ellen Bruno
1992	Guerrillas in Our Midst	Amy Harrison
2003	Asylum	Sandy McLeod
2013	Split	Ellen Bruno

===== Film =====
Year	Title	Director	Notes
1995	Unzipped	Douglas Keeve	With Robert Leacock
1995	The Women Outside: Korean Women and the U.S. Military	Hye Jung Park; J.T. Takagi	With Sandra Chandler, Herman Lew and Emiko Omori
1997	Poverty Outlaw	Peter Kinoy; Pamela Yates	With Carlos Aparicio, Frank Cardon Jr. and Mark Webber
1997	Scratch the Surface	Tara Fitzpatrick	With Phil Abraham, Niels Alpert, Robert Bennett, Sarah Cawley, Trish Govoni and Kyle Kibbe
1997	4 Little Girls	Spike Lee	
2005	Dave Chappelle's Block Party	Michel Gondry	
2008	The Betrayal – Nerakhoon	Herself; Thavisouk Phrasavath	
2010	Public Speaking	Martin Scorsese	
2014	The 50 Year Argument	Martin Scorsese; David Tedeschi	With Lisa Rinzler
2016	Monster in the Mind	Jean Carper	
2017	Jane	Brett Morgen	
2017	Trouble No More	Jennifer Lebeau	
2019	Rolling Thunder Revue: A Bob Dylan Story by Martin Scorsese	Martin Scorsese	With Howard Alk, Paul Goldsmith and David Myers
2022	Personality Crisis: One Night Only	Martin Scorsese; David Tedeschi	
2024	Beatles '64	David Tedeschi	
2026	Aldeas-A New Story	Martin Scorsese; Johnny Shipley; Clare Tavernor	With Salvatore Totino

Concert film

Year	Title	Director
2006	Neil Young: Heart of Gold	Jonathan Demme
2007	Berlin: Live at St. Ann's Warehouse	Julian Schnabel
2020	American Utopia	Spike Lee

===== Television =====
Year	Title	Director	Notes
1995	American Cinema	Alain Klarer	Episode "Film in the Television Age"
2005	American Masters	Martin Scorsese	Segment No Direction Home
2009	POV	Herself; Thavisouk Phrasavath	Segment The Betrayal – Nerakhoon

Miniseries

Year	Title	Director	Notes
1994	A Century of Women	Chris Harty; Barbara Kopple; Judy Korin; Sylvia Morales	
2017	Wormwood	Errol Morris	With Igor Martinovic
2021	Pretend It's a City	Martin Scorsese	
2021	Pride	Tom Kalin	Episode "1950s: People Had Parties"

TV movies

Year	Title	Director
1991	Danger: Kids at Work	Lyn Goldfarb
2001	A Huey P. Newton Story	Spike Lee
2002	Jim Brown: All-American	Spike Lee

=== Director ===
Documentary film

Year	Title	Director	Writer	Producer	Note
2008	The Betrayal – Nerakhoon	Yes	Yes	Yes	Co-directed with Thavisouk Phrasavath

Feature film

- Lee (2023)

TV series

Year	Title	Episode(s)
2016	Falling Water	"The Well"
2016	Falling Water	"No Task for the Timid"
2017	Ozark	"Nest Box"
2017	Ozark	"Kaleidoscope"
2018	Legion	"Chapter 12"
2022	The Son	"The Blue Light"
2022	The Son	"Somebody Get a Shovel"
2019–2020	The Umbrella Academy	"Man on the Moon"
2019–2020	The Umbrella Academy	"Number Five"
2019–2020	The Umbrella Academy	"A Light Supper"
2019–2020	The Umbrella Academy	"Öga for Öga"
2020	Brave New World	"Soma Red"
2022	The Terminal List	"Encoding"
2023	Extrapolations	"2059 Part I: Face of God"

Miniseries

Year	Title	Episode(s)
2019	Catch-22	"Episode 2"
2019	Catch-22	"Episode 3"
2022	Inventing Anna	"Check Out Time"
2022	Inventing Anna	"Dangerously Close"

TV movie

- Play is Your Superpower (2023)

== Awards and nominations ==
Academy Awards

Year	Category	Title	Result
2009	Best Documentary Feature Film	The Betrayal (Nerakhoon) (With Thavisouk Phrasavath)	Nominated

Primetime Emmy Awards

Year	Category	Title	Result
1994	Outstanding Cinematography for a Nonfiction Program	A Century of Women	Nominated
1998	Outstanding Cinematography for a Nonfiction Program	4 Little Girls	Nominated
2009	Exceptional Merit in Documentary Filmmaking	The Betrayal – Nerakhoon	Won
2018	Outstanding Cinematography for a Nonfiction Program	Jane	Won
2021	Outstanding Technical Direction, Camerawork, Video Control for a Special	American Utopia	Nominated

Sundance Film Festival

Year	Category	Title	Result
1992	Cinematography Award: Dramatic	Swoon	Won
1995	Cinematography Award: Dramatic	Angela	Won
2002	Cinematography Award: Dramatic	Personal Velocity: Three Portraits	Won
2008	Grand Jury Prize: Documentary	The Betrayal (Nerakhoon)	Nominated

Independent Spirit Awards

Year	Category	Title	Result
1992	Best Cinematography	Swoon	Nominated
2002	Best Cinematography	Personal Velocity: Three Portraits	Nominated
2008	Best Documentary Feature	The Betrayal (Nerakhoon)	Nominated

Online Film Critics Society

Year	Category	Title	Result
2005	Best Cinematography	Eternal Sunshine of the Spotless Mind	Nominated
