= Laotians in France =

People of Lao ancestry who were born in or immigrated to France

Laotiens en France ຄົນລາວຝຣັ່ງເສດ

Total population
- 200,000 (2019)

Regions with significant populations
- Paris, Marseille, Lille, Strasbourg

Languages
- French (standard and Lao variant), Lao

Religion
- Theravada Buddhism

Related ethnic groups
- Laotian diaspora, Asians in France

Laotians in France (Lao: ຄົນລາວຝຣັ່ງເສດ, French: Diaspora laotienne en France) consist of people of Lao ancestry who were born in or immigrated to France. The population as of 2019 is estimated to be 200,000.

The Laotian community in France forms the most established overseas Laotian population outside of Southeast Asia, with a presence in the country dating to before the end of the Laotian Civil War and mass refugee migration that resulted from it.

== History ==
The presence of Laotian people in France began during the early 20th century, when Laos was a protectorate of France. With the steady introduction of the French education system by the colonists, a number of Laotian students were able to study in France, including members of the Lao Royal Family. A smaller number of Laotian workers also settled in France during this period.

Following Laotian independence in 1953 and the Geneva Accords, a significant number of Lao continued to immigrate to France. This wave of migrants initially consisted of those loyal to the colonial government, followed by students and middle class entrepreneurs who arrived throughout the 1960s and 1970s. Community organizations were established by this group of migrants to better serve Laotian immigrant and expatriate needs, and would form the base of Laotian cultural institutions for later immigrants.

However, the largest influx of Laotians immigrated to France following the Vietnam War and communist takeover of their homeland. France was an ideal destination for Laotian refugees who were educated or formed part of the elite and middle class in the home nation, while poorer refugees tended to emigrate to North America and Australia through the assistance of the American, Canadian and Australian governments. By the beginning of the 1980s, 25,000 Laotian refugees had arrived in France. Lao Buddhist temples and associations established by immigrants who had arrived in France prior to the refugee influx had an effect in helping these arrivals adjust to life in a new country and have served as vital cultural and community centers.

== Culture and demographics ==
Unlike their counterpart communities in the United States, Canada, and Australia, Laotians in France are more successful and better integrated into the host country due to stronger knowledge of the nation's social aspects, such as culture, language, and history. Although the issue of immigrant groups and their level of assimilation has been an important issue in French politics, the Laotian community is highly integrated into French society, with high average rates of educational and economic achievement, especially among the generations of French-born Lao.

The majority of Laotians in France live in Paris and the surrounding Île-de-France region, where many Lao-based businesses and community organizations are located in the Quartier Asiatique neighborhood of the 13th arrondissement of Paris. Smaller communities reside in Marseille, Lille, and Strasbourg. While the generation of immigrants to France tries to preserve Laotian culture and uses the Lao language among the community, the generations born in France are increasingly influenced by French culture, with many members of the generations being unable to understand or speak Lao. Cultural organizations are present to serve both immigrant and French-born Lao, including weekend Lao-language schools for the latter group.

Laotian Buddhist temples serve as community and cultural centers for the Laotian population in France, and important traditional holidays such as Lao New Year and the Pha That Luang Festival are observed in addition to French holidays.

== Politics ==
While the rate of naturalization among Laotian immigrants is high, the community is not actively involved in French politics. Instead, many in the generation of refugees tend to closely monitor politics in Laos. Additionally, the community is largely anti-communist and opposes the one-party rule of the Lao People's Revolutionary Party in the home country since the end of the Laotian Civil War. Earlier Lao immigrants and expatriates to France historically played important roles in shaping the politics of Laos during the early and mid-20th century.

As a result of the community's well-established presence in its host country compared to other Western nations where Laotian refugees and immigrants settled, the Laotian French community has played a key role in serving as a model to assist counterpart diaspora communities with integration through socioeconomic and community organizational links. Laotian community leaders in France also founded l'Organisation Laotienne pour les Réfugiés et la Concorde nationale (OLREC) in 1990 to advocate for the resettlement of remaining Lao refugees still in camps to the United Nations High Commissioner for Refugees.

== Notable individuals ==
- Willy Denzey, singer
- Billy Ketkeophomphone, football player
- Kayane, fighting games player and journalist

== See also ==
- France–Laos relations
- History of Laos
- French Laos, French protectorate of Laos
- French language in Laos
- Asian diasporas in France
