= Saeng Douangdara =

Lao-American chef and content creator

- ແສງ ດວງດາລາ
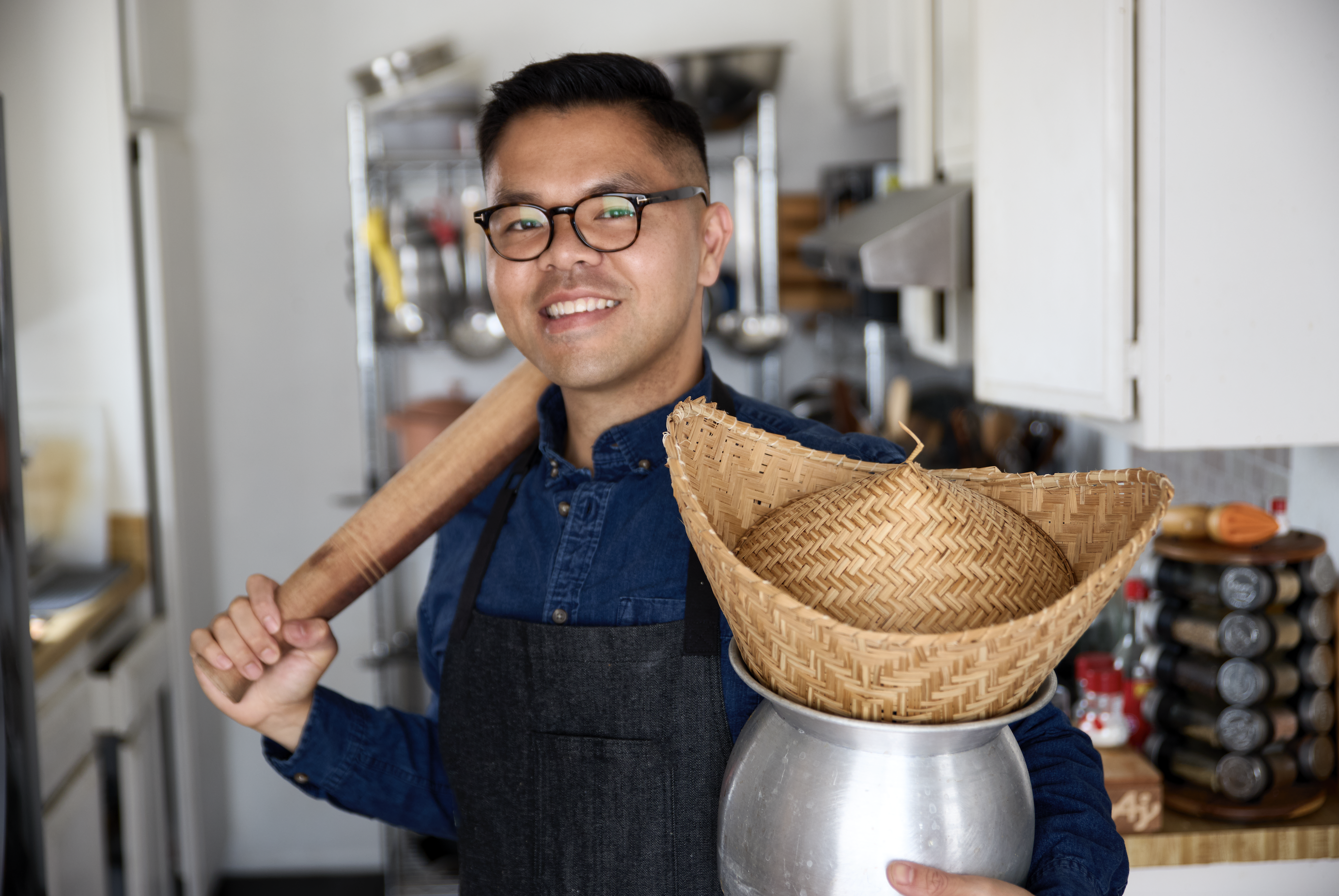
- Born: July 18, 1989 (age 37); Thailand
- Education: University of Wisconsin–Madison (BA); University of Hawaii at Hilo (MA)
- Website: www.saengskitchen.com

Saeng Douangdara (Lao: ແສງ ດວງດາລາ; born July 18, 1989) is an American chef, content creator, and activist. Based in Los Angeles, Saeng is a member of Laos Angeles and Lao Food Foundation. He is an advocate for Laotian cuisine in the United States, which has often been subsumed by Thai cuisine.

== Life and education ==
Saeng Doungdara was born in Thailand, in a refugee camp, after his parents fled from Laos. He was raised in Wisconsin, where he obtained a bachelor's degree in social welfare at the University of Wisconsin–Madison. He then obtained a master's degree at the University of Hawaii at Hilo, where he then worked as a counselor in higher education.

He is currently based in Los Angeles.

== Career ==
In 2026, Douangdara published a cookbook, The Lao Kitchen: Lao Flavors and Stories Told Through Family Recipes.

== Publications ==
- —— (2026-04-21). The Lao Kitchen: Lao Flavors and Stories Told Through Family Recipes. Ten Speed Press. ISBN 9780593836170.
