= Chanida Phaengdara Potter =

- Born: Chanida Phaengdara; May 28, 1984 (age 42); Viengxai, Laos

Chanida Phaengdara Potter (born May 28, 1984) is a Lao American writer, activist and community development strategist in the Lao American and Southeast Asian diaspora communities. She is well known for her work as the founding editor of the internationally acclaimed online publication, Little Laos on the Prairie where voice and visibility of the Lao diaspora experience are amplified. She is the executive director of The SEAD Project (Southeast Asian Diaspora Development), an organization based in Minnesota and Laos aimed at empowering Southeast Asian diaspora communities by bridging the access gap to community, storytelling, languages, heritages and cross-cultural connections and knowledge-sharing through creative workshops and communication tools. She has worked in the nonprofit field on organizing, public affairs, community development, and human rights advocacy.

== Education ==
Chanida Phaengdara Potter holds a BA in Global Studies and Communications from the University of Minnesota-Twin Cities and MPA from Hamline University.

== Writing and advocacy ==
Chanida Phaengdara Potter has been featured on Twin Cities Daily Planet, Asian American Press, The Uptake, Minnesota Public Radio, Star Tribune, Pioneer Press and Voice of America. Her focus areas are in the Lao diaspora, international affairs, and sustainable development through communication platforms.

In 2010, Chanida Phaengdara Potter was a chair of the first National Lao American Writers Summit in Minneapolis with Saymoukda Vongsay, Catzie Vilayphonh, and Bryan Thao Worra. She returned again as a chair of the second National Lao American Writers Summit in 2015, which merged with the National Lao American Symposium with the theme "Our Shared Journey."

In 2011, she co-founded the online publication, Little Laos on the Prairie, with Danny Khotsombath. LLOTP is an online storytelling publication driven by a team of Lao American writers committed to sharing the journeys, cultures, and livelihoods of the Lao Diaspora experience. Through LLOTP's simplified and creative platform, LLOTP aims to make space for our stories to be accessible, increase visibility of our culturally-specific issues, and empower Lao Diaspora communities across the globe to take ownership of their diverse voices. She has been involved in volunteer work on community development and advising for organizations such as Legacies of War, Health Equity Working Committee, PAAVE-MN, AFFIRM Immigration Network, Lao Professionals Network. She is a board member on the award-winning Twin Cities Media Alliance.

In 2015, Chanida Phaengdara Potter organized and curated the "Refuge of the InvisibLao" interdisciplinary exhibit that was presented in Minneapolis and in Brooklyn Park. It was funded in part by crowdfunding efforts as well as a grant awarded by the Metropolitan Regional Arts Council of Minnesota. The exhibit was convened to mark the 40th anniversary of the Laotian Diaspora that began in 1975.

== Personal life ==
Chanida Phaengdara was born in 'samana' labor camp in Viengxai, Laos in 1984 while her family were subjected to post-war labor and reeducation as political prisoners. In 1987, her family sought asylum to the United States, after living in refugee camps for three years. The Phaengdara's resettled in Minneapolis. Chanida currently lives in Minneapolis, Minnesota with her husband and children.
