= Midwestern Gothic =

American literary magazine

- Founded: 2010
- Founder: Robert James Russell and Jeff Pfaller
- Country of origin: United States
- Headquarters location: Ann Arbor, Michigan and Chicago, Illinois
- Publication types: Magazines, Books
- Official website: www.midwestgothic.com

Midwestern Gothic was an American literary magazine based in Ann Arbor, Michigan and Chicago, Illinois. Founded in 2010 by Robert James Russell and Jeff Pfaller, Midwestern Gothic published fiction, essays, poetry, and photography.

In 2013, Midwestern Gothic expanded into a book division, MG Press. From 2014 to 2016, in partnership with the University of Michigan's Residential College, they hosted an annual literary festival called Voices of the Middle West

Midwestern Gothic also ran frequent interviews with influential Midwestern authors and poets, such as Charles Baxter, Matt Bell, Marianne Boruch, Peter Ho Davies, Stuart Dybek, Alice Friman, V.V. Ganeshananthan, Thomas McGuane.

As of December 2021, Midwestern Gothic and MG Press closed permanently.

== Midwestern Gothic (literary journal) ==
Midwestern Gothic
- Categories: Literary magazine
- Frequency: Quarterly
- First issue: 2010
- Country: United States
- Language: English
- Website: midwestgothic.com/issues/
- ISSN: 2159-8827

Midwestern Gothic published fiction, essays, poetry, and photography, and was dedicated to painting a portrait of the Midwestern United States by writers who lived there or who had just passed through.

It was also distinguished from many other literary magazines by actively seeking work from previously unpublished writers in addition to established ones. Published authors included Nick Arvin, Frank Bill, Aaron Burch, Bonnie Jo Campbell, Roxane Gay, Amorek Huey, Lindsay Hunter, Keith Taylor, Anne Valente, Jeff Vande Zande, Marcus Wicker.

=== Staff ===
- Co-founder/Managing Editor: Robert James Russell
- Co-founder/Managing Editor: Jeff Pfaller
- Poetry Editor: Christina Olson
- Digital Marketing Director: Allison Reck
- Assistant Editor: Lauren Crawford
- Assistant Editor: Giuliana Eggleston
- Assistant Editor: Rachel Hurwitz

== MG Press ==
Founded in 2013, MG Press was an extension of the literary journal Midwestern Gothic, focusing on Midwestern authors and their work.

=== Books published ===
- VanBaale, Kali. The Space Between (2018). ISBN 978-1-944850-09-8
- Prushinskaya, Anna. A Woman Is a Woman Until She Is a Mother (2017). ISBN 978-1-944850-06-7
- Lesmeister, Keith. We Could’ve Been Happy Here (2017). ISBN 978-1944850050
- Shonkwiler, Eric. 8th Street Power & Light (2016). ISBN 978-1944850036
- VanBaale, Kali. The Good Divide (2016). ISBN 978-1944850005
- McCarthy, John. Ghost County (2016). ISBN 978-0988201392
- Tell Me How It Was: An Anthology of Imagined Michigan Histories. (2015). ISBN 978-0988201361
- Babcock, Julie. Autoplay (2014). ISBN 978-0988201347
- Shonkwiler, Eric. Above All Men (2014). ISBN 978-0988201323
- Carpenter, Scott Dominic. This Jealous Earth: Stories (2013). ISBN 978-0988201330

== See also ==
- List of literary magazines
