= Whistling Shade =

American magazine

Whistling Shade is a literary journal based in St. Paul, Minnesota. Founded in 2001, the journal features fiction, poetry, memoir and essays on literary topics. Whistling Shade is semi-annual, and the print issue is distributed freely in cafes, book stores, and libraries in the Twin Cities area. Issues often have themes such as ghosts, mystery, song lyrics and bar stories.

According to the journal website, Whistling Shade takes "a populist approach to literature and our audience is the general reading public." It is run by volunteers, has no academic backing and chooses not to apply for grants. Whistling Shade also publishes novels, short story and poetry collections by authors such as Jarda Cervenka, Sharon Chmielarz, Norita Dittberner-Jax and Jeff Vande Zande. It is financed by book sales, subscriptions and advertising. Poet Alan Morrison wrote of Whistling Shade: "it’s the sheer uncynical, approachable and didactic style of the articles which struck me, making for genuinely informative reading, on a variety of literary-related subjects, blissfully free of that consciously ‘ironic’ style of commentary that sadly informs much of UK journals."

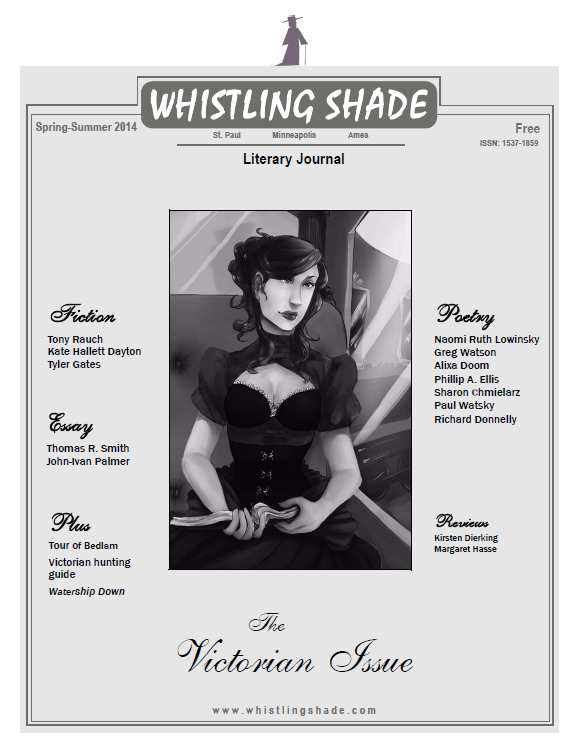
Whistling Shade Spring-Summer 2014 issue cover

== Masthead ==
- Publisher - Joel Van Valin
- Fiction Editors - Rock LaManna, Lizzy Adams
- Poetry Editors - Julian Bernick, Sharon Chmielarz
- Columnist - Justin Teerlinck
- Reviews - Ed Teja, Jordan Hirsch

== Noted past contributors ==
- Fred Amram
- Marilyn Baszczynski
- Eric Stener Carlson
- Jarda Cervenka
- Sharon Chmielarz
- Philip Dacey
- Norita Dittberner-Jax
- Mike Finley
- Daniel Gabriel
- Margaret Hasse
- Mary Logue
- John-Ivan Palmer
- Joyce Sutphen
- Bryan Thao Worra
- Jeff Vande Zande
- Margaret Verble
- Hanakia Zedek
