= Legacies of War =

- Founded: 2004
- Founder: Channapha Khamvongsa
- Type: Non-Governmental Organization
- Location: Washington, DC, United States
- Website: www.legaciesofwar.org

Legacies of War is a fiscally sponsored project of NEO Philanthropy, Inc (NEO), dedicated to raising awareness about the history of the Vietnam War-era bombing in Laos and advocate for the clearance of unexploded bombs, (UXO) and survivor assistance, to provide space for healing the wounds of war, and to create greater hope for a future of peace.

== Organization ==
From 1964 to 1973, the U.S. dropped over 2 million tons of ordnance over Laos in 580,000 bombing missions, the equivalent of one planeload every 8 minutes, 24 hours a day, for 9 years. As a result, Laos became the most heavily bombed country, per capita, in history, with about 30 percent of the cluster munitions failing to detonate, diminishing the chance of development in Laos.

Legacies' primary goals are to:

- Raise awareness in the U.S. and broader international community about Laos and the legacies of the Vietnam War-era bombing.
- Advocate for increased U.S. and international support for the clearance of unexploded ordnance in Laos and greater assistance to victims and survivors.
- Engage communities in the U.S. through discussions of peace and security issues by using the lessons learned from the war in Laos to stimulate dialogue.
- Strengthen the capacity of Laotian-Americans to advocate on issues of concern to their communities.

== Funding ==
Legacies is a fiscally-sponsored project of NEO Philanthropy, a New York-based nonprofit organization that funds a variety of organizations that share a vision of a society that ensures justice, dignity and opportunity for all people.

Legacies receives funding from the contributions of individuals, foundations and corporate supporters. Legacies does not receive any government funding. The government funding which Legacies advocates for goes to on-the-ground organizations such as The HALO Trust, Mines Advisory Group (MAG), Health Leadership International, World Education, and others.

== Leadership ==
Sera Koulabdara serves as the current executive director of Legacies of War. Prior to this role, Koulabdara was a long-time volunteer and served on Legacies’ board in multiple leadership positions, including vice-chair of the board of directors.

A graduate of Ohio State University with a B.A. in international finance and marketing, Koulabdara began her nonprofit career with The United Way of Central Ohio, where she served as senior relationship manager for four years. In this role, she acted as a philanthropic thought partner and trusted advisor to major central Ohio corporations. Koulabdara also has tenure working at national non-profits like the American Heart Association, the Make-A-Wish Foundation, and the Crohn's & Colitis Foundation. Koulabdara first launched her career in Lommel, Belgium, as an international business consultant, completing projects in over 10 countries, including Kuwait, Ghana, and South Africa. While in Botswana, Koulabdara volunteered with the Clinton Foundation.

Koulabdara is joined by a board of directors based across the United States. Serving as chair of the board of directors is Alexandra Hiniker, a lifelong advocate for humanitarian demining projects in Laos.

Additionally, Legacies is assisted by committed volunteers, an honorary committee that features three former U.S. ambassadors to Laos, and a broad international advisory committee which includes artists, writers, poets laureate, professors, and executive directors.

Channapha Khamvongsa is the founder and executive director of Legacies of War. Previously, she worked at the Ford Foundation and Public Interest Projects, focusing on immigrant and refugee rights, global civil society, civic engagement, capacity building and transformational leadership. She was previously appointed to the Seattle Women's Commission and served on the boards of the Refugee Women's Alliance and Conference on Asian Pacific American Leadership (CAPAL).

== History ==
Following the end of the war in 1975, Lao villagers were left on their own to deal with the UXO in their fields and gardens. In 1994, the Mennonite Central Committee initiated a humanitarian demining program with private funding, in collaboration with the Lao government and the Mines Advisory Group. The national Lao demining group, UXO Lao, was formed in 1996. The U.S. and other governments began to support the demining efforts, with U.S. contributions averaging $2.5-$3.0 million a year, far below the estimated amount required to properly address the problem.

In 2004, while working at the Ford Foundation, Khamvongsa was approached by John Cavanagh, the executive director of the Institute for Policy Studies and grantee of the Ford Foundation. Cavanagh informed Khamvongsa of the Secret War and gave her a collection of drawings created by survivors of the bombings in Laos. It was through these drawings that Khamvongsa was inspired to found Legacies of War.

On April 22, 2010, Legacies’ executive director, Channapha Khamvongsa, testified at a House of Representatives hearing entitled “Legacies of War: Unexploded Ordnance in Laos” before the Subcommittee on Asia, the Pacific and the Global Environment (Committee on Foreign Affairs), led by Representative Eni F.H. Faleomavaega (D-AS). The hearing was held exactly 39 years to the day after a Senate hearing, chaired by Senator Edward M. Kennedy, helped to expose the U.S. secret bombing of Laos and shed light on the destruction of the land as well as the displacement of hundreds of thousands of Lao refugees.

During the summer of 2010, Legacies coordinated a letter from the past five U.S. ambassadors to Laos calling on Secretary of State Hillary Clinton to “significantly increase funding for the removal of unexploded ordnance left behind in Laos during the Vietnam War.” The letter was signed by the following former ambassadors: Theresa A. Tull, Charles B. Salmon Jr., Victor L. Tomseth, Wendy J. Chamberlin, and Douglas A. Hartwick, who collectively served in Laos between 1983 and 2004. They endorsed Legacies’ recommendation that the U.S. commit $10 million annually over the next ten years for UXO removal in Laos.

In November 2010, Legacies participated in the First Meeting of States Parties to the Convention on Cluster Munitions, hosted in Vientiane by the Lao government. Signatory countries to the 2008 Convention on Cluster Munitions decided on a plan of action to be used by all states to complete the legal obligations of the treaty, including support for clearance, stockpile destruction and victim assistance.

Legacies’ 2010 advocacy efforts led to a doubling of U.S. funding for cluster bomb clearance in Laos from $2.7 million in 2009 to $5 million, which was, at the time, the largest annual amount the U.S. had ever provided.

The following year, Legacies advocates met with key allies in the House and Senate, including Senator Patrick Leahy (D-VT), to urge for higher funding for UXO removal in Laos from the original request of $5 million. As a result, Congress appropriated $9 million for the clearance of UXO in Laos during fiscal year 2012, tripling the UXO budget for Laos from 2006.

In 2012, Legacies played a significant role in ensuring that Secretary of State Hillary Clinton's visit to Laos, the first visit of a U.S. Secretary of State to Laos in 57 years, would include a strong focus on unexploded ordnance. Legacies proactively reached out to key journalists traveling with Clinton, resulting in unprecedented media coverage of the UXO sector in Laos as well as a successful request of $10 million for fiscal year 2013 from the U.S. Government.

In 2013, Legacies launched its Voices from Laos Speaker tour. The tour, which stopped in twelve different cities, sought to generate dialogue about the impact of the UXO issue in Laos with the goal of raising awareness, inspiration, and funding for the cause. The speakers included Thoummy Silamphan, accident survivor and executive director of a Lao survivor assistance nonprofit; and Manixia Thor, a mother and deputy leader of an all-women's bomb clearance team.

On April 4, 2013, Legacies held a Voices from Laos event at the United Nations (UN) headquarters in New York, NY, followed by a panel in collaboration with the United Nations Development Programme (UNDP) and the Lao PDR. Legacies also secured $12 million for fiscal year 2014, with bill language noting a U.S. commitment to support a multi-year strategy for UXO clearance in Southeast Asia and the Pacific islands, where such ordnance was dropped by the United States.

2014 marked the ten-year anniversary of Legacies of War and the 50th anniversary of the start of US bombing in Laos. The U.S. committed to spending $12 million in fiscal year 2014 for UXO clearance, victim assistance, and risk education in Laos. The amount represented the largest annual spending at that time by the U.S. to support various groups in Laos.

In March 2015 — the fiscal year during which U.S. funding reached $15 million — Legacies and then-executive director Khamvongsa were featured in the International New York Times for Legacies’ work on UXO and the increase of funding for UXO clearance by the U.S. government. In the article, CSIS expert Murray Hiebert cited Legacies of War as the impetus for the funding increase.

In February 2016, Secretary of State John Kerry visited Laos, only the second such visit by a US Secretary of State since John Foster Dulles in 1955. On the trip, Kerry addressed the U.S. obligation to address the UXO issue in Laos. Around the time of his visit, Legacies worked with congressional allies to secure an unprecedented $19.5 million in funding for fiscal year 2016.

During the summer of 2016, in anticipation of U.S. President Barack Obama's September visit to Laos for the ASEAN summit, Legacies ran a campaign to raise awareness surrounding the UXO issue. Obama's visit was the first by a sitting U.S. president to Laos. While speaking in Laos, Obama directly acknowledged Khamvongsa for her work to “fix this problem.” In the same speech, Obama made a pledge to increase annual U.S. funding to $30 million for fiscal years 2016, 2017, and 2018, respectively, for the cleanup of UXO in Laos.

In 2017, Legacies of War successfully helped to pass the second installment of $30 million that Obama had pledged in 2016. This funding is currently being used for ongoing bomb clearance, victim assistance, and risk education, as well as to conduct a countrywide survey of unexploded ordnance in Laos. The installment was passed with bipartisan support, particularly from Wisconsin Congressman Sean Duffy and Minnesota Congresswoman Betty McCollum.

== Programs ==
=== National Traveling Exhibition ===
The National Traveling Exhibition features illustrations drawn in 1971 in Laos by the survivors of the U.S. bombing, archival and contemporary photographs, original recorded interviews and documentary films depicting the lives of those affected by the bombing and their impact on the Laotian diaspora. The full exhibit includes 30 original historic drawings, a narrated video of the drawings, a display of Laotian artifacts, a community healing arts project, a collection of oral histories from bombing survivors, contemporary photos of surviving victims from renowned photographer Phil Borges, and interactive displays that show the dangers of unexploded cluster munitions. In 2007, Legacies premiered the full exhibition in Massachusetts.

=== A Peaceful Legacy: Campaign to Remove Bombs from Laos ===
Legacies has built a platform for its broader advocacy efforts through the A Peaceful Legacy campaign as well as its active membership in the International Campaign to Ban Landmines and the Cluster Munitions Coalition (CMC). A Peaceful Legacy is a petition campaign, launched by Legacies, to educate the American public and encourage their support for increased U.S. assistance to Laos.

=== Panel Discussions, Film Screenings, Performances ===
Legacies supports community screenings of award-winning films, such as Bombies, Bomb Harvest, and The Betrayal (Nerakhoon). The organization also organizes panel discussions and oral histories, bringing together bombing survivors, war veterans and peace activists from the Laotian-American and other communities. Refugee Nation features live performances of theatre, dance and poetry based on oral histories collected from Laotian community members.

=== Our Shared Journey ===
In its effort to create a space for healing for people who have suffered from the trauma of war and refugee, Legacies created Our Shared Journey – an exhibit piece that connects individual stories (refugees, veterans, community members) to the broader human experience and political context of war. Legacies also formulates and sponsors a school curriculum about the war in Southeast Asia through history, writing and art lessons, which has been instituted in many schools in Minnesota.

=== Thip Khao Talk Series ===
To bring together the international Legacies community, Legacies created the Thip Khao Talk, a series of virtual events streamed on Facebook Live that invites leaders in academia, public policy, and the community to speak on topics relating to the process of recognizing the history of the Vietnam War-era, healing from its wounds, and creating hope for the future. The concept of the talk was derived from the U.S. tradition of “brown bag” lunches, an informal seminar where one would bring a bagged lunch and hold a conversation with a guest attendee over lunch. The Laotian version of a “brown bag” is the “Thip Khao” container, used to carry sticky rice and a staple at every meal.

== See also ==
- Laotian Civil War
- Vietnam War
