= Malichansouk Kouanchao =

Malichansouk “Mali” (Lao: ມະລິ) Kouanchao (born 1971) is a Lao American visual artist, web and interactive designer based in Minneapolis, Minnesota. She is the subject of a children’s book Mali Under the Night Sky. Her multidisciplinary works explore the relationship between art, transformation, and communal healing.

== Biography ==
Kouanchao was born in Savannakhet, Laos in 1971 and resettled in Minneapolis, Minnesota in 1979 with her parents and four siblings as refugees from the Laotian Civil War. She attended Minneapolis South High School in Minneapolis in the 1980s. At the University of Minnesota, Kouanchao received a BA in 1998 in Fine Arts, with minors in Chinese and East Asian Studies.

She has received funding and support for her art from the Minnesota State Arts Board and the Jerome Foundation. Her work has been presented in Minnesota, Washington, Massachusetts, Washington, D.C., Arizona and California. Murals and mosaics she has worked on include Hand to Heart,Harmony, People, Places, Connection,Integrity, Sol y Mariposa, and Faces of the Future, Reflect Our Past.

She serves on the national advisory committee for Legacies of War, a multidisciplinary project established to raise awareness of the US Secret War in Laos, and well as to advocate for further U.S. support for the removal of American cluster bombs and increased aid for cluster bomb survivors.

In 2010 she received an Asian Pacific American Leadership Award from the Council on Asian Pacific Minnesotans for her work as a visual artist. She also received an Excellence in Visual Arts Award from the 2010 Lao Artists Festival in Elgin, Illinois.

Kouanchao became the last Lao American to receive an Archibald Bush Artist Fellowship in 2010. Since it began in 1976, 431 artists from Minnesota and the Dakotas received funds from the fellowship program, one of the largest of its kind in the United States. Her fellowship plan includes continued work on her series Displacement: Never Free which examines the lives of Cambodian and Southeast Asian American deportees and the impacts of US policies on their families.

Kouanchao also created the series Living Spirits: Collateral Bodies incorporating traditional Southeast Asian spirit houses and paper lanterns with modern photographic techniques to examine social and political issues.

Her work appears as the cover art for Feminist Waves, Feminist Generations: Life Stories from the Academy, 1964-2000 from the University of Minnesota Press in 2007. Her work is also featured in Wem gehört die Welt? (Who owns the World?) by Mural Global, published in 2002.

Her childhood served as the basis for a 2010 children's book Mali Under the Night Sky, by Youme Landowne, published by Cinco Punto Press.

== Exhibitions ==
- Legacies of War National Premiere of Traveling Exhibition, Intermedia Arts, curator & participating artist, Minnesota, 2010
- Ultimate Landscape, Gallery 13, group show, Minnesota, 2007
- Laos Transpired: Contemporary and Ethnic Works from the Laotian Diaspora, The Brush Art Gallery in collaboration with Legacies of War, Massachusetts, 2007
- Legacies of War National Premiere of Traveling Exhibition, Cambridge Multicultural Art Center and Legacies of War collaboration, Massachusetts, 2007
- International Conference on Laos Studies (ICLS), Gallery 100, ICLS and Legacies of War collaboration, Arizona, 2007
- Refugee Nation/Legacies of War – Searching for Laos in L.A., SPARC, Refugee Nation and Legacies of War collaboration, California, 2007
- Home Sweet Home Again, Basilica of Saint Mary, Minnesota, 2007
- The National Premiere of the Legacies of War Preview, ArtXchange Gallery and Legacies of War collaboration, Washington, 2006
- Legacies of War Project and Fundraising Event, Legacies of War, Washington D.C., 2006
- HOME House Project: The Future of Affordable Housing, Frederick R. Weisman Art Museum, Minnesota, 2006
- B-Girl Be: The Art of T&A (Truth and Activism), Intermedia Arts, Minnesota, 2006
- B-Girl Be: An Exhibit of Multimedia Work by Women in Hip Hop, Intermedia Arts, Minnesota, 2005
- Home Sweet Home Again, Intermedia Arts, Minnesota, 2005
- 5 Senses Show, Babylon Gallery, Minnesota, 2002

== Grants and Fellowships ==
- Bush Artist Fellowship, Bush Foundation, Minnesota, 2010
- Artist Initiative Grants, Minnesota State Arts Board Grant, Minnesota, 2007
- Cultural Community Partnership Grant, Minnesota State Arts Board Grant, Minnesota, 2004/2005
- Fraconia Sculpture Park, FSP/Jerome fellowships, Minnesota, 2004
- Black hole – sound act, Jerome Travel and Study Grant Program, Germany, 2002
- Encuentro IV – InterNos Muralismo, Jerome Travel and Study Grant Program

and Asian American Renaissance Career Development Grant, Cuba, 1999
