= Asian diasporas in France =

Ethnic group in France

Total population
- Estimated to be 4 million (approximately 5.9% of the French population); it is illegal for the state to collect data on ethnicity and race

Regions with significant populations
- Throughout most major urban areas in France (Île-de-France, Marseille, Lyon, Strasbourg, Lille, Nice, Toulouse, Bordeaux, Nantes, etc.)

Languages
- French, Languages of Asia

Religion
- Buddhism, Christianity, Hinduism, Islam, Sikhism, Chinese folk religion, Confucianism, Vietnamese folk religion

Related ethnic groups
- Ethnic groups in Asia

Asian diasporas in France include both foreign residents and French citizens of Asian origin. French citizens of Asian descent primarily have ancestry from the former colony French Indochina (present-day Vietnam, Laos, & Cambodia), as well as from China and Turkey. Other Asian ethnic groups found in France include other West Asians (such as the Lebanese), South Asians, Japanese, and Koreans.

== Asian diasporas by country ==
=== Cambodians ===
The population of ethnic Khmers in France is estimated to be about 80,000 as of 2020, making the community one of the largest in the Cambodian diaspora. The Cambodian population in France has had a presence in the country dating to well before the Vietnam War and subsequent Indochina refugee crisis, unlike counterpart communities in North America and Australia.

Early Cambodian immigration to France began in the latter half of the 19th century, when Cambodia became a French protectorate. The first migrants largely consisted of students and workers belonging to the country's elite class. While most Cambodians arrived as refugees as a result of Indochina's heavy turmoil during the latter half of the 20th century, their large-scale arrival was later than other Indochinese immigrants. Although a few Cambodians were able to flee from the Khmer Rouge takeover in 1975 with French assistance, a much larger influx arrived in the 1980s following the regime collapse and end of the Cambodian genocide.

=== Chinese ===
Chinese form the second largest Asian group in France after the Turks, with a population of roughly 600,000 as of 2017.

The first Chinese migrants to France consisted of merchants engaged in the trading of leather, ceramics, as well as stone carvings, with most of them originating from the region of Wenzhou and the neighbouring Qingtian during the early 1900s. During World War I, a few thousand Chinese laborers were recruited by the French Empire to help with war efforts in Metropolitan France, doing tasks such as working at munitions depots or ports and repairing railways and roads. A small number remained in France after the war ended, settling largely in the Chinese quarter of Paris established earlier by the Wenzhounese merchants, forming the basis of the Chinese community in France. Chinese immigration to France continued as a trickle during the 1930s and 1940s, with some tradesmen and students arriving in the country, primarily to Paris. A much larger inflow of ethnic Chinese arrived in France after the end of the Vietnam War and the heavy persecution of ethnic Chinese in Vietnam and Cambodia by the new communist government in 1975, along with a larger influx of immigrants from the Wenzhou region of China.

The 13th arrondissement of Paris hosts Paris' Quartier Asiatique, the largest and most important community for the city's Asian population. While originally an ethnic Vietnamese quarter, Chinese have become the largest Asian and ethnic group in the neighborhood following the former community's assimilation into French society. The Belleville neighborhood of Paris also hosts an important Chinese community, as does the historical Chinese quarter founded by Wenzhounese merchants in the 3rd arrondissement of Paris.

=== Laotians ===
The number of ethnic Laotians in France was estimated to be 200,000 as of 2022. The Laotian community in France is the most established overseas Laotian community outside Southeast Asia, having had a presence in the country since the late 19th century, when Laos became a French protectorate.

Under French rule, a number of Laotian students and workers arrived in France, with some resettling permanently. A much larger number of Laotians arrived in France following the end of the Laotian Civil War (a front of the greater Vietnam War) and the communist takeover of their homeland. The Laotian community is highly integrated into French society, with high average rates of educational and economic achievement, especially among the generations of French-born Lao.

=== Lebanese ===
About 300,000 people of Lebanese descent live in France. Most have left because of the Lebanese civil war, the wars of Hezbollah against Israel and internal crisis which has led to Lebanon nearing being considered a failed state.

=== Turkish ===
The Turkish community in France forms the largest Asian community in the country, with an estimated population of 1 million as of 2010; the estimated number exceeding that as of 2020. The population is as high as 1.9 million according to some Turkish sources.

=== Vietnamese ===
The Vietnamese form the most established Asian ethnic group in France, with a presence in the country dating back to the start of French colonialism in Vietnam in the late 19th century. As of 2022, the population of the community was estimated to be about 400,000, the second largest overseas Vietnamese population outside Asia.

During the colonial period, there was a significant representation of Vietnamese students in France, as well as professional and blue-collar workers, with a large number settling permanently. Following Vietnam's independence, a number of Vietnamese loyal to the colonial government also emigrated to France. A subsequent wave during the Cold War consisted of students and professionals from South Vietnam. However, the largest influx of Vietnamese people arrived in France as refugees after the Fall of Saigon and end of the Vietnam War in 1975.

The Vietnamese community in France is the most successful among overseas Vietnamese communities, having a high level of both integration and success in academics and income. These achievements have led to French media and politicians regarding the French Vietnamese as a model minority.

== Living conditions ==
14% of Southeast Asian immigrants (defined as those from former Indochina) live in social housing, 3 to 4 times less than those from the Maghreb.

== Bibliography ==
- Hahn, Carine (1999), Le Laos, Karthala, ISBN 9782865378586

== See also ==
- Anti-Asian racism in France
