= Chantale Wong =

American government official

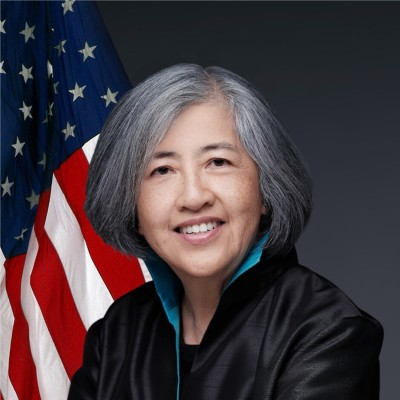
- Official portrait, 2022

U.S. Director of the Asian Development Bank
- In office February 23, 2022 – January 20, 2025
- President: Joe Biden
- Preceded by: Jason Myung-Ik Chung
- Succeeded by: TBC

Personal details
- Born: Chantale Yokmin Wong
- Education: University of Hawaiʻi at Mānoa (BS); University of California, Berkeley (MS); Harvard Kennedy School (MPA)

Chantale Yokmin Wong served as the United States Director of the Asian Development Bank from 2022 to 2025, with the rank of ambassador. Wong is the first out lesbian and the first out LGBTQ person of color to receive the rank of an ambassador.

== Early life ==
Wong was born somewhere in the mid-1950s. As a child, Wong's grandmother "smuggled" her from Shanghai to Hong Kong. She then went to boarding school on the island of Macau. Wong attended middle school in Okinawa, Japan, high school at Academy of Our Lady of Guam in Hagåtña, Guam where she lived with her aunt, uncle, and cousin. In 1980, she received a BS in civil engineering at the University of Hawaiʻi at Mānoa and, in 1982, an MS in environmental engineering at the University of California, Berkeley. She received an MPA from Harvard Kennedy School in 1988.

== Government service ==
She served in a number of positions in the US government. Under Barack Obama, she served as vice president for administration and finance, and CFO, at the Millennium Challenge Corporation from 2011 to 2014. Previously, she was budget director at the National Aeronautics and Space Administration in 2011–12, acting budget director at the U.S. Department of the Treasury, and as the chief of staff to the director of the Office of Management and Budget (OMB). Under Bill Clinton, Wong represented the United States on the board of directors of the Asian Development Bank.

In 1989, Wong co-founded the Conference on Asian Pacific American Leadership.

=== Nomination to the Asian Development Bank ===
On July 2, 2021, Wong was nominated by President Joe Biden to be the next director of the Asian Development Bank. The Senate's Foreign Relations Committee held hearings on her nomination on October 26, 2021. On December 15, 2021, the committee voted to report her nomination favorably to the Senate floor. On February 8, 2022, the entire Senate moved to confirm Wong's nomination in a vote of 66–31. Wong was sworn in by Secretary of the Treasury Janet Yellen on February 23, 2022.
