= TC Huo =

American novelist

TC Huo is a Laotian American author, of Chinese descent, who emigrated from Laos to the United States in 1980 and now lives in Oakland, California. He has written the novels A Thousand Wings and Land of Smiles.

== Awards and recognitions ==
In 2001, he received the Asian/Pacific American Awards for Literature from the Asian Pacific American Librarians Association.

In 2017, Land of Smiles was discussed in Volume 8 of the journal Asian American Literature: Discourse and Pedagogies, in an article titled Reconstructing Diasporic Subjectivity by Brian G. Chen, from Westfield State University.
