= Nor Sanavongsay =

American writer and illustrator (born 1975)

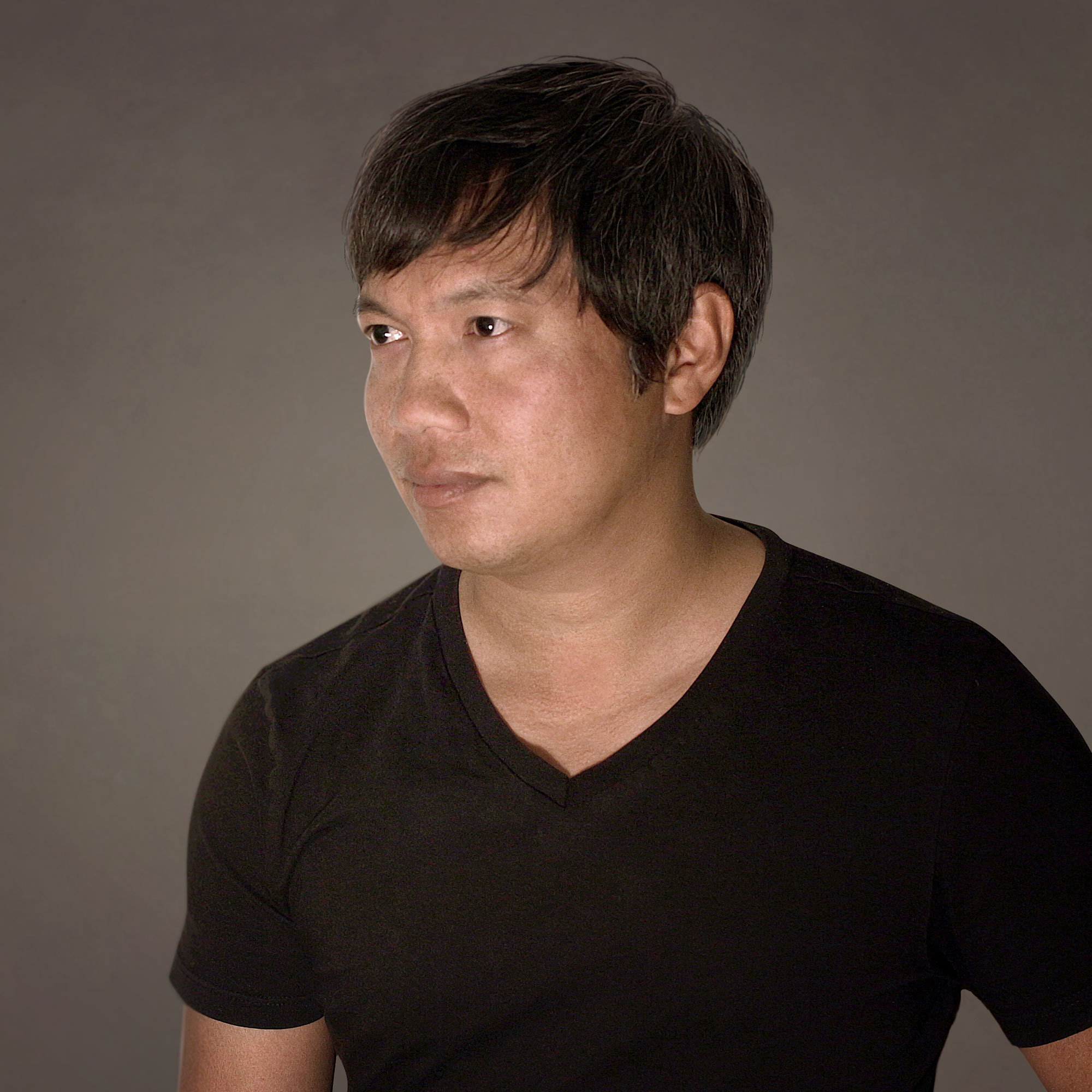
- Sanavongsay in 2017
- Born: Norrarak Sanavongsay; February 28, 1975; Mukdahan, Thailand
- Writing career
- Genres: Short Story, Children's picture books, Comic strips
- Notable works: A Sticky Mess (illus., writer); Mommy Eats Fried Grasshoppers (illus.)
- Website: nor.sanavongsay.com

Nor Sanavongsay (born February 28, 1975) is an American writer and illustrator in the San Francisco Bay area and the founder of Sahtu Press, Inc.

== Early life ==
The Sanavongsay family came to the United States in the aftermath of the Laotian Civil War. Nor Sanavongsay lived with his parents, one brother, and one sister in Kingsport, Tennessee, in 1979. They were sponsored by the First Presbyterian Church of Kingsport, Tennessee. In August 1979, they relocated to Elgin, Illinois, where he would spend the next 30 years.

He grew up watching Transformers, Bruce Lee movies, Thundercats, and other cartoons of the 1980s. He also had a fascination with comic books and graphic novels. He began drawing at the age of six with his uncle as a mentor. He went to Northern Illinois University, majoring in fine arts. He eventually changed his major to web design, graduating in 1998.

== Community service and professional career ==
He has actively been involved as a volunteer with the SatJaDham Lao Literary Project, the National Lao American Writers Summit, the Lao Artists Festival of Elgin, Legacies of War, the Center for Lao Studies, the Lao Heritage Foundation, Laos in the House, and the Kinnaly Dance Troupe, among many others. In 2013, he founded Sahtu Press, Inc., a nonprofit publishing company with the mission to promote Lao literature.

Professionally, he has worked for companies including Encyclopædia Britannica, Sears, Zoosk, Barnes & Noble and currently Workday, Inc.

== Art and writing ==
He is the author of the 2013 children's book A Sticky Mess inspired by classic Lao folktales, particularly that of the folk hero Xieng Mieng. In interviews he noted that it took nearly 14 years to finally get the book to publication and that it had gone through many iterations. He has announced intentions for a three-book series over the next ten years. The first run of the book's publication was funded through Kickstarter.

Nor Sanavongsay is also at work developing the children's book series Kiwi the Green Koala with Dr. Poe Phetthongsy, a graphic novel and a website to help people learn about storytelling.

Recently, he has been sharing examples of his work depicting the classical Lao legends of the Kinnaly, his original characters and concepts, some fan art and most things Lao related on various social media platforms.

== Publications ==
- A Sticky Mess, by Nor Sanavongsay (Sahtu Press, Inc., Nov 2013), ISBN 9780989885003
- Mommy Eats Fried Grasshoppers, Art by Nor Sanavongsay (Sahtu Press, Inc., Nov 2018), ISBN 9780989885034

== Awards ==
- 2014 – Strange Horizons Readers Choice Award in poetry with Bryan Thao Worra.
- 2010 – Lao American Illustrator Award, Lao Professionals of Elgin
- 2008 – iPhone web app Staff Picks (CHORD-C.com web app)
- 1999 – Yahoo! Site of the Week (Encyclopædia Britannica's "Discovering Dinosaurs" Spotlight Site)
