= Bryan Thao Worra =

Laotian American writer

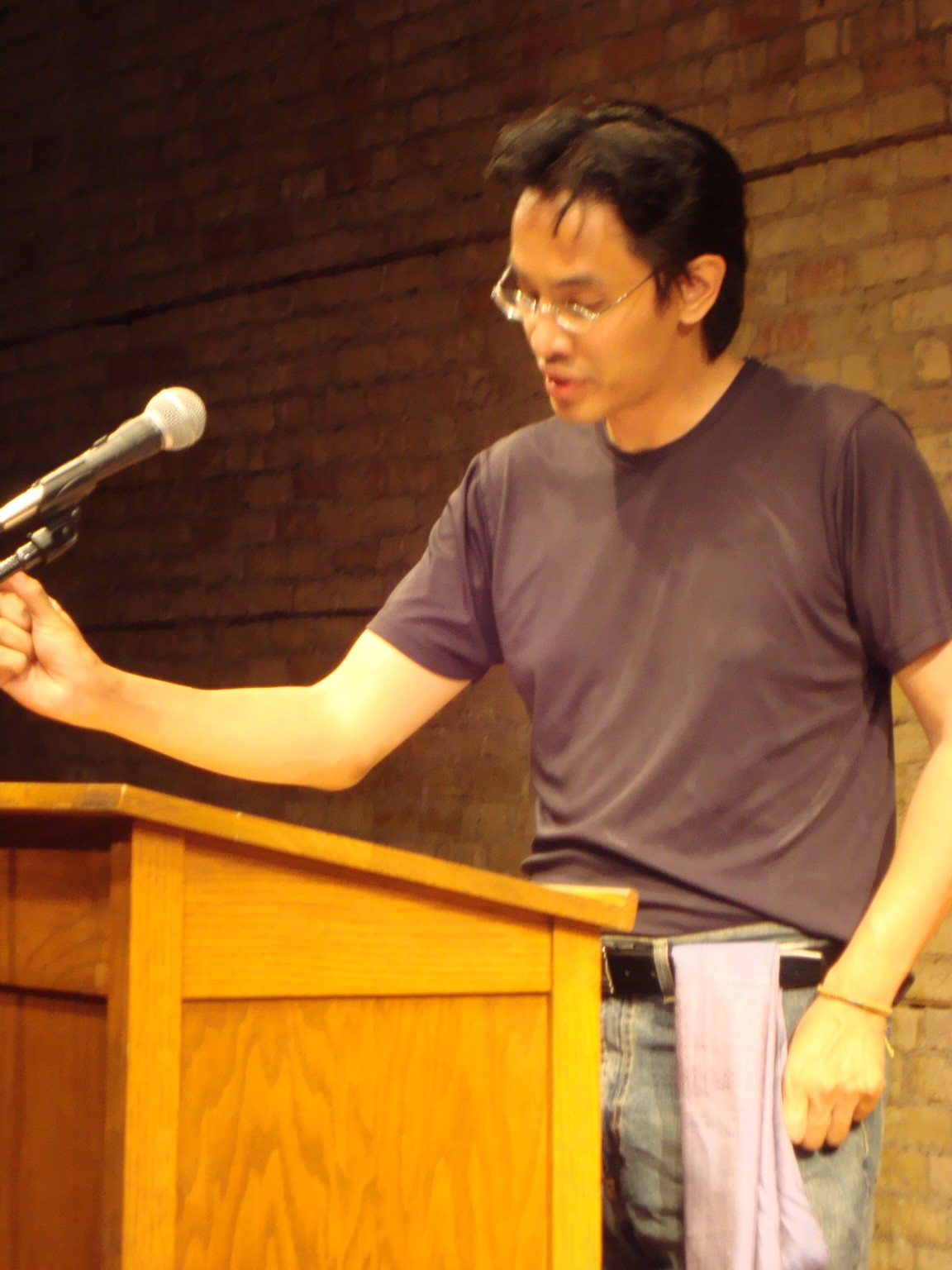
- Bryan Thao Worra 2008
- Born: Thao Somnouk Silosoth; January 1, 1973 (age 53); Vientiane, Laos
- Writing career
- Genres: Poetry, Short Story, Playwright

Bryan Thao Worra (born January 1, 1973) is a Laotian American writer and poet.

Thao Worra is the first Laotian American to receive a Fellowship in Literature from the United States government's National Endowment for the Arts. He was selected to represent Laos during the 2012 Cultural Olympiad.

== Early years ==
Bryan Thao Worra was born Thao Somnouk Silosoth (Lao: ທ້າວ ສອມນກຸກ ສກິລອສອທ) in Vientiane, capital of the Kingdom of Laos, on January 1, 1973, during the Laotian Civil War (1954–1975). Thao Worra was adopted when he was three days old by an American pilot named John Worra, who flew for Royal Air Lao. He came to the United States in July 1973. Thao Worra's early years were spent in Missoula, Montana, Anchorage, Alaska, and Saline, Michigan.

Thao Worra attended several private Lutheran elementary schools in Alaska and Michigan. In the 1980s, Thao Worra attended the Rudolf Steiner School of Ann Arbor, where he received a Waldorf education. He attended Saline High School in Saline, Michigan and graduated in 1991. Thao Worra attended Otterbein College in Westerville, Ohio from 1991 to 1997, studying communications and philosophy/religion with a focus on non-Western cultures.

In 2003, after visiting Laos for a literature program, Thao Worra reunited with his birth mother in Modesto, California.

== Writing ==
Thao Worra has written creatively from an early age, but began seriously writing in 1991. Some of his earliest writing first appeared in the Otterbein College literary magazine Quiz and Quill and the campus newspaper, the Tan and Cardinal.

A widely published Laotian writer, Thao Worra's work appears in over 90 publications including the Bamboo Among the Oaks anthology, the journalsWhistling Shade, Urban Pioneer, Unarmed, the Asian Pacific Journal and the Journal of the Asian American Renaissance and the anthology Outsiders Within. In 2011 he was approved as an active member of the Horror Writers Association. He holds active membership in the Science Fiction Poetry Association.

Thao Worra's writing explores many themes including transience, identity and home. His style is frequently experimental and draws from a variety of modern and contemporary influences, including science fiction and horror.

Thao Worra's chapbook The Tuk-Tuk Diaries: My Dinner With Clusterbombs was printed by Unarmed Press in 2003 in a limited edition. Sphinx House Press released Touching Detonations in the same year, exploring the issue of unexploded ordnance in Laos. These were the first works to emerge from his first return to Laos.

Thao Worra's first full-length book of speculative poetry, On The Other Side Of The Eye was released in August 2007 from Sam's Dot Publishing, based in Iowa. Sam's Dot Publishing specializes in speculative literature.

Thao Worra's follow-up book of speculative poetry, BARROW was released by Sam's Dot Publishing in 2009. Winter Ink was released in December 2008 from the Minnesota Center for Book Arts. In the summer of 2009, he released an additional book of poetry, Tanon Sai Jai based on the Lao American journey.

He published Demonstra, a speculative poetry collection inspired by science fiction in 2013 through Innsmouth Free Press.

Thao Worra was a 2002 Minnesota Playwrights' Center Many Voices Fellow. His play Black Box was performed at the Sex/No Sex Festival, Ensemble Studio Theater, New York, NY in November 2006. He also assisted in the editing of the modernized theater adaptation of Phadaeng and Nang Ai, a traditional Lao/Isan Love Story by Suthasinee Srisawat in May 2007 for Bakka Magazine.

Thao Worra was an active member of the SatJaDham Lao Literary Project, working to promote the work of Laotian and Hmong artists and writers. Thao Worra organized several public readings and exhibitions of Laotian and Asian American artists in Minnesota, including Emerging Voices (2002), The Five Senses Show (2002), Lao'd and Clear (2004), and Giant Lizard Theater (2005). He has assisted and performed with professional storytelling groups in Minnesota. He was a key figure in convening the National Lao American Writers Summit in Minneapolis, Minnesota in August 2010. He also organized the Legacies of War: Refugee Nation exhibit and multidisciplinary arts festival in October 2010 at Intermedia Arts in Minneapolis. In 2024 he curated the Laomerica 50: Democracy and Diaspora exhibit at the Minneapolis Central Library.

Thao Worra often writes as a freelance reporter for several Asian American newspapers including Asian American Press, interviewing numerous Asian American artists and covering community events. He is a regular contributor to the Twin Cities Daily Planet. He has written op-ed columns for the Pioneer Press and community newspapers, primarily on Asian American subjects. He was also a frequent writer for Little Laos on the Prairie, a Minnesota-based Lao American online publication founded by Chanida Phaengdara Potter, and Twin Cities Geek.

== Career and community service ==
Thao Worra typically works with community service agencies such as Hmong National Development, the National Youth Leadership Council, Asian Media Access, and Little Brothers – Friends of the Elderly, the Lao Assistance Center and the Hawthorne Neighborhood Council. In the 2000s, he volunteered extensively with the Hmong American Institute for Learning and briefly served as its interim executive director in 2005.

Thao Worra has been a consultant to the Minnesota State Arts Board, the Minnesota Historical Society, the Minnesota Humanities Commission, and Legacies of War, a non-profit organization that addresses issues of unexploded ordnance in Laos. He has presented for the Smithsonian Asian Pacific American Center, including their CTRL+ALT Culture Lab on Imagined Futures in November 2016 in New York and the 2019 Asian American Literature Festival in Washington D.C. He was the keynote speaker of the 2018 League of Minnesota Poets Fall Conference addressing the theme of "Time and Timelessness". In 2022 he presented at the Singapore Writers Festival on graphopoetics. He was the inaugural speaker at the 2023 SEALIT Circle Writers Festival.

Thao Worra was an early volunteer of AsianAmericanPoetry.com as a member of their advisory board. He served briefly as a volunteer editor of Bakka Magazine, a Lao literary journal. He has served as the creative works editor of the Journal of Southeast Asian American Education and Advancement since 2008. In 2014 he joined Sahtu Press, a non-profit Lao American literary publisher in the San Francisco Bay Area.

Thao Worra is a member of the Asian/Pacific American Librarians Association. In 2009, he was elected to the board of directors of the Loft Literary Center to serve a three-year term.

Thao Worra became the treasurer of the Science Fiction Poetry Association in 2013, and was elected president of the organization in 2016. He served in that role until 2022.

In 2018 he was appointed to the board of the Council on Asian Pacific Minnesotans, and reappointed in 2022 to represent Minnesotans with Lao heritage. In 2024 he was elected to serve as the chair of the board.

== Awards and recognition ==
Thao Worra holds over 20 awards for his literary work and community service, including his arts leadership.

In 2009, Thao Worra became the first Laotian American writer to receive a fellowship in literature from the National Endowment for the Arts. He was recognized in 2009 by the State Council on Asian Pacific Minnesotans with the Asian Pacific Leadership Award for Excellence in the Arts.

In 2010, he was recognized by the Lao Professionals of Elgin, Illinois with their Literacy Award at the 2010 Lao Artists Festival.

In 2014, his poetry collection Demonstra received the Science Fiction Poetry Association's Elgin Award for Book of the Year.

In 2017, he was the first Artist-In-Residence for the University of California Merced's Center for the Humanities. In 2018 the Lao Assistance Center of Minnesota designated him the inaugural Lao Minnesotan Poet Laureate. Thao Worra was named a Joyce Award winner in 2019 and was awarded $50,000 in conjunction with the Lao Assistance Center to produce Laomagination: 45, an exhibition presenting multi-generational stories of the Lao community. In 2024 he was inducted into the Saline Area Schools Hall of Fame.

- 1991 Otterbein College Ammons-Thomas Award.
- 2002 Minnesota Playwrights Center Many Voices Artist-In-Residence.
- 2005 Minnesota State Arts Board Cultural Collaboration Award with Mali Kouanchao.
- 2007 Career Initiative Grant, Loft Literary Center.
- 2008 Artists Initiative Grant, Minnesota State Arts Board.
- 2009 Certificate of Honor, City and County of San Francisco
- 2009 National Endowment for the Arts, Fellowship in Literature for Poetry.
- 2009 Asian Pacific Leadership Award, State Council on Asian Pacific Minnesotans.
- 2010 Literacy Award, Lao Professionals of Illinois.
- 2011 Youth Media Innovation Award, University of Minnesota Human Rights Center
- 2011 Artist Initiative Grant, Minnesota State Arts Board.
- 2012: Represented Laos in the London 2012 Cultural Olympiad
- 2014 Elgin Award for Book of the Year, Science Fiction Poetry Association
- 2014 Bronze Medal, Poetry World Cup, Missing Slate Magazine
- 2014 Reader's Choice Award-Poetry, Strange Horizons
- 2015 Convergence Guest of Honor
- 2017 University of California, Merced Center for the Humanities Artist-In-Residence
- 2018 Lao Minnesotan Poet Laureate, Lao Assistance Center
- 2019 Convergence Guest of Honor
- 2019 Joyce Award winner
- 2022 NecronomiCon: Providence Poet Laureate
- 2024 Saline Area Schools Hall of Fame
- 2025 Otterbein University Honorary Alumni

== Selected works ==
- My Dinner With Cluster Bombs (The Tuk-Tuk Diaries), Unarmed Press Chapbook, 2003.
- Touching Detonations, Sphinx House Press e-chapbook, 2003.
- On The Other Side Of The Eye, Sam's Dot Publishing, 2007.
- Winter Ink, Minnesota Center For Book Arts, 2008.
- Tanon Sai Jai, Silosoth Publishing, 2009
- BARROW, Sam's Dot Publishing, 2009.
- Demonstra, Innsmouth Free Press, 2013.
- Diasporantics, Laomagination, 2018
- Before We Remember, We Dream. Sahtu Press, 2020.
