= Jeff Vande Zande =

American writer and poet

Jeff Vande Zande is an American writer who is best known for his novel called American Poet which won him the Stuart and Vernice Gross Literature Award. He is also a poet and an editor of the Driftwood Review with two of his poems being nominated twice for the Pushcart Prize in 1999. His poems and stories have appeared in such magazines as College English, Passages North and Whistling Shade. He currently teaches fiction writing and film at Delta College in Michigan.

== Bibliography ==
- Emergency Stopping & Other Stories
- Into the Desperate Country
- Landscape with Fragmented Figures
- Threatened Species - A Novella and Five Stories
- American Poet
- Detroit Muscle
- The Neighborhood Division - Stories
- Rules of Order
