= Samsara: Death and Rebirth in Cambodia =

- Directed by: Ellen Bruno
- Produced by: Ellen Bruno
- Production company: Transit Media
- Release date: 1989
- Running time: 28 minutes

Samsara: Death and Rebirth in Cambodia is a 1989 short documentary film about the people of Cambodia rebuilding after being ruled by Pol Pot and being sent to the Killing Fields. The film was directed and produced by Ellen Bruno for her Stanford University master's thesis.

In 2012, the film was selected for preservation in the United States National Film Registry by the Library of Congress as being "culturally, historically or aesthetically significant".

== Synopsis ==
Samsara documents how the Cambodian people have suffered and recovered since Pol Pot and the Khmer Rouge took over the country and since the subsequent invasion by Vietnam. The film uses "prophecies, Buddhist teachings, folklore, and dreams to describe Cambodians' worldviews". As part of documenting the Cambodians' suffering, the film covers several women's experiences.

== Filmmaker background ==
Before Samsara, Ellen Bruno worked in international relief in places like Mexico and on the border of Cambodia and Thailand. Her jobs include working as a field coordinator for the International Rescue Committee and as a director of the Cambodian Women's Project for the American Friends Service Committee. She became interested in filming documentaries due to "her frustrations with direct service work". Samsara was her first film, followed by Satya: A Prayer for the Enemy (1993) and Sacrifice (1998). Bruno formed the production company Bruno Films, which was run with a small staff that changes with each film.

== Reception ==
Samsara premiered at a meeting of the World Forum of Silicon Valley on December 12, 1989. In June 1990, Bruno received one of two merit awards from Academy of Motion Pictures Arts and Sciences for documentary achievement in the Academy's 17th annual student film competition. In the following August, Samsara won first place in the documentary category at the American Film Institute's 1990 Focus Awards for student films. The documentary was screened at the 1990 Sundance Film Festival and won a Special Jury Recognition award.

American Anthropologist described the documentary, "While a solid film, Samsara is often distanced from its subject, providing little sense of connection between camera and people or place, as if images are mainly symbols to carry and illustrate the narration." The journal commended the film's production value and camerawork but thought that the film's context was limited by the filmmaker's approach and a lack of study of "closer, more sustained records".

The Journal of Asian Studies said Samsara was a "beautiful film [that] conveys a deep sense of sadness" in how it follows Cambodians who try to survive and rebuild their lives. It said the film with its "patient pace" presents individual stories to show how Cambodians are "living with these lasting scars". The journal concluded that the film's theme was one of possible renewal through the cycle of life: "The power of the past to haunt is certain, but the film asserts the possibility of compassion and renewal."

In 2012, the National Film Registry selected Samsara: Death and Rebirth in Cambodia for preservation as part of an annual set of 25 films.
