= Thavisouk Phrasavath =

Thavisouk Phrasavath is a New York-based Laotian-American film director/editor, writer and visual artist.

== Biography ==
Thavisouk (Thavi) Phrasavath is a 2008 Academy Award and Film Independent Spirit Award Nominated Filmmaker. As well as being one of the creators, writer, director, a narrator and a subject of the 2010 Creative Arts Primetime Emmy award winner for Exceptional Merit in Nonfiction Filmmaking - The Betrayal (Nerakhoon).

His background in community work includes assisting Gang Prevention for Youth and Family Crisis Intervention through the Church Avenue Merchants Block Association. He also worked with the police as a liaison and consultant for the Lao community. Phrasavath has also consulted for the New York City Board of Education.

== Filmography ==
His projects as editor Summer School, Cuba Libre, Americanos, Streaming with the Prez, Vietnam on the Cusp, Sound Painting, "Golden Venture", and most recently, Water Buffalo Don't Cry.

Thavisouk Phrasavath is also the first Laotian American writer to be a member of Writers Guild of America, West (WGAW) in 2008. He is also a creative consultant for film, television and other media, directing documentaries, dramatic shorts and music video for independent record label and artists. As a writer he has published poetry and won awards for paintings and illustrations.
