= Fred Branfman =

American anti-war activist and author

- Born: March 12, 1942; New York City, New York, United States
- Died: September 24, 2014 (aged 72); Budapest, Hungary
- Occupation: writer
- Known for: Project Air War, documenting bombing of Laos

Frederick Robert Branfman (March 18, 1942 – September 24, 2014) was an American anti-war activist and author of a number of books about the Vietnam War and the Laotian Civil War who exposed the covert bombing of Laos by the US. Working as the Director of Project Air War in 1969 he wrote about the U.S. bombing in Indochina, which he claimed was directed at civilians.

== Life ==
Branfman was born in New York City in 1942. He received a bachelor's degree in political science from the University of Chicago and his master's degree in education from Harvard University. Branfman worked as a policy advisor for former California governor Jerry Brown, Gary Hart and Tom Hayden.

In September 1969, Branfman was working as an educational advisor for the U.S. government in Laos when thousands of refugees fled into the Laotian capital of Vientiane. Working as a translator for international media, he began to interpret countless villagers' stories of planes dropping bombs. When U.S. officials in Laos claimed Americans had nothing to do with the bombs, Branfman became consumed with the desire to understand what was happening. Gathering details, he journeyed to Washington and spoke at a special session of the U.S. Senate Committee on Refugees, exposing the U.S. government's covert activities.

In his last years, Branfman worked as a writer, living in Santa Barbara and Budapest. His articles have appeared in The New York Times, The Washington Post, Harper's Magazine, Playboy, Salon and The New Republic. He contributed to the Glendon Association. He also contributed to the traveling exhibition Legacies of War, that was created to raise awareness about the history of the Vietnam War-era bombing in Laos. In the acclaimed 2007 TV documentary, now released on DVD, Most Secret Place On Earth: CIA's Covert War In Laos Branfman is one of those who speak to camera.

He died in Budapest, Hungary, of amyotrophic lateral sclerosis (ALS) in 2014 at the age of 72.

== Books ==
- The Third Indochina War, Bertrand Russell Peace Foundation, ISBN 0-85124-048-8, ISBN 978-0-85124-048-0
- The Old Man: A Biographical Account of a Lao Villager.
- Voices from The Plain of Jars, Life Under an Air War, Harper & Row 1972. Reprinted by the University of Wisconsin Press with a new introduction in 2010.
- Life under the bombs, Project Air War, Harper & Row, 1972, ISBN 0-06-090300-7, ISBN 978-0-06-090300-8
- The Village of the Deep Pond, Ban Xa Phang Meuk, Laos, International Area Studies Programs, University of Massachusetts Amherst, 1978, ASIN: B0000E92G5
