= France–Laos relations =

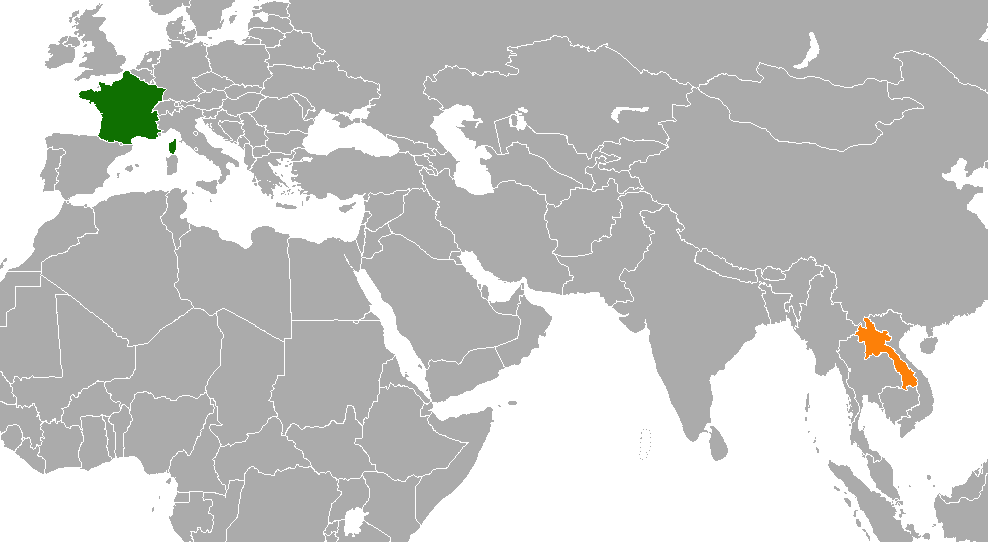
- France: Laos

France–Laos relations are the bilateral relations between France and Laos. France has an embassy in Vientiane, and Laos has an embassy in Paris. Both countries are members of Organisation internationale de la Francophonie.

== History ==
The French arrived in Laos in 19th century when France was engaged in conquering Vietnam, and Laos was totally devastated by the earlier Anouvong rebellion against Siam. In order to repopulate the territory and to expand French political and economic domination, the French annexed Laos in 1887. France turned Laos into a protectorate in 1893, and rebuilt what is now the capital city of Laos, Vientiane.

Under French rule, Laos was largely left untouched and thus Laotian resistance against France was much weaker than in neighboring Vietnam. It changed when Japan invaded Indochina and anti-French, anti-Japanese movements started to blossom; nonetheless, throughout and after World War II, anti-French resistance didn't strengthen due to differences in ideologies and factional conflicts. By the time the Pathet Lao, led by Prince Souphanouvong and Kaysone Phomvihan emerged, the French had begun the process of retreating from Indochina, and after 1954, link between two countries was insignificant until Laotian economic reforms in 1990s.

== Modern relations ==
After Laotian reforms in 1990s, the relationship between Laos and France began to re-emerge after decades of negligence. Laos joined the Organisation internationale de la Francophonie in 1991, and has two branches of the Institut de France.

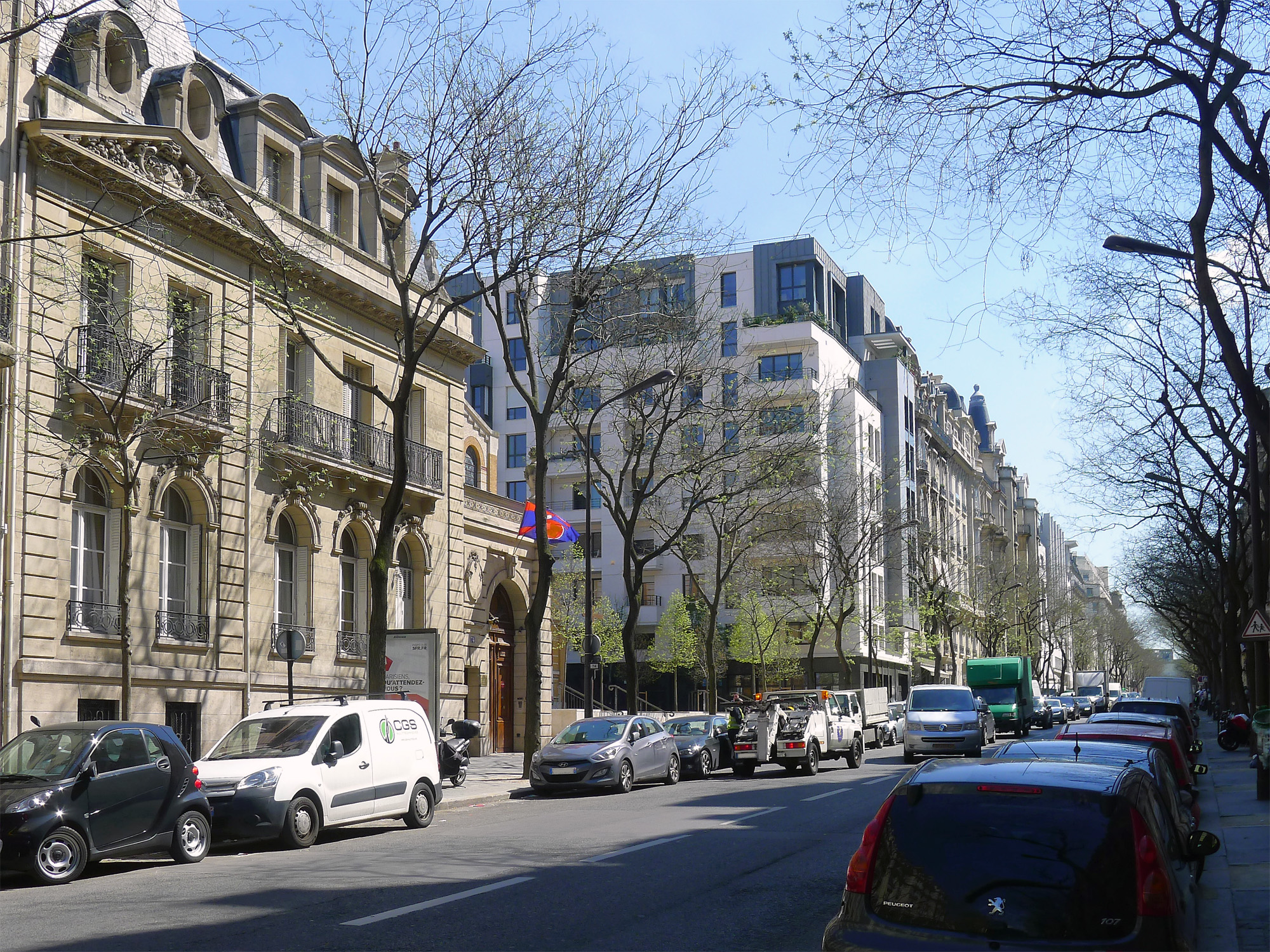
Embassy of Laos in Paris

== See also ==
- Laotians in France
