= Margaret Hasse =

American poet and writer

Margaret Hasse (born 1950, in South Dakota), is a poet and writer who has lived and worked in Minnesota since graduating from Stanford University in 1973. Three of her collections of poems have been published: Milk and Tides (Nodin Press, 2008), In a Sheep's Eye, Darling (Milkweed Editions, 1988), and Stars Above, Stars Below (New Rivers Press, 1984.) Milk and Tides was a finalist for a 2009 Minnesota Book Award and won the Midwestern Independent Publishers' Association award in poetry.

Margaret Hasse has been awarded fellowships in poetry from the National Endowment for the Arts, The Loft Literary Center, Minnesota State Arts Board, and the McKnight Foundation. She has presented at the AWP Writers Conference and teaches at the nationally acclaimed Loft Literary Center.

== Works ==
Milk and Tides, ISBN 978-1-932472-75-2

In a Sheep's Eye, Darling, ISBN 0-915943-25-5

Stars Above, Stars Below, ISBN 0-89823-056-X
