= Saymoukda Vongsay =

American poet

- Born: 1981 (age 44–45); Nong Khai, Thailand
- Education: University of Minnesota, Morris

Saymoukda Duangphouxay Vongsay is a Minnesota-based Lao American spoken word poet, playwright, and community activist. She was born in 1981 in a refugee camp in Nong Khai, Thailand. In 2020, she received a National Playwright Residency Program grant from the Andrew W. Mellon Foundation.

== Education ==
She received her B.A. in English from the University of Minnesota, Morris. She received a Master in Liberal Studies focused on public policy and arts and cultural leadership from the University of Minnesota.

== Poetry and writing ==
Vongsay's award-winning poem, “When Everything Was Everything,” is taught by language arts educators in the Saint Paul Public Schools’ curriculum. She is the author of No Regrets, a chapbook collection of poetry and haikus published by Baby Rabbit Publishing in 2007. Her writings can be found in the Hmong Women Write Now! Anthology, Poetry City USA Vol. 4, Lao American Speculative Anthology, Lessons For Our Time, and The Asian American Literary Review. Additional work has been published by Altra Magazine, Journal of Southeast Asian American Education and Advancement, St. Paul Almanac, Lao American Magazine, Hmong Today, and Bakka Literary Journal.

In 2010, Vongsay was the recipient of the inaugural Alfred C. Carey Prize in Spoken Word Poetry. She has received scholarships from the Loft Literary Center (MN/prose seminar), the Joyce Foundation/Alliance of Artist Communities (IL/arts administration), the Asian Economic Development Association (MN/advocacy), and the Southeast Asia Resource Action Center (DC/public policy). She has lent her experience in literary arts, programming, and community engagement to organizations such as the Smithsonian Institution (DC), the Southeast Asian Resource and Action Center (DC), Legacies of War (DC), Mines Advisory Group, Lao Assistance Center of Minnesota, the MN Historical Society, Paj Ntaub Voice Literary Journal, and the Traditional Arts and Ethnology Centre in Luang Prabang, Laos.

Vongsay has performed and taught creative writing workshops across the United States and internationally in Italy and Japan. In her decade of experience as a spoken word poet, she has grown tremendously by learning from and having shared the stage with Danny Solis, Laura Piece Kelley, Blitz the Ambassador, Doomtree, Bao Phi, David Mura, Kelly Tsai, Regie Cabico, Yellow Rage, Ed Bok Lee, and Stacey Ann Chin, among others. Other notable readings she has organized include Lao'd and Clear (2004) at the Loft Literary Center and Operation: Gynocracy (2010) at the Black Dog Cafe.

She was a co-chair of the first Lao American Writers Summit in Minnesota in 2010 and actively supports the work of Lao women writers and artists to celebrate heritage, diversity and community development. She has also served as a regular contributor to MPR's weekly podcast The Interpreters.

== Theater, art, and film ==
Vongsay's plays have been presented by Mu Performing Arts, The Unit Collective, Minnesota Fringe Festival, The Playwrights' Center, and the Consortium of Asian American Theater Artists. Vongsay wrote and performed Hmong-Lao Friendship Play / Lao-Hmong Friendship Play with May-Lee Yang in 2015. Vongsay's critically acclaimed play Kung Fu Zombies vs Cannibals was described as "a groundbreaking hip-hop martial arts epic" by Asian American Press and was named “Best Production of 2013” by L’etoile Magazine. Yellowtail Sashimi was part of the 2010 MN Fringe Festival. Vongsay is a 2011 Jerome Foundation/Mu Performing Arts' New Eyes Theater Fellow, has received a grant fellowship from the Minnesota State Arts Board's Folk and Traditional Arts to study traditional Lao storytelling, and is a co-founding member of the Unit Collective of Emerging Playwrights of Color. In 2012, she joined the board of directors for Intermedia Arts and the Asian Pacific Endowment Fund of the St. Paul Foundation. Vongsay was an Advisory Board member of the 2010 MPLS Asian Film Festival, which was presented by The Film Society/Minnesota Film Arts.

She was a featured artist for the Sulu Series in Washington DC, Philadelphia, and New York, a three-city monthly showcase of emerging and established Asian American artists, founded by Taiyo Na.

== Community engagement ==
Vongsay has worked as a programs coordinator and consultant on community-based projects, research analysis, grant writing, program planning and evaluation, and community assessment. She has previously worked with the Anchorage Urban League of Young Professionals, lecturing and performing at local high schools and at the university level to urge voter registration and civic engagement, and she also served as liaison between local government and the Southeast Asian community regarding public policy in Alaska.

Vongsay is Chair of the Twin Cities World Refugee Day festival planning committee, is a COMPAS and East Side Arts Council teaching artist, and serves on the board of directors for Intermedia Arts, Saint Paul Almanac, and Ananya Dance Theatre. Vongsay has been recognized as a 2011 Change Maker by Intermedia Arts and the office of Governor Dayton for her work in the community and her contributions and leadership in the state's Lao arts movement. In 2011 she joined the Council on Asian Pacific Minnesotans as the Cultural Coordinator, where she oversaw funding from the 2008 Legacy Act to benefit Asian Pacific cultural initiatives in the state.
