= Seattle Women's Commission =

The Seattle Women's Commission is a commission in the city of Seattle, Washington, responsible for advising the mayor, city council, and city departments on issues related to women residents. It was founded in 1972 by Jeanette Williams.

The commission is composed of twenty representatives appointed by the mayor and Seattle City Council. Commissioners serve a two-year appointment on a volunteer basis.

== Jeanette Williams Award ==
Since 2003, the Seattle Women's Commission in partnership with the Seattle Office for Civil Rights have granted the Jeanette Williams Award to recognize individuals, organizations, and businesses who demonstrate significant leadership and service in advancing the cause of women in Seattle. The award is granted on an annual basis.
