= John Cavanagh (economist) =

American economist

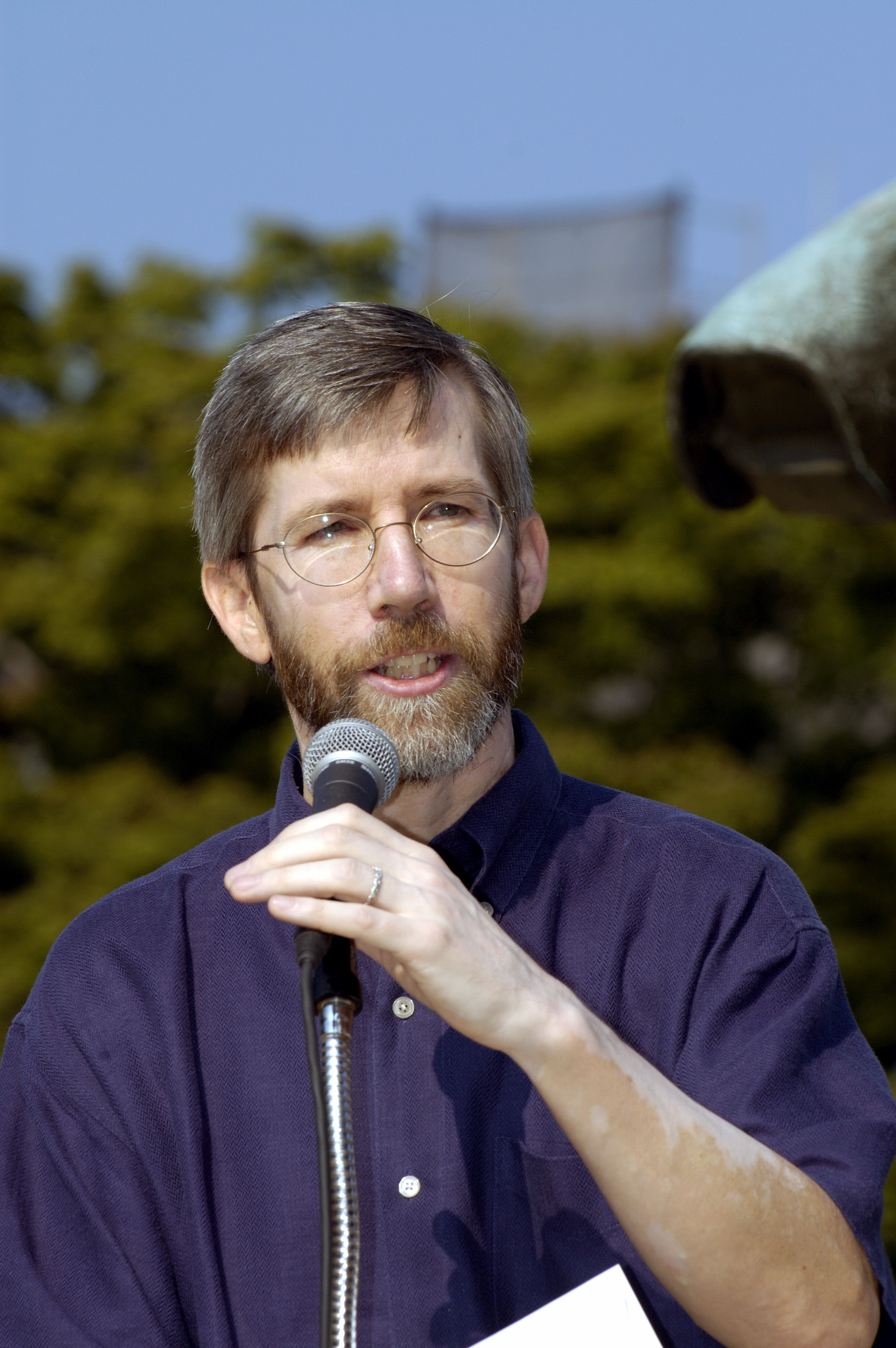
- Born: August 20, 1955 (age 71)
- Education: Dartmouth College (B.A.); Princeton University (M.A.)
- Occupation: Economist

John Cavanagh (born August 20, 1955) is an American activist. He was the Director of the Institute for Policy Studies in Washington, D.C. from 1998 to 2021, and is a founding fellow of the Transnational Institute.

== Career ==
Cavanagh earned a B.A. from Dartmouth College and an M.A. from Princeton University.

He worked as an international economist for the United Nations Conference on Trade and Development from 1978 to 1981, and the World Health Organization from 1981 to 1982. He directed IPS's Global Economy Project from 1983 to 1997.

Cavanagh works closely with the Congressional Progressive Caucus and the AFL–CIO. Cavanagh currently sits on the board of directors of the International Forum on Globalization.

== Works ==
He is the co-author of 12 books and numerous articles on social and economic issues.

- John Cavanagh; Daphne Wysham; Marcos Arruda (1994). Beyond Bretton Woods: alternatives to the global economic order. Pluto Press. ISBN 978-0-7453-0890-6.
- Richard J. Barnet; John Cavanagh (March 1, 1995). Global Dreams: Imperial Corporations and the New World Order. Touchstone. ISBN 978-0-684-80027-1.
- Sarah Denny Anderson; John Cavanagh (January 2005). The Field Guide to the Global Economy. New Press. ISBN 978-1-56584-956-3.
- Robin Broad; John Cavanagh (2009). Development redefined: how the market met its match. Paradigm Publishers. ISBN 978-1-59451-522-4.
- John Cavanagh; Jerry Mander (October 10, 2004). Alternatives to Economic Globalization. Berrett-Koehler Publishers. ISBN 978-1-60509-409-0.
