= Yellow Rage =

Yellow Rage is a duo of Philadelphia-based Asian American female spoken word poets, made up of Michelle Myers, who holds a PhD from Temple University, and Catzie Vilayphonh, the Fashion Director for two.one.five magazine. Their poems are self-written and are often based on personal experiences, focussing on social and political issues relevant to the Asian American community and aiming to challenge common misconceptions of Asianness. The performances are often aggressive and include frequent swearing, but also include wit and humor.

== Career ==
=== Formation ===
The group was originally a trio, along with former member Sapna Shah. Shah is of Indian descent, Vilayphonh is Lao, and Myers is mixed-race Korean American. They met at a writing workshop in Philadelphia in 2000 at the Asian Arts Initiative. Their first group poem, I'm a Woman Not a Flava, about misappropriation of Asian culture as well as sexual stereotypes placed on Asian females, was originally a solo poem written by Myers. They first performed the piece in September 2000 at the Asian Arts Initiative.

They adopted the name Black Hair, Brown Eyes, Yellow Rage when they performed I'm A Woman Not a Flava at the Russell Simmons' Def Poetry Slam in December 2000 in Philadelphia. The group made the semi-finals, and were asked by the Def Poetry producers to audition for another show in New York City, which they won.

In February 2001, along with Taylor Mali, Jessica Care Moore, Black Ice, and Steve Colman, they performed in Aspen, Colorado at the HBO U.S. Comedy Arts Festival, gaining a standing ovation, footage of which was used as the television pilot for the HBO Series Def Poetry. After this, Shah left the group to focus on her medical studies.

Myers and Vilayphonh continued as a duo, shortening the name to Yellow Rage. In late summer 2001 they performed for HBO's Russell Simmons Def Poetry Jam, the first Asian American women to be filmed on the show. They performed Listen Asshole, remixed into a group poem, based on Vilayphonh's experience speaking Lao in public with her mother and Myers' experience of being mis-identified, which first aired in December 2001.

=== Performances ===
Yellow Rage has performed all over the U.S. including at the 2001 APIA Spoken Word Summit in Seattle and the 2001 NY International Fringe Festival in the show Asians Misbehavin. In August 2002, the Leeway Foundation awarded Yellow Rage a Windows of Opportunity Grant which enabled them to travel to Oahu, Hawaii where they performed for the local poetry organization/collective Wordstew and attended the Globalization Research Center's Trafficking of Asian Women and Children Conference. They took part in Philadelphia Ladyfest in March 2003. They have performed alongside many other artists including Ursula Rucker, Pharoahe Monch, Native Guns, The Pacifics, Chops, Dave Chappelle, Beau Sia, Bao Phi, I Was Born With Two Tongues, Danny Hoch, and Black Ice.

== Discography ==
They have released two spoken word albums, Black Hair, Brown Eyes, Yellow Rage, Vol. 1 in 2002 and Vol. 2 Handle with Care.
