= The Betrayal – Nerakhoon =

2008 documentary film by Ellen Kuras and Thavisouk Phrasavath

The Betrayal — Nerakhoon
- Promotional film poster
- Directed by: Ellen Kuras; Thavisouk Phrasavath
- Written by: Ellen Kuras; Thavisouk Phrasavath
- Narrated by: Thavisouk Phrasavath
- Cinematography: Ellen Kuras
- Edited by: Thavisouk Phrasavath
- Music by: Howard Shore
- Distributed by: The Cinema Guild
- Release date: January 21, 2008
- Running time: 87 minutes
- Country: United States
- Language: English

The Betrayal — Nerakhoon is a 2008 documentary film directed by Ellen Kuras and Thavisouk Phrasavath.

== Synopsis ==
It is about an immigrant from Laos living in New York City. The film centres on the family's flight from Laos after the United States Secret War in Laos and the difficulty of assimilating into American life. Cultural obstacles encountered are presented through the medium of the break-up of the narrators' family, culminating in the death of a family member linked to gang warfare.

In the Lao language, "nerakhoon" (Lao: ເນລະຄຸນ) translates to "ingratitude" or "betrayal".

== Reception ==
=== Critical response ===
The Betrayal has an approval rating of 93% on review aggregator website Rotten Tomatoes, based on 30 reviews, and an average rating of 7.63/10. It also has a score of 78 out of 100 on Metacritic, based on 10 critics, indicating "generally favorable reviews".

=== Film Festivals and Accolades ===
The Betrayal won the Spectrum Award at the Full Frame Documentary Film Festival (2008), and screened within such festivals as Maryland Film Festival.

In 2009, The Betrayal – Nerakhoon was Nominated for an Oscar at the 81st Academy Awards for Best Documentary Features.

Also in 2009, The Betrayal was nominated for an Independent Spirit Award.

It was shown in the Documentary Competition at the 2008 Sundance Film Festival.

The Betrayal – Nerakhoon won the 2010 Creative Arts Primetime Emmy Award for Exceptional Merit in Nonfiction Filmmaking.

It also won Student Doc Award at Sheffield Doc/Fest in 2012.

== Release ==
The film was released on home video by The Cinema Guild.
