= Conference on Asian Pacific American Leadership =

AAPI public policy organization

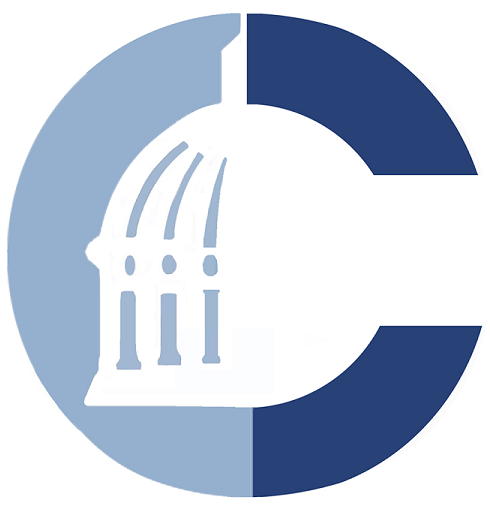
Conference on Asian Pacific American Leadership (CAPAL)'s Official Logo

The Conference on Asian Pacific American Leadership (CAPAL) is a "nonprofit, nonpartisan educational and professional organization dedicated to building leadership and public policy knowledge within the Asian American and Pacific Islander (AAPI) community." In 1989, Lin Liu, Sandra Yamane, Sharon Yanagi, Melinda Yee, Paul Igasaki, Rod Hsiao, and Chantale Wong, founded CAPAL in Washington D.C. in order to address the lack of Asian American Pacific Islander representation in public service. In almost 30 years, the organization has grown from an all-volunteer nonprofit organization to one with a Board of Directors, Staff, and Advisory Council.

== Programs ==
=== Washington Leadership Program ===
The Washington Leadership Program is a free panel-based summer series offered by CAPAL each year that is open to anyone who would like to attend in the DC area, particularly interns and young professionals. The series features Asian American Pacific Islander (AAPI) leaders within the DC community who represent the public and private sectors, as they discuss pertinent issues affecting the AAPI community. Topics range from environmental justice to mental health, and these dialogues create a learning space where interns can interact with the panelists and each during and after the presentations, panel discussions, and Q&A sections with public service leaders. WLP has been the only educational and leadership development working series in the city that focuses specifically on the AAPI community and AAPI individuals' roles in public policy.

=== Federal Internship Program ===
This program places student applicants in federal offices in Washington DC, with opportunities to be placed in regional offices. Each intern is required to attend all of the Washington Leadership Program Sessions and complete a Community Action Project (CAP). The CAP is a group project that fulfills a community service requirement to develop a tangible way to connect personal and professional goals and reflections, giving back to communities important to each intern. At the end of each summer, CAP groups present their projects to sponsors, board members, and other invited guests at the intern Closing Ceremony.

=== Public Service Scholarship Program ===
Within this program, scholarships are awarded to students completing unpaid internships in public service work in the metropolitan DC area over the summer. They are expected to fulfill the same requirements as those accepted to CAPAL's Federal Internship Program, attending every Washington Leadership Program Session and completing their CAP Projects.

== Collaborations ==
CAPAL hosts a variety of alternate events with the government, primarily for but not necessarily limited to each class of scholars and interns within CAPAL. A common partner is with the United States Fish and Wildlife Service to provide USA Jobs training through a Conservation Careers Symposium, which promotes careers in service dealing specifically with natural resource management and biological sciences. The organization also works with other AAPI groups such as the Japanese American Citizens League (JACL) and the Organization of Chinese Americans (OCA) to promote solidarity within their specific communities, hosting programs such as APIA-U: Leadership Trainings in collaboration with OCA.
