= Laotian diaspora =

People of Laotian descent

Total population
- c. 800,000

Regions with significant populations
- Thailand: 288,000
- United States: 245,220 (2022)
- France: 200,000
- Canada: 24,580
- Cambodia: 21,600
- Myanmar: 17,000
- Vietnam: 14,900
- Australia: 12,372
- South Korea: 10,520
- Germany: 4,000
- Japan: 3,859 (2023)
- Singapore: 2,401
- Argentina: 1,800
- New Zealand: 1,374
- Belgium: 1,067
- United Kingdom: 1,000
- Switzerland: 1,000
- Sweden: 1,000
- New Caledonia: 1,000
- Guyana: 1,000
- Taiwan: 60
- Russia: 18
- Philippines: 13

The Laotian diaspora consists of roughly 800,000 people who are descendants of emigrants from Laos.

== History ==
The Laotian diaspora can be categorized into three categories based on time.

- The first consists of Laotians who have lived outside Laos before the French colonization of the country. Members of this group live almost exclusively in Thailand, either part of the forced migrations by the Siamese or by modern border definitions, as a result of the Siamese annexation of the Isan region following the decline of the kingdom of Lan Xang in the 1700s.
- The second category consists of Laotians who studied or worked in France and Vietnam during Laos' colonial period and then settled those countries.
- The third category consists of the largest number of overseas Laotians, who fled the country following the communist Pathet Lao takeover of Laos as a result of the Vietnam War. This group of the Laotian diaspora primarily live in North America, France and Australia, with a smaller number in Thailand.

There has been a newer group of Laotians living overseas. Members of this group primarily consist of newer emigrants or expatriates who live in industrialized nations for years before returning home.

== Asia ==
=== Thailand ===
A Laotian population has been present in the Isan region of Thailand since the 13th century, when the Lao kingdom of Lan Xang annexed the region following the Khmer Empire's downfall. The kingdom of Siam later took over the region in the 1700s after Lan Xang's decline and the present boundaries between Laos and Thailand were established in 1907, with the region officially coming under Thai control. While this earlier group of Laotians speak a language mutually intelligible with Lao, they are identified as a separate ethnic group due to Thaification policies as a result of the Thai government seeing strong Lao influence in the country as a threat to its power.

A number of Laotians fled to Thailand following the communist takeover of Laos, with the country being a stopover for refugees before their immigration to North America, France or Australia. Laotian refugees who settled in Thailand live predominately in the Isan region and in cities such as Bangkok and Chiang Mai.

=== Cambodia ===
There are an estimated 21,600 people of ethnic Lao descent living in Cambodia, primarily in the northern part of the country. Laotians first arrived in Cambodia during the country's French colonial period as laborers for plantations and fishermen. A larger number of Laotians later arrived following the collapse of Democratic Kampuchea to escape communism in Laos. There has been a number of Laotian expatriates in Cambodia due to increased economic cooperation between the two countries.

=== Vietnam ===
There are an estimated 14,900 ethnic Lao living in Vietnam, mostly in the northern provinces of Lai Chau, Dien Bien and Son La. Laotian presence in the country was accelerated during the French colonization of Indochina, when Laotian students were able to move to Hanoi and receive higher education at the city's French institutions. Some Laotian government workers were trained by the colonial government in Hanoi. A number of Laotian laborers were recruited to work in the rice fields and mines of northern Vietnam, and some remained in the country following its independence from France.

== North America ==
=== United States ===
In the 2010 United States census, there were about 200,000 Americans of Laotian descent living the United States, making them the largest overseas Laotian community outside Asia. They tend to live in metropolitan areas on the West Coast and Upper Midwest. Areas with highest Laotian population include the San Francisco Bay Area, Greater Sacramento, Minneapolis–Saint Paul, Dallas–Fort Worth metroplex, and the Seattle metropolitan area. There is a community which settled in the Lane Xang Village of south Louisiana in Iberia Parish.

Laotian Americans are not associated with the model minority image that includes other Asian ethnic groups such as Chinese, Korean, Japanese, and Vietnamese Americans.

=== Canada ===
As of the 2016 Canada Census, there were about 24,000 Canadians of Laotian descent in the country, with nearly three-quarters of the population living in Ontario and Quebec.

Refugees consist of more than half of all Laotian Canadians. Theravada Buddhist temples serve as the group's community and cultural centers.

== France ==
The number of ethnic Laotians living in France was estimated to be around 140,000 in 2014. The majority of Laotians in France live in Paris and the surrounding Île-de-France region, with smaller communities in Marseille, Lille and Strasbourg.

France was the first Western country to where Laotian migrants settled due to the colonization of Laos by France in the 20th century. A number of students and workers of the elite class were the first Lao migrants to France. Laotian immigration to France became more visible after the influx of refugees after the Vietnam War in 1975. Unlike their counterpart communities in North America, Germany, and Australia, French Laotians are regarded as a model minority in French politics and society.

== Oceania ==
=== Australia ===
There are about 12,000 people of Laotian descent in Australia.

Laotian Australians primarily live in the metropolitan areas of Sydney and Melbourne. Some ethnic Lao organizations and Theravada Buddhist temples help to serve the community.

=== New Zealand ===
Most of the population of Laotian New Zealanders consists of refugees who arrived in the country in the 1970s and 1980s. Community associations based in Theravada Buddhist temples help to serve the social needs of the population.

== Argentina ==
About 3,800 people of Laotian descent live in Argentina. Laotian refugees first arrived in the country after the Vietnam War in 1975 and settled in Buenos Aires as part of a United Nations sponsored program. The community changed with the founding of a Theravada Buddhist temple (while some have converted to Roman Catholicism) and Laotian-owned businesses.
