= List of Hmong people =

This is a list of some well-known Hmong individuals throughout the world, including notable Hmong Americans and individuals of Hmong and Miao descent. The Hmong are an Asian ethnic group originating from the regions of China, Vietnam, Laos, and Thailand, with significant diaspora communities globally, particularly in the United States.

== Academics ==
- Dia Cha, author, former professor and anthropologist, St. Cloud State University, Minnesota
- Mai Na Lee, historian and University of Minnesota professor
- Vang Pobzeb, PhD. Laos and Hmong Scholar; founder and past President of Lao Human Rights Council, Inc.
- Kou Yang, Hmong scholar and professor
- Zha Blong Xiong, first Hmong professor

== Actors ==
- Ahney Her, actress, best known as Sue Lor in Gran Torino
- Doua Moua, actor, known for Gran Torino and Disney's Mulan.
- Brenda Song, Disney channel actress/teen star, known for The Suite Life of Zack & Cody and The Suite Life on Deck; Song is an anglicized spelling of "Xiong"
- Bee Vang, actor, best known as Thao Vang Lor in Gran Torino

== Artists ==
- Cao Lu, idol singer of Korean group Fiestar
- Pao Houa Her, photographer, first Hmong graduate of Yale University's Photography MFA program, 2023 Guggenheim Fellow, featured artist in the 2022 Whitney Biennial.
- Payengxa Lor, the first Hmong woman to be crowned as Miss Universe Laos 2022 and was one of the Top 16 contestants in Miss Universe 2022.
- Song Zuying, 宋祖英, ethnic Miao Chinese singer
- Lexus ”Lexi” Vang, contestant of survival show A2K, member of global girl group Girlset, and first Hmong American K-pop idol.
- Yia Vang, Hmong-American chef
- Laolee Xiong, founder of The Vocal Network a cappella group and Techapella singing showcase
- Luj Yaj, singer from Thailand

== Athletes ==
- Xiong Chaozhong, Xiong Zhong Zhao, Miao light flyweight boxer of Wenshan, China
- Sunisa Lee, artistic gymnast, first Hmong-American to qualify for the US Olympic Team, 2020/2021 all-around Olympic gold medalist, and 2024 all-around Olympic Bronze Medalist
- Long Qingquan, 龙清泉, Miao Olympian; won a gold medal in Men's 56 kg weightlifting for China in the 2008 Beijing Olympics
- Michael Vang, soccer player
- Zou Shiming, 邹市明, the most successful amateur boxer from the People's Republic of China; won two world titles in 2005 and 2007 and the gold medal at the 2008 Summer Olympics in the light flyweight (-48 kg) division

== Authors ==
- Houa Vue Moua, author and community activist
- Shen Congwen, Miao Chinese writer from the May Fourth Movement
- Ka Vang, writer
- Kao Kalia Yang, Hmong American writer; author of The Latehomecomer: A Hmong Family Memoir; her work has appeared in the Paj Ntaub Voice Hmong Literary Journal and numerous other publications
- Mai Neng Moua, writer

== Community Leaders ==
- Cherzong Vang, St. Paul Community Leader; Lao and Hmong veterans' leader, Lao Veterans of America
- Wangyee Vang, President of Lao Veterans of America Institute; Lao and Hmong community veterans' leader

== Military Leaders ==
- Vua Mèo (1865 - 1947) was a H'Mong king with his kingdom in Dong Van district, Ha Giang province, Vietnam
- Qin Liangyu, Miao Chinese General of the Ming Dynasty; highest ranking female general of Chinese history
- Lieutenant Colonel Hang Sao, known for being apart of the Laotion Civil War.
- Vang Pao, Royal Lao Army Major General; revered Hmong Leader; commander of CIA-supported Hmong forces during the Laotian Civil War
- Pa Chay Vue, a leading member of the Madman's War, a rebellion against the French colonialism in Southeast Asia, especially in Vietnam.
- Vu Pa Chay, a Hmong leader who revolted against the French imperialist in northern Vietnam and Laos
- Zong Zoua Her, a Hmong anti-Pathet Lao and leader of a resistant group in Laos.

== Politicians ==
- Kaohly Her, Minnesota State Representative and mayor of Saint Paul
- Foung Hawj, pioneer Hmong-American broadcaster; media artist; Minnesota State Senator elected in 2012
- Pa Kao Her, after the Secret War in Laos, Her fled to Thailand and organized a political movement to take back the country of Laos.
- Lormong Lo, former Omaha City Councilman
- Noah Lor, first Hmong American to be elected Mayor Pro-Tempore in the City of Merced's history; elected as city councilman in Merced in 2007 and re-elected again in 2011
- Steve Ly, First Mayor in the United States of America of Hmong descent - Mayor of Elk Grove, California
- Touby Lyfoung, Hmong politician in Laos, served in several ministries in the Royal Lao Government, and key adviser to the King. After the war, Lyfoung was captured and tortured to death by the Communist Pathet Lao.
- Mee Moua, Minnesota State Senator
- Susan Pha, Minnesota State Senator
- Cy Thao, Minnesota State Representative
- Sheng Thao, First Hmong Woman to serve on the Oakland City Council
- Mai Vang, first Hmong elected to Sacramento City Council in 2020.
- Joe Bee Xiong, first Hmong American elected to public office in the state of Wisconsin, serving two terms as Eau Claire City councilman
- Mai Xiong, Michigan state representative
- Yee Leng Xiong, 38th treasurer of Wisconsin and first of Hmong descent to be elected to statewide office.
- Pany Yathotou, the first Hmong woman to become the vice president of Laos and is currently serving alongside Bounthong Chitmany. She was the chairwoman and governor of the Bank of the Lao P.D.R from 1988 to 1997. She was also the President of the National Assembly of Laos from 2010 to 2021.

== Religious Leaders ==
- Chervang Kong Vang, minister who established United Christians Liberty Evangelical Church, the first Hmong independent church organization, and also the creator of the Nyiakeng Puachue Hmong script.
- Wang Zhiming, Miao pastor; memorialized above the Great West Door of Westminster Abbey

== Other Notable People ==
- Khoua Her, a mother who strangled her six children
- Lia Lee, subject of the 1997 book The Spirit Catches You and You Fall Down
- Chai Vang, ex-National Guardsman; convicted multiple murderer
- Lan Yezhen, granddaughter of Lan Heguang, a Miao king in Jianshui County, Yunnan, and mistress of Sun Fo, son of Sun Yat-sen.

=== Entrepreneurs ===
- Xao "Jerry" Yang, 2007 World Series of Poker Main Event Champion and currently owner of several sushi-inspired restaurants in Las Vegas and California.

=== Journalists ===
- Doualy Xaykaothao, freelance American journalist and radio producer known for her work with NPR

=== Legal Professionals ===
- Kao Ly Ilean Her, attorney, activist, and first Hmong woman to pass the bar exam in Minnesota
