= Kou Yang =

Hmong American academic

- Kub Yaj
- Pronunciation: /kuː/ KOO; White Hmong: [kú ʝâ]
- Born: 1954; Sayaboury Province, Laos
- Died: February 6, 2021 (aged 66–67); Modesto, California, U.S.
- Burial place: Turlock Memorial Park, Turlock, California
- Years active: 1980–2019
- Board member of: Hmong National Development; Southeast Asian American Professionals Association
- Awards: Fulbright Scholar; Sasakawa Fellow

Academic background
- Education: Long Beach City College (AA); California State University, Fresno (BA & MSW); Joint Doctoral Program in Educational Leadership at California State University, Fresno, and the University of California, Davis (EdD)
- Thesis: The Hmong in Fresno: a study of Hmong welfare participation and self-sufficiency (1995)

Academic work
- Discipline: Ethnic studies
- Sub-discipline: Asian American studies
- Institutions: California State University, Stanislaus (1998-2013)
- Main interests: Hmong diaspora

Kou Yang (/kuː/ KOO; White Hmong: [kú ʝâ]; 1954 – February 6, 2021) was a Hmong American scholar, author, and professor at California State University, Stanislaus. He was a leading researcher in the field of Hmong diaspora studies and was one of the first Hmong to gain a doctoral degree and become a professor.

== Early life and education ==
Kou Yang was born in Sayaboury Province, Laos, circa 1954. He was said to be 49 years old in 2006. His eighteen member family lived in a rural highland Hmong village.

His formal education began when he was sent to the lowland school Sayaboury Elementary School (Group Scholaire de Sayaboury) in the province's capital city Sayaboury, where he completed up to sixth grade. He continued at College de Sayaboury, the province's junior high school, and graduated summer of 1974. Briefly he attended Lycee de Luang Phrabang and Ecole Normal de Luang Phrabang to prepare for post-secondary education, but was unable to complete his studies when the Laotian Civil War ended in 1975.

Yang fled to a refugee camp in Thailand. In 1976 at 21 years old, he and three brothers resettled in New Orleans, Louisiana. He became a permanent US resident five years later in 1981 and petitioned for relatives to get travel visas to the US.

Although he had been studying for post-secondary education in Laos, Yang's early employment in the US was as a dishwasher. While Yang could read, write, and speak the Hmong, Lao, Thai, and French languages, he struggled to reach competency in English, which was a barrier to employment and education.

Yang relocated to Long Beach, California in 1979 and earned his associates degree from Long Beach City College in 1982. The associates degree improved his English. Once in Fresno, he earned a bachelor's degree and master's degree in social work from California State University, Fresno in 1987 and 1991 respectively. He ultimately graduated Doctor of Education from the Joint Doctoral Program in Educational Leadership at California State University, Fresno and the University of California, Davis in 1995.

== Career ==
Kou Yang was an associate professor of Asian American studies at California State University, Stanislaus and joined the faculty fall semester 1998 as an assistant professor. He was the first Hmong person to be part of an ethnic studies department and the second Hmong faculty member at CSU. Tony Vang was the only other Hmong faculty member at CSU. At the time, Yang was the sixth Hmong person to be hired by a US university.

Dissatisfied with cuts to course offerings and delayed faculty recruitment, which was viewed as diluting the ethnic studies program, Yang was one of two ethnic studies faculty that announced in May 2013 they would resign at the end of the year. He retired from teaching December 2014. During his tenure at CSU, Yang was the Chair of the Ethnic & Gender Studies Department and became Professor Emeritus of Ethnic Studies. He was also part of the editorial review board of Journal of Southeast Asian American Education & Advancement, published by National Association for the Education & Advancement of Cambodian, Laotian, and Vietnamese Americans (NAFEA).

Yang Sao Xiong, Nengher N. Vang, and Chia Youyee Vang list Kou Yang as part of the "second wave" of ethnic Hmong scholars, along with scholars such as Zha Blong Xiong and Dia Cha.

=== Scholarship ===
In his work, Kou Yang proposed a framework that divides Hmong American history into three eras: the Refugee Years (1975–1991), the Turning Point (1992–1999), and the "Hmong American period" (2000–present). The Refugee Years are characterized by Hmong newly arriving in the United States in 1975 and interacting with social services. The election of Choua Lee to the Saint Paul, Minnesota Public Schools Board of Education in November 1991, who took office 1992, marked the beginning of the Turning Point, where Hmong became politically active and saw a wave of "secondary migration" from their original resettlement locations to one of several hubs of concentrated Hmong population in the US, particularly Saint Paul. Yang proposed the Hmong American Period from 2000 onward, and described it as sustained political success by Hmong candidates.

Yang argued that much of the early understanding of Hmong American history was inaccurate because of works that promoted unproven theories about Hmong history. Scholars whose work he criticised for inaccuracy include Jane Hamilton-Merritt and Anne Fadiman, who wrote the bestselling book The Spirit Catches You and You Fall Down.

Another focus of Yang's work was Hmong ancestry in China. He gained attention from Chinese academics that study Miao peoples in China for his written scholarship and research travel connecting Hmong Americans to Hmong in China, particularly his commentary on how the Belt and Road Initiative would affect the rural Hmong who occupy the borders between China, Laos, and Vietnam.

== Personal life ==
As a Lao Hmong American, Yang favored the United States normalizing trade relations with Laos, a controversial stance among Hmong refugees, many of whom sided with the United States during the Vietnam War and Laotian Civil War.

Yang died at Kaiser Hospital in Modesto, California, on February 6, 2021. His family and news outlets reported his death as complications from COVID-19. He was buried at Turlock Memorial Park in Turlock, California, during a private service owing to COVID-19 restrictions.

== Works ==
=== Books ===
- Pfeifer, Mark Edward; Chiu, Monica; Yang, Kou, eds. (January 31, 2013). Diversity in Diaspora: Hmong Americans in the Twenty-First Century. University of Hawai'i Press. doi:10.21313/hawaii/9780824835972.001.0001. ISBN 978-0-8248-3597-2. Project MUSE 21545 Diversity in Diaspora at Google Books.
- Yang, Kou (2017). The Making of Hmong America: Forty Years After the Secret War. Lanham, Maryland: Lexington Books. ISBN 978-1-4985-4645-4. OCLC 990266491. The Making of Hmong America at Google Books.
- Yang, Kou; et al. (2004). Hmong 2000 Census Publication: Data & Analysis (PDF). Washington, DC: Hmong National Development; Hmong Cultural Center. OCLC 56978316. Hmong 2000 Census Publication: Data & Analysis at Google Books. Hmong 2000 Census Publication: Data & Analysis at the HathiTrust Digital Library
- Duffy, John; Ranard, Donald A.; Yang, Kou; et al. (June 2004). The Hmong: An Introduction to Their History and Culture (PDF). Washington, D.C.: Center for Applied Linguistics, Cultural Orientation Resource Center. OCLC 56138399.
- Yang, Kou; Hartwick, Douglas A. (2013). Laos and Its Expatriates in the United States: A Memoir of an American Professor. Baltimore, MD: PublishAmerica. ISBN 978-1-4626-9305-4. OCLC 855903711.
- Yang, Kou (2019). Sayaboury: The Land of a Million Elephants. Saint Paul, MN: HER Publisher. ISBN 978-1-64410-003-5. OCLC 1090415670.
- Yang, Kou (2015). The Hmong & Their Odyssey: A Roots-Searching Journey of an American Professor. ISBN 978-0-692-75670-6. OCLC 971497321.
- Yang, Kou; Church World Service; Asian Pacific Family Outreach, Inc (1980). Khaws kwutxhiaj hmoob (in Hmong). Long Beach, CA: Hmong Acculturation Classes. OCLC 952500877.

=== Articles ===
- Yang, Kou (June 2001). "Research Note: The Hmong in America: Twenty-Five Years after the U.S. Secret War in Laos". Journal of Asian American Studies. 4 (2). Johns Hopkins University Press: 165–174. doi:10.1353/jaas.2001.0019. OCLC 4639277328. Project MUSE 14629.
- —— (2001). "Becoming American: The Hmong American Experience". Ethnic Studies Review. 24 (2). University of California Press: 58–84. doi:10.1525/esr.2001.24.1.58. ISSN 1555-1881. OCLC 8163593437.
- —— (September 2003). "Hmong Diaspora of the Post-War Period". Asian and Pacific Migration Journal. 12 (3). Scalabrini Migration Center: 271–300. doi:10.1177/011719680301200302. ISSN 0117-1968. OCLC 5722289321. addtl. OCLC 5796016530
- —— (2009). "Commentary: Challenges and Complexity in the Re-Construction of Hmong History". Hmong Studies Journal. 10. Mark E. Pfeifer. ISSN 1091-1774. OCLC 7180060764.
- —— (2008). "A Visit to the Hmong of Asia: Globalization and Ethnicity at the Dawn of the 21st Century". Hmong Studies Journal. 9. Mark E. Pfeifer. ISSN 1091-1774. OCLC 8349071868. ProQuest 193881800.
- —— (2012). "Commentary: Mis-Education in K-12 Teaching about Hmong Culture, Identity, History and Religion". Hmong Studies Journal. 13 (1). Mark E. Pfeifer. ISSN 1091-1774. OCLC 8286270352.
- —— (2007). "An Assessment of the Hmong American New Year and Its Implications for Hmong-American Culture". Hmong Studies Journal. 8. Mark E. Pfeifer. ISSN 1091-1774. OCLC 8349115044.
- —— (2003). "Hmong Americans: A Review of Felt Needs, Problems, and Community Development". Hmong Studies Journal. 4. Mark E. Pfeifer. ISSN 1091-1774. OCLC 7179653609.
- —— (2005). "Research Notes from the Field: Tracing the Path of The Ancestors - A Visit to the Hmong in China". Hmong Studies Journal. 6. Mark E. Pfeifer. ISSN 1553-3972. ProQuest 220384285.
- Pfeifer, Mark E.; Sullivan, John; Yang, Kou; Yang, Wayne (2013). "Hmong Population and Demographic Trends in the 2010 Census & 2010 American Community Survey". The State of the Hmong American Community 2013 (PDF). Washington, D.C.: Hmong National Development, Hmong American Partnership. p. 8. OCLC 854682252.
- —— (1990). "From Indochina to Fresno: A Brief Look at the Plight of Indochinese in Fresno". In Howard, Katsuyo K. (ed.). Passages: An Anthology of the Southeast Asian Refugee Experience. Fresno, California: Southeast Asian Student Services, California State University, Fresno. pp. xix–xxv. ISBN 0-9627103-0-X. OCLC 22419272. Passages at Google Books. Passages at the HathiTrust Digital Library
- —— (December 1990). "The Mien Community in Fresno". Calisphere. Marshall (Brigitte) Files on Southeast Asian Refugees. Fresno, California: UC Irvine, Libraries, Southeast Asian Archive.

=== Columns ===
- Yang, Kou (April 4, 2015). "Prof. Kou Yang: The deadly, horrible mess we made still plagues Indochina". Modesto Bee. Modesto, California: McClatchy Media Network. Newspapers.com clipping 196395882 (from page 706287975).
- —— (November 23, 2016). "XIONG YANG, PH.D. (PRAYATH NANTASIN): The First Hmong Scientist To Do Research In Antarctica". Hmong Times. Saint Paul, Minnesota. pp. 1, 8–9. ProQuest 1848788222.
- —— (January 25, 2018). "The Passing Of Prince Sauryavong Savang, The Youngest And Last Child Of King Sisavanbg Vatthana". Hmong Times.
- —— (Winter 2002). "Hmong Vision: The Future of Hmong Americans". Hmong Movement: Emergence of the Hmong Student Coalition. Vol. 1, no. 1. Turlock, California: Hmong Students Inter-Collegiate Coalition. pp. 8–10.
- ——; Cha, Dia (August 2014). "A Visit to the Hmong of Vietnam". Hmong Tribune. Fresno, California. pp. 1, 7.
  - Part two printed as: ——; Cha, Dia (September 2014). "A Visit to the Hmong of Vietnam". Hmong Tribune. Fresno, California. pp. 1, 7.
- —— (March–April 2013). "Sayaboury: The Province of a Million Elephants". Sabaidee Magazine. Vol. 2, no. 8. pp. 50–52.
- —— (August 24, 2016). "Editorial: President Obama's Historic Visit to Laos Comes At the Perfect Time". Laotian Times. Newspapers.com clipping 196395784 (from page 706368725).

=== Theses ===
- Yang, Kou (1995). The Hmong in Fresno: a study of Hmong welfare participation and self-sufficiency (Doctor of Education thesis). California State University, Fresno. hdl:20.500.12680/1r66j8240. ISBN 9798208111727. OCLC 36986286. ProQuest UMI Microform number 9627756.

=== Children's books ===
- Yang, Kou; Yang, Vungping; Vue, Yinkong (2019). Nuj Yob : the Hmong jungle book. Saint Paul, MN: HER Publisher. ISBN 978-1-64410-006-6. OCLC 1112365623.

=== Audio/video ===
- Yang, Lang; Yang, Kou (1991), Sab nyob tom tsev (in Hmong), Nebo, NC: Lang Yang, OCLC 43786570
- Yang, Kou; Liaj Dawb Home Entertainment; Hmong International Filmmaker Organization (2010), Vim kuv yog hmoob = Because I am Hmong (in Hmong), St. Paul, MN: Liaj Dawb Home Entertainment, OCLC 689033309

== See also ==
- History of the Hmong in Fresno, California
- Mai Na Lee, another early Hmong academic
- Mark Pfeifer, academic who studied Hmong
