= Hmong in Wisconsin =

Ethnic group population

Total population
- 70,841 (2023)

Regions with significant populations
- Wausau, Sheboygan, Green Bay, Madison, Milwaukee, Oshkosh

Languages
- Hmong

Religion
- Miao folk religion, Buddhism, Shamanism, Christianity

Hmong Americans are the largest Asian ethnic group in the U.S. state of Wisconsin. Allies of the United States in Southeast Asia during the Vietnam War and later stages of the Laotian Civil War, they started seeking asylum as political refugees after the communist takeover in both nations in 1975, including the Hmong genocide in Laos. Hmong in Vietnam and Laos were subjected to targeted attacks in both countries, and tens of thousands were killed, imprisoned or forcibly relocated following the war.

== History ==
Hmong people first arrived in the upper Midwest in 1975 or 1976 following the United States withdrawal from the Vietnam War. They were seeking asylum in the United States, as many had worked or served in fighting for U.S. forces in Laos during the "secret war". By 1980, there were 408 Hmong people in the state. Originally only Hmong veterans were allowed to immigrate. The Hmong Institute, a nonprofit agency, recognized 2025 as the 50 year anniversary of the Hmong diaspora in Wisconsin.

Churches and social service agencies initially settled Southeast Asian refugees, most of them Hmong, along with some Vietnamese and Laotian people, in Wausau. According to the 1980 United States census, Wausau had fewer than 1% non-White people. There were several dozen Asian immigrants in 1978. By 1980, 200 Southeast Asian refugees had settled in Wausau. This increased to 400 in 1982 and 800 in 1984. Over time, the Hmong became the largest ethnic minority in the city. Doualy Xaykaothao of The Atlantic stated that ethnic tension between Hmong and native-born Americans in the state started in the 1980s and spilled over into the following decade.

In 1990, there were 16,980 Hmong in Wisconsin. This was an increase of more than 4,000% from the 1980 figure. By this time, the US government had relaxed some restrictions and allowed families to immigrate, leading to reunification of Hmong families in Wisconsin and other destinations. The first effort aided nuclear families, but Hmong extended families and clans are extremely important to their society, and they pressed also for extended family members to be allowed to immigrate. They have a patrilineal kinship system. By 1980, the Hmong quickly began to organize Mutual Assistance Associations in cities where they had the largest populations, and these have continued.

In 1991, there were 1,010 Hmong students in the Wausau School District. In a period ending in 1994, the tax rate of the Wausau School District rose by 10.48% because of the added expenses of services to children from immigrant families. The increase was three times as high as the increase in an adjacent school district that lacked a large immigrant population. By 1994, Wausau had 4,200 refugees. The number of Hmong students in the school district was over 2,000 in 1996. In 1998, this number reached its peak, 2,214. Wausau had some social upheaval from the Hmong arrival. Some schools in Wausau developed a minority of English speakers or were dominated by Hmong students. Some native-born American families in Wausau criticized crime associated with the Hmong community and the costs of social services to them.

In 2000, there were 46,600 Hmong in Wisconsin. By 2002, 12% of the Wausau population was Hmong, and 25% of the students at Wausau public schools were Hmong.

As of the 2010 U.S. census, there were 49,240 Hmong in the state. This was a 46% increase over the 2000 figures.

As of the 2023 American Community Survey one-year estimates, the Hmong population of Wisconsin had increased to 70,841.

=== State task force to aid 2004 immigration ===
In 2004, the U.S. agreed to allow immigration by an additional 15,000 Hmong in order to close the last refugee camp in Thailand. By 2006, a total of 3,254 of these individuals, representing 682 families, had been settled in Wisconsin. The governor of Wisconsin, Jim Doyle, appointed a Hmong Resettlement Task Force in 2004 to review social policies and make recommendations to aid the acculturation of Hmong in the state, particularly as some welfare and social service programs were changing as a result of federal law. The state had gained experience with dealing with Hmong immigrants since the 1980s immigration, and many studies supported changes to programs to increase effectiveness. The task force reported in 2005 to the governor with recommendations to support the 2004 immigration.

As a result of these recommendations, additional monies were budgeted for expansion of English as a Second Language (ESL) classes, and vocational skills training at community colleges, as well as for special classes to aid immigrants in adapting to Wisconsin. Local resettlement organizations worked to coordinate with the many Hmong Mutual Assistance Associations. Provisions were made for bilingual, bicultural aids and interpretation services to assist immigrants, and particularly the elderly, in using health and social services and managing interviews and encounters. Materials to gain a driver's license were translated into Hmong and posted on the department's website, and special programs were devised to help immigrants gain driver's licenses, to increase their readiness for work. In addition, employers were recruited for short-term programs to enhance immigrant entry into the job market.

Among measures to recognize Hmong contributions, in 2006, the Sheboygan Hmong Memorial was built in Sheboygan. It memorializes the Hmong veterans and civilians who fought with the United States in the Laotian Civil War.

== Geography ==
The majority of Wisconsin Hmong live in central city boundaries of Wisconsin communities, but some rural areas and small towns also have Hmong residents. Due to the post-Vietnam War resettlement policies of the federal government of the United States, the Hmong population was primarily concentrated in medium-sized and large-sized towns. In 2013 Mark Pfeifer, the editor of the Hmong Studies Journal, stated that Hmong in Milwaukee had recently been moving to the northwest side of Milwaukee; they historically lived in the north and south areas of Milwaukee.

As of 2010 the largest groups of Hmong in Wisconsin live in Greater Milwaukee, Appleton, Eau Claire, Green Bay, La Crosse, Madison, Sheboygan, and Wausau.

As of 2008, the numerically largest Hmong population is in Milwaukee County. In order, the following numerically largest groups are in the counties of La Crosse, Marathon (Wausau), Brown (Green Bay), and Eau Claire. The Hmong make up higher percentages of the population in Eau Claire, La Crosse, and Marathon counties than in the larger Milwaukee county. Jenna Christian, Pa Sia Low Moua, and Ingolf Vogeler, authors of The Cultural Landscape of the Hmong in Eau Claire, Wisconsin, wrote that "the Hmong stand out more singularly as an ethnic minority" in the other counties, which are less densely populated, "than they do in metropolitan areas like Milwaukee, which is already more racially and culturally diverse."

In 1998 Zaniewski and Rosen stated that the cities with the largest Hmong groups "are dispersed widely throughout the state". The communities that they identified as having significant Hmong populations included Appleton, Chippewa Falls, Eau Claire, Fond du Lac, Green Bay, La Crosse, Ladysmith, Madison, Manitowoc, Mauston, Menasha, Menomonie, Milwaukee, Neenah, Oshkosh, Sheboygan, Stevens Point, Superior, Tomah, Two Rivers, Wausau, and Wisconsin Rapids.

== Demographics ==
As of the 1990 U.S. census, 74% of Hmong households have an income below the federal poverty level. The average annual household income of the Hmong community was $13,518. As of 1998, the Hmong had the lowest socioeconomic status of all of the ethnic groups in Wisconsin.

As of the 1990 Census, 3% of Wisconsin Hmong are 65 years of age or older, and 55% of Hmong are younger than 15 years of age.

In December 1999 the Institute for Wisconsin's Future stated in a report, "Given the major cultural differences, language barriers and skill gaps facing the Hmong, a number of Wisconsin's Hmong population have relied on welfare to meet their families' basic needs during this transition." Vicky Selkowe, who served as the organization's project coordinator and the co-writer of the report, said that the language barrier was the main difficulty affecting the state's Hmong population. The immigrant generation's inexperience with the written language worsened their disadvantage in learning a new language.

As of the 2020 U.S. census, 62,331 people who identified as Hmong lived in Wisconsin. According to the 2010 U.S. census, there were 49,240 Hmong persons living in Wisconsin, making up 0.9% of the state's population. As of 2000, there were 33,791 Hmong persons in the state, making up 0.63% of the total state population and 32.9% of its Asian population. In 1990 the 16,373 Hmong persons in Wisconsin made up 0.33% of the state's population.

From 1990 to 2000, the Hmong population in Wisconsin increased by 106%, as immigration continued from Hmong refugee camps in Thailand. The state's White- American population increased in that time by 4.8%. Of the U.S. states, Wisconsin has the third-largest Hmong population, after California and Minnesota.

As of 2022, the largest Hmong populations in the state are located in Appleton (2,965), Eau Claire (2,868), Green Bay (2,822), La Crosse (1,435), Madison (1,985), Milwaukee (11,469), Oshkosh (2,165), Sheboygan (5,002), and Wausau (3,885).

== Commerce ==
According to the UW-Population Lab's analysis of 2020 census data, between 2017 and 2021, 38% of the Hmong population were employed in the manufacturing industry; 22% were employed in the census' industry category of "educational services, and healthcare and social assistance." As of the 1990 U.S. Census, 28% of Hmong are employed in professions or services related to professions. The Wisconsin statewide average in that sector was 23%.

As of 2013 many Hmong families have market gardens and attend farmers markets in Eau Claire, Green Bay, Sheboygan, La Crosse, Madison, Milwaukee, and Wausau. In the state relatively few Hmong work full-time in the agricultural sector.

As of 2003, 90-95% of adult Hmong in Wausau worked in low paying jobs which did not require fluency in English. All eligible members of the family held jobs in a typical Hmong household. In the city of Wausau, as of 2003, some Hmong owned small businesses, restaurants, and grocery stores.

As of 2019, The Hmong median household income in Wisconsin of $49,200 is closer to the state's median household income of $50,800.

== Media ==
As of 2003, in Wausau, there was relatively little Hmong-language media. Historically, the Hmong language was not written for a significant part of its history. In the Twin Cities of Minnesota, the radio station KFXN (690 AM) carries a Hmong language format, along with television station KJNK-LD3. In Sheboygan, the city's school district station, WSHS, has carried a locally-based Hmong program since 1983 from Vue Yang and the Hmong Mutual Assistance Association.

In 1994 Roy Beck wrote an article about Wausau's Hmong community for The Atlantic, stating that it would grow to the point where native-born Americans would be displaced. Beck credited the article for a book publishing deal and other benefits, and these benefits resulted in him establishing Numbers USA. In 2014 Robert Mentzer of the Wausau Daily Herald wrote a follow-up article on Beck's, criticizing it for having "racial anxiety" and stating that Beck's predictions did not come to fruition.

== Education ==
A Hmong-centered charter school is located in Milwaukee. Chris Her-Xiong established the Hmong American Peace Academy/International Peace Academy in 2004 as a K-12 school system there.

In 1981 there were 160 Hmong students in the Wausau School District (WSD). In the 1990s the Wausau School District received an increase of Hmong students, some of whom came from refugee camps and lacked formal education. In 1993 the Wausau School District began moving students, previously assigned to schools based on attendance zone, to a different scheme intended to equalize the ethnic proportions of Hmong and non-Hmong students. However it reverted to its previous scheme in 1994 after a negative reception from area parents. Patti Kraus, who worked as a secretary for the WSD, stated in 2016 that the ethnic Hmong successfully adapted to American school life.

As of the 1990 Census, of the Hmong older than 25, 47% had an education below the fifth-grade level.
