= International Peace Academy (Milwaukee) =

High school in Milwaukee, Wisconsin

The International Peace Academy is a high school in Milwaukee, Wisconsin, operating as a charter school, primarily for Hmong American students. It was started in 2008 when the ninth grade was established, and it added another grade each year, with twelfth grade scheduled to be added in the 2011–2012 school year.

The Hmong American Peace Academy is an affiliated charter elementary school.

== See also ==
- Hmong in Wisconsin
