= Hmong American Peace Academy =

The Hmong American Peace Academy (HAPA) is a charter school in Milwaukee, Wisconsin, under the authority of Milwaukee Public Schools. It includes the HAPA K-8 program, and it has an affiliated high school program. The National Center for Education Statistics classifies it as a full K-12 school.

Chris Her-Xiong, Jeff Nha Yia Yang, Gwaub Thao, Jay Chong Zeb Xiong, and Dr. Douglas Vue were the co-founders of the school in 2004. HAPA was established in 2004 for Hmong-American children and other children with southeast Asian heritage. Initially it enrolled students up to fifth grade, but later extended from pre-kindergarten to eighth grade. Enrollment is about 1000 students, of whom 98 percent speak a language other than English.

An affiliated school, the International Peace Academy, is a charter high school.

== Curriculum ==
The school provides its academic instruction in English, while it has its heritage classes in Hmong.

== Programs ==
The school has a Saturday academy for enrichment and extra support, an extended day program, after school tutoring.

== Demographics ==
As of 2013, 87% of students qualify for free or reduced lunch.

== See also ==
- Hmong in Wisconsin
- Language/culture-based charter school
