= Yaj =

Yaj can refer to:

- Luj Yaj, a singer from Thailand
- Yang (surname), spelled "Yaj" in Hmong
- Yaj Ceeb (or "Yaj" for short), a concept similar to yin and yang in Miao folk religion
- Yangere language, a language spoken in the Central African Republic, by ISO 639 code
- Yajiang County, a county in Garzê Tibetan Autonomous Prefecture, Sichuan province, China; see List of administrative divisions of Sichuan
