= Mai Na Lee =

Hmong American academic

- Maiv Nag Lis
- Born: 1970 or 1971 (age 55–56) (Note: Mai Na Lee was said to be 44 years old in 2015.); Pha Nok Kok, in the sub-district of Muang Pha, Xieng Khouang, Laos
- Other name: Mai Na M. Lee
- Occupations: Author, academic, researcher
- Years active: 1997–present

Academic background
- Education: Carleton College (BA); University of Wisconsin–Madison (MA & PhD)
- Thesis: The Dream of the Hmong Kingdom: Resistance, Collaboration, and Legitimacy Under French Colonialism (1893–1955) (2005)
- Doctoral advisor: Alfred W. McCoy

Academic work
- Discipline: Historian
- Sub-discipline: Postcolonialism
- Institutions: University of Minnesota–Twin Cities (2007–present)
- Main interests: Hmong diaspora

Mai Na Lee (also Mai Na M. Lee; c. 1971) is an associate professor of history and Asian American studies at the University of Minnesota–Twin Cities. She holds a PhD from the University of Wisconsin–Madison and is a researcher for the Hmong Studies Consortium. Lee is the first Hmong American to earn a doctorate in the field of history. Her book is Dreams of the Hmong Kingdom: The Quest for Legitimation in French Indochina, 1850–1960, which details the historical politics of Hmong in Laos.

== Early life and education ==
Born in Pha Nok Kok, in the sub-district of Muang Pha, Xieng Khouang, Laos, Lee crossed the Mekong River to Thailand with her family in 1979, and came to the United States as a Hmong refugee in 1980 around the age of 11. Her family was first resettled in Wisconsin, and later moved to the Twin Cities in Minnesota to be closer to relatives and resources tailored to Hmong people. She grew up in Saint Paul, Minnesota. She is a member of the Hmong Lee (also spelled Ly) clan.

As an undergraduate she decided to be a historian once realizing little Hmong history was recorded. In 1994 she graduated Carleton College as a Cowling Scholar with a major in East Asian History and a concentration in Women's Studies. She earned a master's degree in 2000 and a doctorate in history from University of Wisconsin–Madison in 2005. Lee is the first Hmong American to earn a doctorate in the field of history.

== Academic career ==
Lee is a tenured associate professor of history and Asian American studies at the University of Minnesota–Twin Cities. She is also the first female Hmong professor at the University of Minnesota. Fall semester of 2007 was when Lee began as an assistant professor. She was recommended for advancement from assistant to associate professor in 2015. Her courses on Hmong history were among the first to be taught at a university level.

Since 2010 Lee has been a researcher for Hmong Studies Consortium, a collaboration to study Hmong culture between University of Wisconsin–Madison, University of Minnesota–Twin Cities, and Chiang Mai University in Thailand. She is also an affiliated scholar with Center for Southeast Asian Studies at UW–Madison.

Lee's teaching and research focus on Hmong in Asia and Hmong Americans through a global and postcolonial lens.

Aline Lo in Lateral says that Mai Na Lee's work has steered the fields of Hmong American and Asian American scholarship away from "[making] Hmong people primitive objects to be classified and explained away." Erika Lee for Journal of Asian American Studies lists Mai Na Lee as part of the "first generation of Hmong American scholars". Lee was also "perhaps the first Hmong woman scholar to explore the role of Hmong women as indirect political and economic influencers" according to Kalia Vang.

Mai Na Lee's work challenges the "essentializing narrative" that equates Hmong Americans and Hmong history with the Secret War in Laos. In The Routledge Handbook of Refugee Narratives, Lo notes: "Lee also credits this narrow understanding of Hmong history to the success of Jane Hamilton's Tragic Mountains as it helped expose the Secret War to a wider public". Choua P. Xiong and Kaozong N. Mouavangsou write that early scholarship on Hmong people "has historically privileged colonial and imperial" perspectives and that "early [Hmong-perspective] scholars" such as Mai Na Lee have contributed to undoing the narrative that Hmong are "rebels, troublemakers, and national threats".

Lee has also criticized the motto "Hmong means free", arguing it "essentializes Hmong identity and echoes colonial attitudes". Although publishing a positive review of The Spirit Catches You and You Fall Down, she similarly critiques the book for "defining a culture by a history of persecution and a resistance to assimilation".

=== Dreams of the Hmong Kingdom ===
Lee's 2015 book is Dreams of the Hmong Kingdom: The Quest for Legitimation in French Indochina, 1850-1960 (ISBN 978-0-299-29884-5), based on her University of Wisconsin–Madison doctorate thesis "The Dream of the Hmong Kingdom: Resistance, Collaboration, and Legitimacy Under French Colonialism (1893–1955)" (ISBN 978-0-542-28276-8). Dreams of the Hmong Kingdom uses oral history and archival material to explain the history of Laotian Hmong leadership beginning in the mid-nineteenth century, focusing on Hmong politics and alternative leaders such as Vue Pa Chay. It argues Hmong leaders used different methods of asserting legitimacy to rule, including the "mandate of heaven", which Lee says is a Hmong political ideology borrowing from historical Han Chinese Confucian concepts. Under the mandate, the right to rule comes from heaven, and a Hmong leader who is able to establish a kingdom must have their power granted by heaven.

Dreams also records Hmong oral accounts of their migration to Laos in the 19th century. Additional Hmong historical figures covered in the book include Xiong Mi Chang, Pa Tsi, Blia Yao, French military officer Henri Roux, Ly Foung, and Touby Lyfoung.

For Asian Studies Review Hjorleifur Jonsson says that Lee's scholarship "raised the bar" for study on Southeast Asian highland areas. Alex Hopp for Hmong Studies Journal calls it a "seminal history of the Hmong under French rule". Lee used sources in multiple languages to "stellar effect" according to Christian C. Lentz. "Arguing that Hmong peoples never escaped from the state but rather continuously negotiate with it, historian Mai Na Lee represents the best of these debates and delivers original and lasting insights into highlands peoples often written about but still poorly understood. Her book’s fascinating analysis of Hmong politics and society significantly enriches scholarly understandings of the fraught relations between Hmong peoples, French colonial rule, and the Indochina Wars." Lentz's review for Journal of Vietnamese Studies concludes: "this remarkable history deserves a wide readership." Seb Rumsby finds Lee's dynamic between a messianic and state-backed political broker to be a "useful model". Jean Michaud says coverage of the few known records of Hmong leader Vue Pa Chay is academically rigorous. CHOICE recommends the book for graduate-level and faculty.

While they praised the book, Bradley C. Davis in Journal of Asian Studies found some of the language and translation into English "jarring" and Chia Youyee Vang notes that Lee "refrains from making critical statements about leaders from the Lee clan." "The book’s shortcomings are reflective of and situated within the challenge of doing Hmong oral history as a native researcher and a member of the Lee [Ly] clan" observed Nengher N. Vang for Hmong Studies Journal.

Christopher Goscha of Université du Québec à Montréal compares Dreams of the Hmong Kingdom to Jane Hamilton-Merritt's Tragic Mountains: The Hmong, the Americans, and the Secret Wars for Laos, 1942-1992 and recommends they "both be read side by side". While Tragic Mountains focuses on Vang Pao, his clan, and their role in the Vietnam War, Dreams of the Hmong Kingdom follows other families, such as the Lyfoung and the Lobliayao clans, and their roles during French rule.

== Works ==
=== Books ===
- Lee, Mai Na M (2015). Dreams of the Hmong Kingdom: The Quest for Legitimation in French Indochina, 1850-1960. New Perspectives in Southeast Asian Studies. Madison, Wisconsin: University of Wisconsin Press. ISBN 978-0-299-29884-5. OCLC 891941849. Project MUSE 40121. Dreams of the Hmong Kingdom: The Quest for Legitimation in French Indochina, 1850-1960 at Google Books

=== Chapters ===
- Lee, Mai Na M (December 7, 2021). "Hmong and Hmong Americans in Minnesota". MNopedia. Minnesota Historical Society.
- —— (1997). "The Thousand-Year Myth: Construction and Characterization of Hmong". Hmong Studies Journal. 2 (1). ProQuest 220359328.
- —— (2016). "The Women of "Dragon Capital": Marriage Alliances and the Rise of Vang Pao". In Vang, Chia Youyee; Nibbs, Faith G.; Vang, Ma (eds.). Claiming Place: On the Agency of Hmong Women. Minneapolis, Minnesota: University of Minnesota Press. ISBN 978-1-4529-5006-8. OCLC 944346999. Project MUSE 1763664.
- —— (2014). "Hmong of Minnesota and California". In Zhao, Xiaojian; Park, Edward J. W. (eds.). Asian Americans: An Encyclopedia of Social, Cultural, Economic, and Political History. Santa Barbara, California: Greenwood, an imprint of ABC-CLIO, LLC. ISBN 978-1-59884-240-1. OCLC 880408751. Asian Americans: An Encyclopedia of Social, Cultural, Economic, and Political History at Google Books
- —— (2014). "Hmong American Women". In Zhao, Xiaojian; Park, Edward J. W. (eds.). Asian Americans : an encyclopedia of social, cultural, economic, and political history. Santa Barbara, California: Greenwood, an imprint of ABC-CLIO, LLC. ISBN 978-1-59884-240-1. OCLC 880408751. Asian Americans: An Encyclopedia of Social, Cultural, Economic, and Political History at Google Books
- —— (2014). "Acknowledgements for the Hmong Across Borders Conference at the University of Minnesota, October 4–5, 2013". Hmong Studies Journal. 15 (2). ISSN 1091-1774. EBSCOhost 100432020 ProQuest 1645553650.

=== Reviews ===
- Lee, Mai Na M (2016). "Frontier Livelihoods: Hmong in the Sino-Vietnamese Borderlands, Book Review". Hmong Studies Journal. 17: 1–9. ISSN 1091-1774. EBSCOhost 120687498 ProQuest 1862642525.
- —— (June 2018). "THE NEW WAY: Protestantism and the Hmong in Vietnam - By Tâm T.T. Ngô". Pacific Affairs. 91 (2): 426–428. ProQuest 2113389953.
- —— (October 1, 2017). "Simon Creak. Embodied Nation: Sport, Masculinity, and the Making of Modern Laos". The American Historical Review. 122 (4): 1189–1191. doi:10.1093/ahr/122.4.1189. ISSN 0002-8762.
- —— (1998). "Book Review: The Spirit Catches You and You Fall Down". WWW Hmong Homepage. Craig D. Rice, St. Olaf College, USA. Archived from the original on January 14, 2007.

=== Theses ===
- Lee, Mai Na M (2005). The Dream of the Hmong Kingdom: Resistance, Collaboration, and Legitimacy Under French Colonialism (1893–1955) (Doctor of Philosophy (History) thesis). University of Wisconsin - Madison. ISBN 978-0-542-28276-8. ProQuest 305378658 UMI Microform 3186214. The Dream of the Hmong Kingdom: Resistance, Collaboration, and Legitimacy Under French Colonialism (1893–1955) at Google Books
- ———— (2000). Making the Paramount Chief: Transformation of the Hmong Clan Leadership Structure Under French Colonial Rule (1893–1960) (Master of Arts thesis). University of Wisconsin–Madison. hdl:2027/wu.89069717833. OCLC 609056434. Making the Paramount Chief: Transformation of the Hmong Clan Leadership Structure Under French Colonial Rule (1893–1960) at Google Books

=== Presentations ===
- Mai Na Lee, H. Jonsson, F. Nibbs, J. R. Hickman & Yonglin Jiang (2011), ‘To Zomia or Not to Zomia? Critical Ethnographic and Historical Perspectives’, Hmong in Comparative Contexts Conference, organized by the Hmong Studies Consortium, University of Wisconsin-Madison/ University of Minnesota, 4 March 2011.
- ——— (January 8, 2009). A Culture in Peril: Hmong Grave Desecration in Thailand (mp3). UThink: Blogs at the University Libraries (lecture). Headliners. University of Minnesota. Archived from the original (mp3) on June 26, 2009. University of Minnesota College of Continuing Education Headliners lectures
- Lee, Mai Na M (March 30, 2023). The Making of Pa Chay Company and the Hmong Communist Revolution (lecture). Madison, Wisconsin: Southeast Asian Studies, University of Wisconsin–Madison.
- Lee, Mai Na (May 4, 2018). The Origin and Creation of Hmong-American Memories of Blood Sacrifice on Behalf of the United States During the Secret War (lecture). Hmong Studies Consortium, Center for Southeast Asian Studies, University of Wisconsin–Madison.
- ——— (January 5, 2025). Pioneers of the Highlands: Touby, Tougeu, and Toulia Lyfoung. American Historical Association 138th Annual Meeting. New York City, New York.
- ——— (April 29, 2026). Subverting the Blood Sacrifice Narrative: How the Hmong Arrived in the Midwest and Became Targets of ICE Arrest and Deportation (lecture). Decorah, Iowa: Luther College.
- ——— (November 14, 2022). Hmong Veterans of the Secret War and Their Fight for Recognition in America (lecture). Chapel Hill, North Carolina: University of North Carolina at Chapel Hill.

=== Appearances ===
- Lisa Blackstone (2017). America's Secret War: Minnesota Remembers Vietnam (documentary). Saint Paul, Minnesota: Public Broadcasting Service (PBS). OCLC 1035568347 – via WETA.
- Babana-Hampton, Safoi; Pillai, Swarnavel Eswaran; Payen, Cyril; Lee, Cedric Naolu; Lee, Liachoua Naolu; Lee, Sylvie (2015), Hmong memory at the crossroads, East Lansing, Michigan: Humanities Without Walls Consortium, Michigan State University, OCLC 953453836
