= Vue Pa Chay's revolt =

Hmong revolt against taxation in French Indochina (1918–1921)

Vue Pa Chay's Revolt
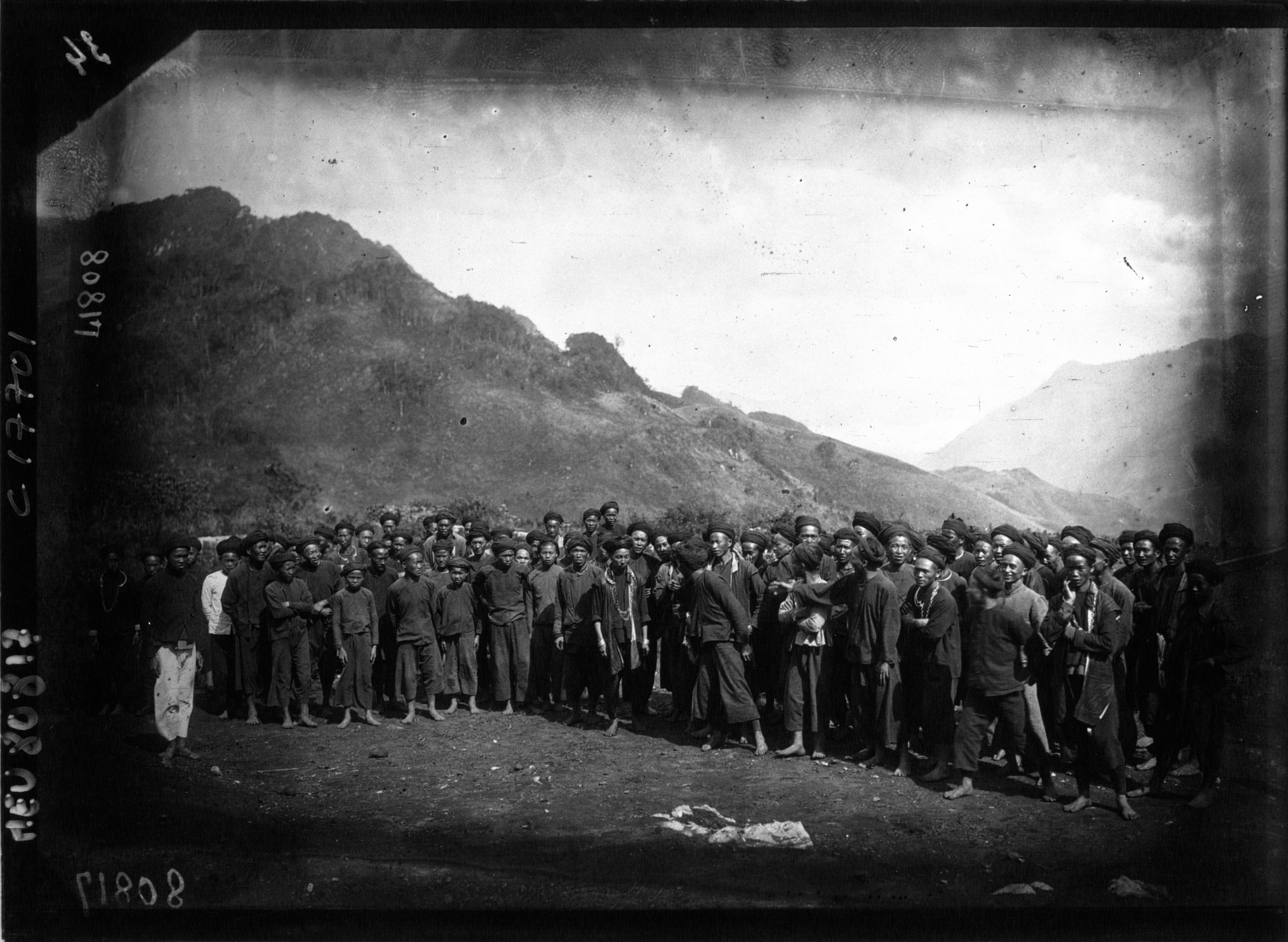
- Group of miao men discussing a case.
| Date | 1918–1921 |
| Location | Territories of today's Laos and Vietnam (Tonkin) |

Belligerents
| France: French protectorate of Laos; French protectorate of Tonkin | Vue Pa Chay's Hmong Army |

Commanders and leaders
| | Vue Pa Chay; Kao Mee |

Vue Pa Chay's revolt, also called War of the Insane or the Madman's War (Guerre du Fou) by French sources, was a Hmong revolt led by Vue Pa Chay from 1918 to 1921, against French colonial taxation in Indochina.

== Background ==
The stimulus for the rebellion was heavy taxation by the French and abuse of power by the ethnic Lao and Tai tax collectors. Hmong farmers were angry when officials "mistakenly" collected taxes several times in the same year, stole cattle, requisitioned horses, and seized the entire poppy harvest. Meanwhile, France adopted the strategy of recognizing and relying on local leaders, incorporating Hmong chiefs into the colonial administrative system. Thus, the Hmong people divided themselves into pro-French and anti-French factions. Vue Pa Chay used his influence and the reputation of his miraculous powers to convince his followers that he could deliver his people from French domination, restoring the ancient Hmong kingdom.

=== Hmong ===
The Hmong in the Tonkin–Laos borderlands were relatively recent migrants from neighbouring Chinese provinces such as Yunnan, Guizhou and Sichuan, having moved southward both in response to Chinese expansion and in search of new land for their shifting cultivation. They traditionally occupied upland areas between roughly 800 and 2,000 metres above sea level, settling the ridges and mountain slopes because the fertile lowlands and mid-altitudes were already dominated by Tai groups and other irrigated rice cultivators.

Their communities were scattered across remote districts — including parts of present-day Phôngsali, Luang Prabang, Sam Neua and Xiang Khouang in Laos, as well as adjacent highland districts in Tonkin — and numbered only in the low tens of thousands in the region. The mountainous environment was steep, forested, and poorly mapped, with few roads or means of communication. This landscape limited the reach of outside authorities and allowed Hmong society to preserve its own institutions, including shamanic practices and distinct customary law.

Economically, most Hmong households practised slash-and-burn cultivation and small-scale hill farming, supplemented by timber cutting and the cultivation of market crops such as opium. Forest products and opium were important commodities during the French colonial era and became targets of taxation and control by local tax collectors and colonial agents. The combination of marginal land, dependence on upland cash crops, and heavy or abusive tax extraction by lowland intermediaries contributed to grievances that underlay the 1918–1921 revolt.

== Revolt ==
=== Rebel actions ===
In mid‑1918, Hmong groups clashed with local Lao–Thai officials who enforced colonial taxes. In October, roughly 300 Hmong under Vue Pa Chay raided villages near Điện Biên Phủ, burning hamlets and killing local chiefs. On 5 December 1918 a French outpost was ambushed, marking the clear turn from a local rebellion into an open insurgency against the French authorities.

Over 1919, the rebellion spread over large areas of the Tonkin–Laos borderlands. French reports noted that the Hmong revolt was general across roughly 40,000 km² of territory. Hmong bands, led by sorcerers and village chiefs under Vue Pa Chay’s inspiration, waged guerrilla warfare on multiple fronts. They ambushed French posts and supply convoys, cut telegraph lines, and attacked frontier settlements, including Lao villages and outposts. Some accounts describe Hmong chiefs issuing orders "fallen from the sky" that urged all Hmong to "push the war to the utmost against the Laotians and the French".

Religious belief and sorcery provided the rebels with strong morale. Vue Pa Chay was revered as a powerful sorcerer, who regularly climbed trees to receive military orders from heaven. Rebel agents circulated white cloth amulets inscribed with mystic symbols which were said to protect against gunfire. Legend also told of a Hmong nun called Pa Kiao who would sit on a banana leaf to transform beans into soldiers. Such magical beliefs, along with Hmong knowledge of the terrain, helped many fighters elude capture and gave the French the impression that the Hmong felt divinely protected.

=== Fall ===
Early 1920 saw the revolt begin to collapse. Not all Hmong remained with Vue Pa Chay: many village leaders either stayed loyal to the French or switched sides, and French columns, often guided by friendly Hmong, started recovering control. Many rebel units were intercepted or raided, and several chief insurgents were arrested. By spring 1920, the surviving Hmong rebels were effectively disarmed: they resumed paying the colonial taxes, even adding large tribute payments of 12,000–15,000 piastres as "reparations" to the French. In early 1921, the revolt was effectively ended. Vue Pa Chay fled into the jungle with just a few followers. By March 1921, French officials announced the "collective submission" of the last rebel groups. The highland regions of Tonkin and Laos were declared fully pacified. The photograph of Vue Pa Chay's severed head was publicized by the French government to the Hmong.

== Aftermath ==
The rebellion ultimately failed to dislodge French rule, but it did force a significant change in governance. After the uprising, the French stripped the Lao and Thai chiefs of their tax-collecting powers over Hmong villages – a key rebel objective. However, the colonial response was to impose strict new controls. The French explicitly warned that any future uprising would be crushed "with the utmost severity", and they forced the formerly semi-nomadic Hmong into permanent villages as part of a sedentarization policy. Traditional Hmong institutions were marginalized: religious leaders were excluded from power, local customary laws were replaced by French legal codes, and the entire society was brought under tighter colonial administration. In effect, the revolt's failure led to the loss of Hmong autonomy – even as it removed the immediate abuses of the old Lao–Thai tax system.

== See also ==
- Holy Man's Rebellion
