= Noah Lor =

American politician

Noah Lor is an American politician in Merced, California, United States. He is the first Hmong American to be elected as mayor pro-tempore in the City of Merced history.

Lor was elected to the Merced City Council in 2007 and re-elected again second term in 2011. He was elected to be Mayor Pro-Tempore in December 5, 2011. The City of Merced does not have a directly elected mayor pro-tempore. The mayor pro-tempore is, traditionally, appointed by the council, and, in many cases, the council member in the most recent election who gets the highest number of votes is appointed by the city council to serve for two years as mayor pro-tempore.
