= Hang Sao =

Hang Sao (Haam Choj, a given Mong name; 1939–2004) was a prominent figure in the Laotian Civil War. He was raised in the city of Pah Leong, Xieng Khoua.

== Career ==
Hang Sao served in the Royal Lao Army from 1961 to 1975. In 1969, he was appointed to the post of Lieutenant Colonel by General Oun Latikun and Prime Minister Souvanhna. He also served as an advisor to General Vang Pao during the conflict.

Hang Sao and his family emigrated from Laos to France in 1976, and then to the United States: first to Seattle, Washington in 1978, and finally to Detroit, Michigan in 1984. In 1982, Hang Sao was appointed as Deputy Minister of Interior by the Royal Lao Government in Exile and in 1992, he was appointed as an advisor to the King of Laos in-exile, LangXang Houng Kau. Hang Sao earned his Bachelor of Arts in political science in 1995, and was elected to ten Hmong churches.

He was active in the Hmong American community until his death in 2004.
