= Joe Bee Xiong =

Hmong American politician and activist

Eau Claire City Council Member
- In office 1996–2000

Member of the Wisconsin Juvenile Justice Commission
- In office 2003–2006
- Governor: Jim Doyle

Personal details
- Born: August 10, 1961 Muong Cha, Xiengkhoung Province, Kingdom of Laos
- Died: March 31, 2007 (aged 45) Laos
- Party: Democratic
- Spouse: Ta Moua Xiong
- Education: Mount Senario College; Cardinal Stritch University

Joua Bee Xiong (RPA: Nstuab Npis Xyooj; August 10, 1961 – March 31, 2007), better known as Joe Bee Xiong, was a Hmong American politician and activist who served as a member of the Eau Claire City Council. Xiong was the first Hmong person in United States history to be elected to municipal government and a well-known advocate for Hmong culture and causes.

== Early life and career ==
Xiong was born in Muong Cha, a Hmong village in northern Laos in 1961. Xiong's father was a soldier for the CIA-supported Hmong leader Vang Pao. Xiong became a child soldier for Americans in Laos during the Vietnam War from ages 12–14. In the late 1970s, Xiong traveled with his family to a refugee camp in Thailand. He immigrated to the United States in 1979 and came to Eau Claire in 1980. Upon his arrival to Eau Claire, Xiong could not speak any English. Xiong graduated from Eau Claire Memorial High School at the age of 21 and went on to gain a certificate in computer science from the Chippewa Valley Technical College. Xiong graduated from Mount Senario College with a bachelor's degree in criminal justice and later received his master's degree in business management from Cardinal Stritch University.

Xiong's professional career began working for the city of Eau Claire as a reserve police officer and as a social worker for Eau Claire County. Xiong served two terms on the Eau Claire City Council, where he focused on community partnerships. In 2004, he ran to represent the 68th Assembly District in the Wisconsin State Assembly against Incumbent Terry Moulton. He received 14,093 votes and Moulton received 16,662 votes. Xiong worked closely with Congressman Ron Kind to investigate human rights abuses in Laos and Southeast Asia.

== Personal life and death ==
Xiong lived in Eau Claire with his wife and had two sons and six daughters. In addition to his civic activism and public service, Xiong was a well-known folk artist in the Hmong community. Xiong was a Qeej Master, learning to play two years after the end of the Vietnam War. Xiong played for traditional funerals and ceremonies. As well as the qeej, Xiong played several other instruments including reedless end-blown flutes, side-blown flutes with copper reeds, and the jaw harp. Xiong performed with these instruments at new world Hmong seasonal competitions and at cultural events, including the 1998 Smithsonian Folklife Festival.

Xiong died on March 31, 2007, due to heart complications while visiting his home country of Laos. Thousands of people mourned Xiong's death during his three-day-long traditional Hmong funeral.

== Legacy ==
Xiong was a subject of a PBS Documentary about his life and public service. In April 2007, the Wisconsin Legislature passed a joint resolution commemorating the life of public service of Joe Bee Xiong. The City of Eau Claire renamed the street which Xiong lived on to be "Xiong Boulevard".
