= Kao Ly Ilean Her =

Hmong American attorney and activist

University of Minnesota Board of Regents
- In office 2019–2021

Executive Director of the Council on Asian Pacific Minnesotans
- In office 1997–2012

Personal details
- Born: March 13, 1969 Xaisomboun province, Laos
- Died: May 13, 2021 (aged 52) Minnesota, United States
- Cause of death: COVID-19
- Parent(s): Bee Yang Her (mother), Chad Vua Her (father)
- Relatives: 4 siblings
- Education: Hamline University (BA); University of Minnesota Law School (JD)

Kao Ly Ilean Her (RPA: Nkauj Hli Hawj; March 13, 1969 – May 13, 2021) was an American attorney, activist, and prominent leader in the Hmong American community in Minnesota. She was the first Hmong person elected to the University of Minnesota Board of Regents, serving from 2019 until her death in 2021. From 1997 to 2012, she was the executive director of the state agency Council on Asian Pacific Minnesotans (CAPM), where she advocated for Asian Pacific Islander communities across the state.

Her was a pioneering figure in the Hmong community of the Minneapolis–Saint Paul area. She was the first Hmong woman admitted to the Minnesota State Bar Association and was deeply involved in community development and advocacy. She helped establish several nonprofits and led the Hmong Elders Center.

== Early life ==
Her was born in 1969 on Long Cheng military base in Laos, to Bee Yang Her and Chad Vua Her. Long Cheng was a secret military base supported by the United States during the Laotian Civil War, and at the time was one of the most populous settlements in Laos as well as the largest Hmong community in the world. Her father, Chad Vua Her, was a community leader and former school superintendent. Due to his affiliation with U.S. forces during the Secret War, the family was forced to flee Laos, eventually resettling in the United States. They first arrived in Clinton, Iowa, in 1976, and later moved to Saint Paul, Minnesota, in 1986.

== Career ==
Kao Ly Ilean Her graduated from Hamline University in 1991 with a bachelor's degree in political science and earned her J.D. from the University of Minnesota Law School in 1994. She became the first Hmong woman admitted to the Minnesota State Bar Association.

From 1997 to 2012, Her served as executive director of the Council on Asian Pacific Minnesotans (CAPM), a state government agency advocating on behalf of Asian American communities in Minnesota.

Her led a number of nonprofit initiatives focused on empowering Asian Americans in Minnesota. She co-founded Hnub Tshiab: Hmong Women Achieving Together, an organization dedicated to fostering leadership among young Hmong women and addressing gender-based discrimination and violence. She also co-founded Allies for Mentoring Asian Youth, the Heritage Center for Asian Americans and Pacific Islanders, and the Dragon Boat Festival on Lake Phalen.

Her served on boards or as a trustee for numerous organizations, including the Minneapolis Foundation, the Asian Pacific Endowment of the Saint Paul & Minnesota Foundation, the Women's Foundation of Minnesota, United Hospital, and the Minneapolis YWCA. She also operated the Hmong Elders Center, an adult day care in Saint Paul, where she helped connect elders to the broader community through traditional arts such as sewing and bamboo basket weaving.

In 2019, Her was elected to an at-large seat on the University of Minnesota Board of Regents, becoming the first Hmong woman to serve on the board. Upon her election, she described her leadership as "value-based" and outlined her three core priorities as "affordability, accessibility, and an equitable, quality education."

== Personal life and death ==
Her was the eldest of five siblings. She was a passionate advocate for the arts, particularly pan-Asian cultural initiatives such as the Dragon Festival held at Lake Phalen.

Her died on May 13, 2021, after contracting the coronavirus. She was considered high-risk due to a chronic lung condition. A memorial scholarship fund was established in her name through Hnub Tshiab.

University of Minnesota President Joan Gabel issued a statement following Her's death, saying: "I am heartbroken to learn about Ilean’s passing. She was such a strong advocate for the University of Minnesota and for all members of our university community. [...] Her service to the entire state of Minnesota, and in particular to Minnesota’s Hmong and Asian American Pacific Islander communities, is well known and celebrated."
