= Mark Pfeifer =

Editor of Hmong Studies Journal

Mark Edward Pfeifer is the editor of the Hmong Studies Journal, and the director of the Hmong Resource Center Library and the Museum at the Hmong Cultural Center in St. Paul, Minnesota.

From 2000 to 2006, he directed the Hmong Resource Center Library at the Hmong Cultural Center (HCC) in St. Paul. From around 2006 to 2011 Pfeifer worked at the Texas A&M University–Corpus Christi as an academic librarian. During that period he assisted HCC with its website.

Since 2010, he has taught anthropology courses online for the State University of New York Polytechnic Institute in Utica, New York and for Empire State College in Saratoga Springs, New York since 2013.

== Works ==
- Annotated Bibliography of Hmong-related Works, 2007-2019. Hmong Resources Publisher, 2020. ISBN 9781644100219.
- Hmong-related Works, 1996-2006: An Annotated Bibliography. Scarecrow Press, 2007. ISBN 9780810860162.
- Tapp, Nicholas and Mark Edward Pfeifer (editors). A Hmao Songs, Stories and Legends from China. Lincom, 2009. ISBN 978-3929075700.
- Pfeifer, Mark Edward; Chiu, Monica; Yang, Kou (editors). Diversity in Diaspora: Hmong Americans in the Twenty-First Century. University of Hawaiʻi Press, January 2013. ISBN 978-0-8248-3597-2. Pfeifer was the lead editor of the book, an anthology of scholarly articles on Hmong Americans.
