= Cy Thao =

American politician (born 1972)

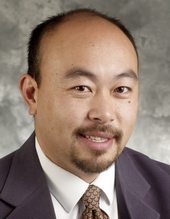

Member of the Minnesota House of Representatives from the 65A district
- In office 2003–2011
- Preceded by: Andy Dawkins
- Succeeded by: Rena Moran

Personal details
- Born: March 2, 1972 (age 54) Laos
- Party: Democratic
- Spouse: Lee Vang
- Children: 2
- Education: University of Minnesota, Morris

Cy Thao (born March 2, 1972) is a Laotian-born Hmong American politician who served as a member of the Minnesota House of Representatives from 2003 to 2011.

== Early life and education ==
In 1975, Thao's family fled from Communists in Laos and lived in a refugee camp in Thailand until moving to the United States in 1980. Shortly thereafter, he joined the Boy Scouts of America and attained the rank of Eagle Scout. He credits Scouting with helping him blend into American society and teaching him the values of community obligation. He was a member of Troop 100 in Minneapolis, Minnesota.

Thao is a graduate of the University of Minnesota Morris (UMM).

== Career ==
A Democrat, Thao was first elected in 2002. He did not seek re-election in 2010, and left office on January 3, 2011. Thao represented District 65A, which includes portions of Saint Paul.

He is currently a teacher and artist, whose work "The Hmong Migration" has been displayed at the Minneapolis Institute of Art.

== See also ==
- History of the Hmong in Minneapolis–Saint Paul
