= Hmong Americans =

Americans of Hmong birth or descent

Hmong Americans 𖬌𖬣𖬵 𖬉𖬲𖬦 𖬗𖬲 / Hmoob Mes Kas

Total population
- 363,565 (2023); 0.11% of the U.S. population (2022)

Regions with significant populations
- California (Fresno, Sacramento, Stockton, Merced), Oklahoma (Tulsa), Wisconsin (Wausau, Sheboygan, Green Bay, Fox Cities, Madison, Milwaukee), Minnesota (Minneapolis–St. Paul), North Carolina (Charlotte, Raleigh, Hickory), New York (New York City), Alaska (Anchorage), Iowa

Languages
- Hmong, American English, some Mandarin, some Lao, some Thai, some Vietnamese

Religion
- Miao folk religion, Buddhism, Shamanism, Christianity

Related ethnic groups
- Iu Mien Americans, Laotian Americans

Hmong Americans (RPA: Hmoob Mes Kas, Pahawh Hmong: 𖬌𖬣𖬵 𖬉𖬲𖬦 𖬗𖬲) are Americans of Hmong ancestry. Many Hmong Americans immigrated to the United States as refugees in the late 1970s, with a second wave in the 1980s and 1990s. Over half of the Hmong population from Laos left the country, or attempted to leave, in 1975, at the culmination of the Laotian Civil War.

During this period, thousands of Hmong were evacuated or escaped on their own to Hmong refugee camps in neighboring Thailand. About 90% of those who made it to refugee camps in Thailand were ultimately resettled in the United States. The rest, about 8 to 10%, resettled in countries including Canada, France, the Netherlands, and Australia.

According to the 2021 American Community Survey conducted by the US Census Bureau, the population count for Hmong Americans was 368,609. As of 2019, the largest community in the United States was in the Minneapolis–St. Paul metropolitan area. Hmong Americans face disparities in healthcare and socioeconomic challenges that lead to lower health literacy, median life expectancy, and per-capita income.

== History ==
=== 1976 and 1980s ===
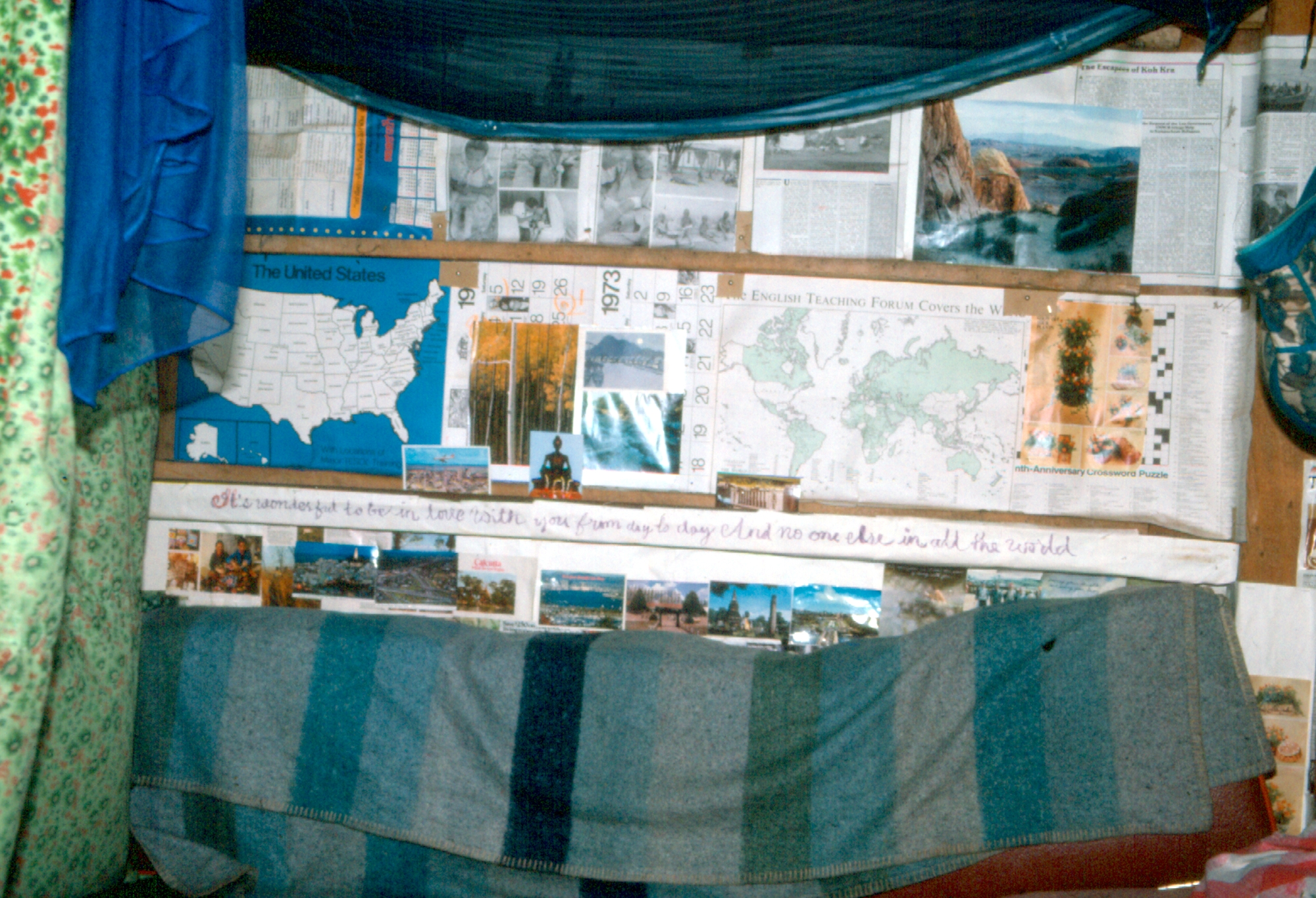
Ephemera in a classroom at Ban Vinai Refugee Camp, Thailand, c. 1985

Initially, only 1,000 Hmong people were evacuated to the US. In May 1976, another 11,000 Hmong were allowed to enter the United States. By 1978, some 30,000 Hmong had immigrated to the US, and by 1998, there were 200,000 Hmong living in the US. This first wave was made up primarily of men directly associated with General Vang Pao's Secret Army, which had been aligned with US war efforts during the Vietnam War. Vang Pao's Secret Army, which was subsidized by the US Central Intelligence Agency, fought mostly along the Ho Chi Minh Trail, where his forces sought to disrupt North Vietnamese weapons supply efforts to the communist Viet Cong rebel forces in South Vietnam. Ethnic Laotian and Hmong veterans, and their families, led by Colonel Wangyee Vang formed the Lao Veterans of America in the aftermath of the war to help refugees in the camps in Thailand and to help former veterans and their families in the United States, especially with family reunification and resettlement issues.

The passage of the Refugee Act of 1980 represented the second-wave of Hmong immigration. The clans, from which the Hmong take their surnames, are: Chang (Tsaab) or Cha (Tsab), Chao (Tsom), Cheng (Tsheej), Chue (Tswb), Fang (Faaj) or Fa (Faj), Hang (Haam) or Ha (Ham), Her (Hawj), Khang (Khaab) or Kha (Khab), Kong (Koo) or Soung (Xoom), Kue (Kwm), Lee (Lis), Lor (Lauj), Moua (Muas), Pha (Phab), Thao (Thoj), Vang (Vaaj) or Va (Vaj), Vue or Vu (Vwj), Xiong (Xyooj) and Yang (Yaaj) or Ya (Yaj).

=== 1990s and 2000s ===
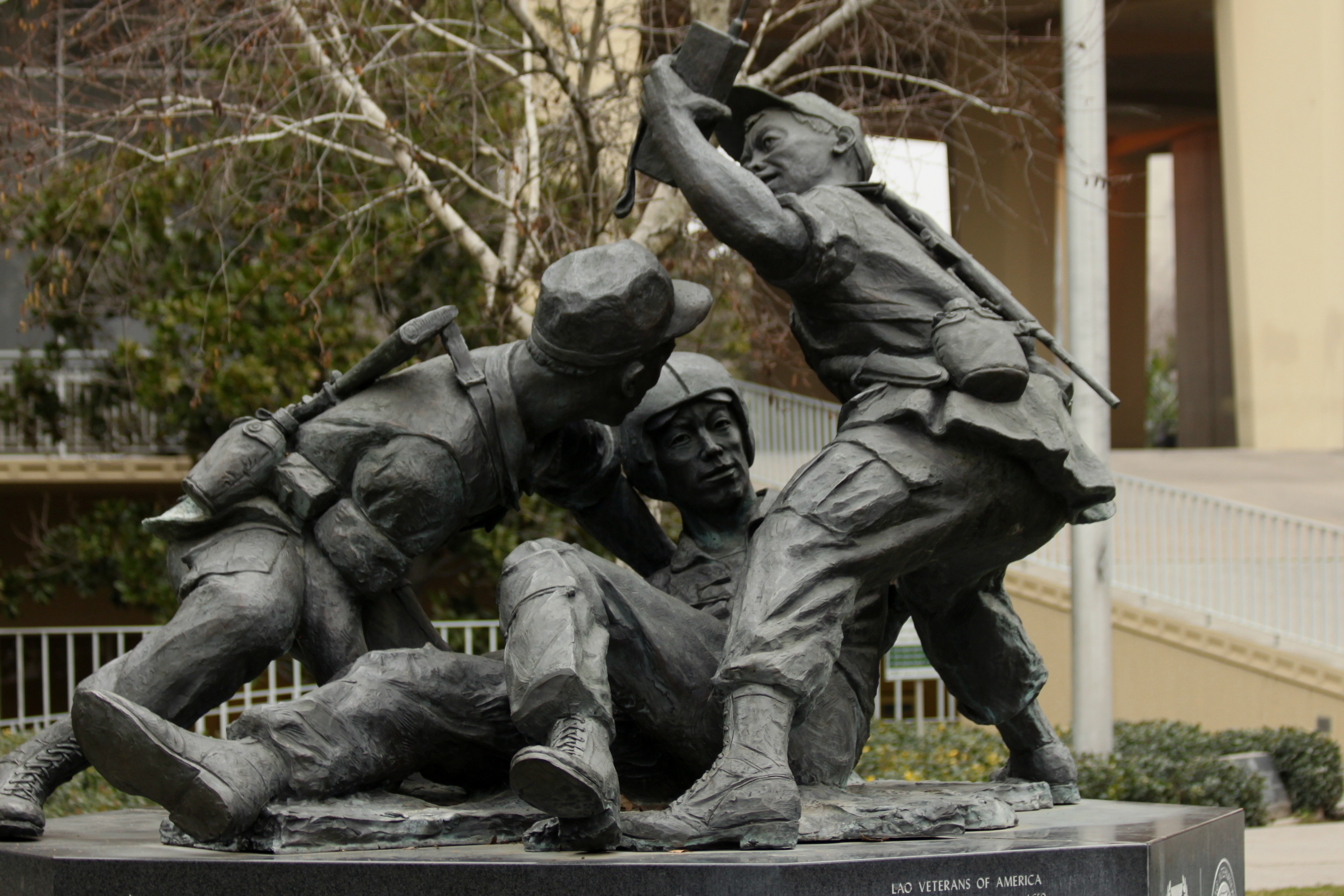
A memorial erected 2005 in front of Fresno County Court House commemorating Hmong service

Following the 1980 immigration wave, a heated global political debate developed over how to deal with the remaining Hmong refugees in Thailand. Many had been held in squalid Thai refugee camps, and the United Nations and the Clinton administration sought to repatriate them to Laos.

Reports of human rights violations against the Hmong in Laos, including killings and imprisonments, led most Thailand-based Hmong to oppose returning there, even as conditions worsened in the camps in Thailand due to insufficient funding.

One of the more prominent examples of apparent Laotian abuse of the Hmong was the fate of Vue Mai, a former soldier. The US Embassy in Bangkok recruited him to return to Laos under the repatriation program, in their effort to reassure the Thai-based Hmong that their safety in Laos would be assured. But Vue disappeared in Vientiane. The US Commission for Refugees later reported that he was arrested by Lao security forces and never seen again.

Especially following the Vue Mai incident, the Clinton and UN policy of returning the Hmong to Laos began to meet with strong political opposition by US conservatives and some human rights advocates. Michael Johns, a former White House aide to George H. W. Bush and a Heritage Foundation foreign policy analyst, along with other influential conservatives, led a campaign to grant the Thai-based Hmong immediate US immigration rights. In an October 1995 National Review article, citing the Hmong's contributions to US war efforts during the Vietnam War, Johns described Clinton's support for returning the Thai-based Hmong refugees to Laos as a "betrayal" and urged Congressional Republicans to step up opposition to the repatriation. Opposition to the repatriation grew in Congress and among Hmong families in the US. Congressional Republicans responded by introducing and passing legislation to appropriate sufficient funds to resettle all remaining Hmong in Thailand in the United States. Clinton vowed to veto the legislation.

In addition to internal US opposition to the repatriation, the government of Laos expressed reservations about the repatriation, stating that the Hmong remaining in Thailand were a threat to its one-party communist government and the Marxist government in Vientiane, Laos. In a significant and unforeseen political victory for the Hmong and their US Republican advocates, tens of thousands of Thai-based Hmong refugees were ultimately granted US immigration rights. The majority were resettled in California, Minnesota, and Wisconsin. The defeat of the repatriation initiative resulted in the reunifications in the US of many long-separated Hmong families. In 2006, as a reflection of the growth of the minority in the state, the Wisconsin State Elections Board translated state voting documents into the Hmong language.

Throughout the Vietnam War, and for two decades following it, the US government stated that there was no "Secret War" in Laos and that the US was not engaged in air or ground combat operations in Laos. In the late 1990s, however, several US conservatives, led by Johns and others, alleged that the Clinton administration was using the denial of this covert war to justify a repatriation of Thailand-based Hmong war veterans to Laos. It persuaded the US government to acknowledge the Secret War (conducted mostly under President Richard Nixon) and to honor the Hmong and American veterans from the war.

On May 15, 1997, in a total reversal of US policy, the federal government acknowledged that it had supported a prolonged air and ground campaign in Laos against the North Vietnamese Army and Vietcong. That day it dedicated the Laos Memorial on the grounds of Arlington National Cemetery in honor of the Hmong and other combat veterans from the Secret War. In 1999 there were about 250,000 Hmong people living in the United States, living in numerous medium and large cities.

Some Hmong remained in refugee camps in Thailand at the time of the September 11, 2001, attacks. This resulted in the tightening of US immigration laws, especially under the Patriot Act and the Real ID Act, and the immigration of Hmong refugees to the US has significantly slowed. Most Hmong refugees in Thailand had been engaged in documented armed conflict (although under US sponsorship) during and after the Vietnam War. The anti-terrorism legislation created barriers to such people being accepted as immigrants.

== Demographics ==
=== Hmong population in the US by areas of concentration ===
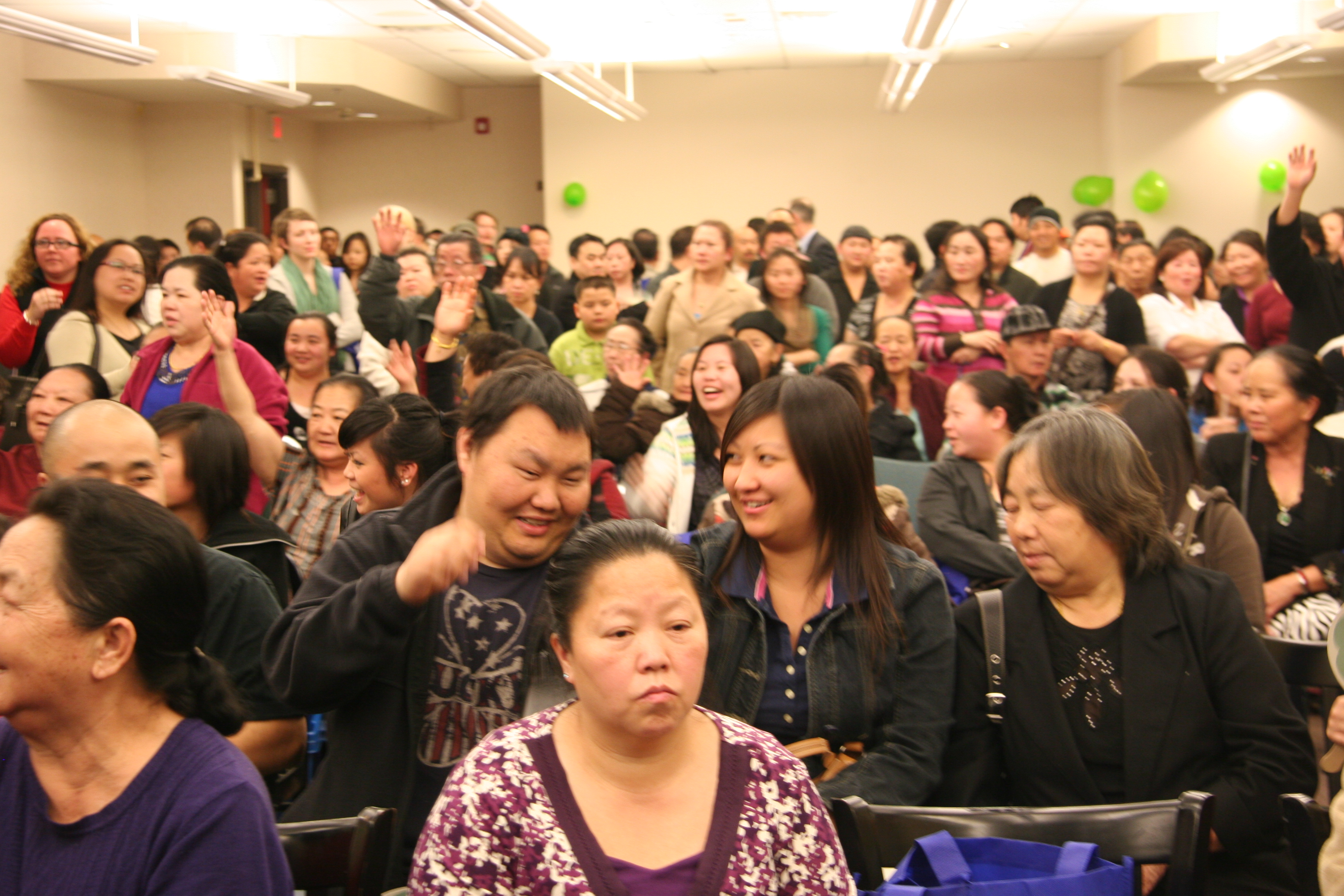
Hmong Americans at a community recycling event in Saint Paul

According to the 2010 US Census, 260,073 people of Hmong descent reside in the United States. This is an increase from 186,310 in 2000. The vast majority of growth since 2000 was from natural increase, except for the admission of a final group of over 15,000 refugees in 2004 and 2005 from Wat Tham Krabok in Thailand. Of the 260,073 Hmong Americans, 247,595 or 95.2% are fully Hmong, and the remaining 12,478 are part Hmong. The Hmong American population is among the youngest of all demographics in the United States. The majority of the population was born after 1980, and most mixed Hmong Americans are under 10 years old.

States with the largest Hmong population include: California (86,989; 0.2%), Minnesota (63,619; 1.2%), Wisconsin (47,127; 0.8%), and North Carolina (10,433; 0.1%), Michigan (5,924; 0.1%), Colorado (4,530; 0.1%), Georgia (3,623; 0.03%), Alaska (3,534; 0.5%), Oklahoma (3,369; 0.1%), and Oregon (2,920; 0.1%). The metropolitan areas of Fresno and Minneapolis-St. Paul have especially large Hmong communities. Saint Paul, Minnesota, has the largest Hmong population per capita in the United States (10.0%; 28,591 Hmong Americans), followed by Wausau in Wisconsin (3,569; 9.1% of its population). The Hmong communities of Minnesota and Wisconsin are geographically and culturally interlinked, with sizeable Hmong communities present in most of the mid-size cities between Milwaukee and Minneapolis.

In terms of metropolitan area, the largest Hmong-American community is in Minneapolis-Saint Paul-Bloomington, MN Metro Area (74,422); followed by Fresno, CA Metro Area (31,771); Sacramento, CA Metro Area (26,996); Milwaukee, WI Metro Area (11,904); and Merced, CA Metro Area (7,254).

There are smaller Hmong communities scattered across the country, including cities in California; Colorado (Denver, Colorado – 4,264); Michigan (Detroit, Michigan and Warren, Michigan – 4,190), Alaska (Anchorage, Alaska – 3,494); North Carolina (Hickory, North Carolina); Georgia (Auburn, Duluth, Lawrenceville, Monroe, Atlanta, and Winder); Wisconsin (Eau Claire, Appleton, Green Bay, La Crosse, Madison, and Stevens Point, Plover, and Sheboygan); Kansas (Kansas City – 1,754); Oklahoma (Tulsa – 2,483); Southwest Missouri; Northwest Arkansas (Benton County); Washington; Oregon (Portland), Montana (Missoula) and throughout the United States.

=== Hmong by location ===
As of 2024, the metropolitan areas with the most Hmong Americans are as follows:

City	Hmong Population	Hmong Percentage
Minneapolis-St. Paul-Bloomington, MN-WI	101,405	2.675%
Fresno, CA MSA	38,986	3.240%
Sacramento–Roseville–Folsom, CA MSA	36,999	1.494%
Milwaukee–Waukesha, WI	17,199	1.092%
Hickory–Lenoir–Morganton, NC MSA	7,560	2.006%

==== California ====
California has the largest Hmong population in the United States by state. As of 2010, there are 95,120 Hmong Americans in California.

In 2002, the State of California counted about 35,000 students of Hmong descent in schools. According to Jay Schenirer, a member of the school board of the Sacramento City Unified School District, most of the students lived in the Central Valley, in an area ranging from Fresno to Marysville. Fresno County and Sacramento County combined have almost 12,000 Hmong students.

As of 2002, of the Hmong students who took the California English Language Development Test, which measures English fluency in students who are learning English, 15% of those identifying as Hmong scored at the "advanced" or "early advanced" classifications. In comparison, 30% of California's Vietnamese students studying English, and 21% of California's more than 1.5 million English learning students scored at that same advanced level. Suanna Gilman-Ponce, the multilingual education department head of Sacramento City Unified, said that the lower rates among Hmong students can be attributed to a higher percentage of parents who speak little English; therefore the children enter American schools with fewer English skills. In addition, their culture was not literate. There was no tradition of written Hmong history or literature.

In 2011, Susan B. Anthony Elementary School in Sacramento established a Hmong-language immersion program. In 2019, Fresno Unified School district began offering dual immersion as well as elective course offerings for high school students to learn the Hmong language.

In the Fresno Unified School District, more than 10,000 signatures of support were collected for the naming of a new elementary school for General Vang Pao, a well-known leader from the Secret Wars in Laos and the Hmong American diaspora.

Some Hmong families have moved to the Emerald Triangle region, including Trinity and Siskiyou counties, to work in the marijuana farming industry.

==== Colorado ====
Colorado is home to approximately 5,000 Hmong people, who first settled in the state from late 1976 to the early 1980s. Today, most ethnic Hmong live in the north metro Denver area, including Arvada, Brighton, Broomfield, Federal Heights, Lafayette, Northglenn, Thornton and Westminster.

In 1995, Golden, Colorado became the first city in the United States to designate a Lao-Hmong Recognition Day. Since then, other areas in the country followed suit, declaring July 22 "Lao-Hmong Recognition Day". The special day honors the bravery, sacrifice, and loyalty to the United States exhibited by the Lao-Hmong. The Lao-Hmong Recognition Day was held in recognition and to honor of the Lao-Hmong Special Guerrilla Units (SGU) Veterans, "America's Secret Army and Most Loyal Allies". The SGUs were composed of indigenous Laotians, especially members of the Hmong, Lao, Mien, Lue, Khmu and Thaidam tribes. They were known for their patriotism, valiant service, personal sacrifice, and loyal support of the United States Armed Forces in Laos during the Vietnam War.

"Historically, the Lao-Hmong people were one of our country's most loyal allies. During the Vietnam War, they fought bravely alongside U.S. soldiers. Many emigrated to the U.S. and now proudly call this country their home. We are grateful for their service and sacrifice to our nation," said US Rep. Ed Perlmutter (CO-07).

The Hmong Alliance and Missionary District headquarters is located in Thornton, Colorado. In 2018, the Hmong District celebrates its fortieth-year anniversary in Saint Paul. It has more than 110 churches scattered throughout the United States with an inclusive membership of 30,000 plus people. The Hmong District is led by Rev. Dr. Lantzia Thao (Tswv Txos), who acts as the Hmong District Superintendent overseeing the entire movement and operations.

==== Kansas ====
Kansas City was one of the first cities to accept Hmong people after the war. Its Hmong population declined in the early 80s due to migration of many from Kansas to California, and to the Northern Midwest. The population has since stabilized and has more than doubled every decade since 1990. According to the 2010 Census, 1,732 Hmong people lived in Kansas, of which 1,600 lived in the Kansas side of Kansas City. More than 400 families and 2,000 Hmong were estimated to be living in the Greater Kansas City Area in 2013.

Lao Family was established in Kansas City in the 1980s. The Hmong separated from that organization to create Hmong American Community, Inc. It still operates and hosts Hmong New Year celebrations in Kansas City. Kansas City has a vast majority Green Hmong population. More than 80% of the people had converted to Christianity, although many new arrivals of Hmong people still practice traditional religion. Kansas City is home to Hmong churches, multiple Hmong-run and owned manufacturing companies, nail salons, small business such as insurance and barber shops, vendors at the flea market, and organizations such as Hmong Village Inc., Vang Organization, and Herr Organization.

==== Massachusetts ====
The Hmong community in Massachusetts is small compared to those of ethnic Vietnamese and Cambodians in the state. As of 2011, according to Judy Thao, the director of the United Hmong of Massachusetts, an organization based in Lowell, about 2,000 Hmong resided in the State of Massachusetts. Thao said that the largest community, with 60 to 70 families, is located in the Fitchburg/Leominster area. As of 2010, there are 412 people of Hmong descent living in Fitchburg (one percent of the city's population).

Thao said that about 20 to 30 families live in each of the second-largest communities, in Springfield and Brockton.

==== Michigan ====
As of 1999, fewer than 4,000 Hmong people lived in Detroit. As of 2002 the concentrations of Hmong and Laotian people in the Wayne–Macomb–Oakland tri-county area were in northeast Detroit, southern Warren, and central Pontiac. That year, Kurt Metzger and Jason Booza, authors of Asians in the United States, Michigan and Metropolitan Detroit, wrote "The 3,943 Hmong living in tri-county area is one of the most concentrated of the Asian groups."

As of 2005, Michigan had 5,400 Hmong people; reflecting an increase from 2,300 in the early 1990s. As of 2005, most Hmong in Michigan lived in Metro Detroit in the cities of Detroit, Pontiac, and Warren. As of 2007, almost 8,000 Hmong lived in Michigan, most in northeastern Detroit. As of 2007, Hmong were increasingly moving to Pontiac and Warren.

The Greater Lansing Area is home to the second-largest Hmong American population in Michigan. After 1970, Hmong Americans began to settle in Lansing, Michigan's capital city. Hmong Americans in the Greater Lansing Area, often have strong ties to such churches as St. Michael's, Our Savior Lutheran Church, and All Saints Episcopal Church, which sponsored those Hmong who came to Lansing, and provided them with resources to make the transition to America a smoother experience. Lansing hosts a statewide Hmong New Year Festival.

==== Minnesota ====
As of 1999, Minnesota has the second-largest US Hmong population by state. As of 2001, the largest Hmong population in the United States by the city is located in Saint Paul. In 2020, the Hmong-American population in Minnesota was about 90,000, and it was the largest ethnic Asian group in the state.

Pom Siab Hmoob (Gazing into the Heart of the Hmong) Theatre, which is reportedly the world's first Hmong theater group, was formed in 1990. It is based in the Twin Cities. It is now known as the Center for Hmong Arts and Talent (CHAT).

The film Gran Torino directed by Clint Eastwood, was set and filmed in Detroit, Michigan. It stars five Minnesotan Hmong (Hmongesotan) Americans. The original story was based on a neighborhood in Saint Paul. It was the first mainstream US film to feature Hmong Americans.

==== North Carolina ====
In 2010, North Carolina had a population of 10,864 Hmong. Their community has one of the highest rates of employment compared to Hmong in other states in the US. 50% of the employed Hmong adults work in the manufacturing industry. The two centers of population are in the Hickory and Greensboro areas respectively.

==== Pennsylvania ====
A group of Hmong refugees settled in Philadelphia after the end of the 1970s Laotian Civil War. They were attacked in discriminatory acts, and the city's Commission on Human Relations held hearings on the incidents. Anne Fadiman, author of The Spirit Catches You and You Fall Down, said that lower-class residents resented the Hmong receiving a $100,000 federal grant for employment assistance when they were also out of work; they believed that American citizens should be getting assistance. Between 1982 and 1984, three quarters of the Hmong people who had settled in Philadelphia left for other cities in the United States to join relatives who were already there.

==== Rhode Island ====
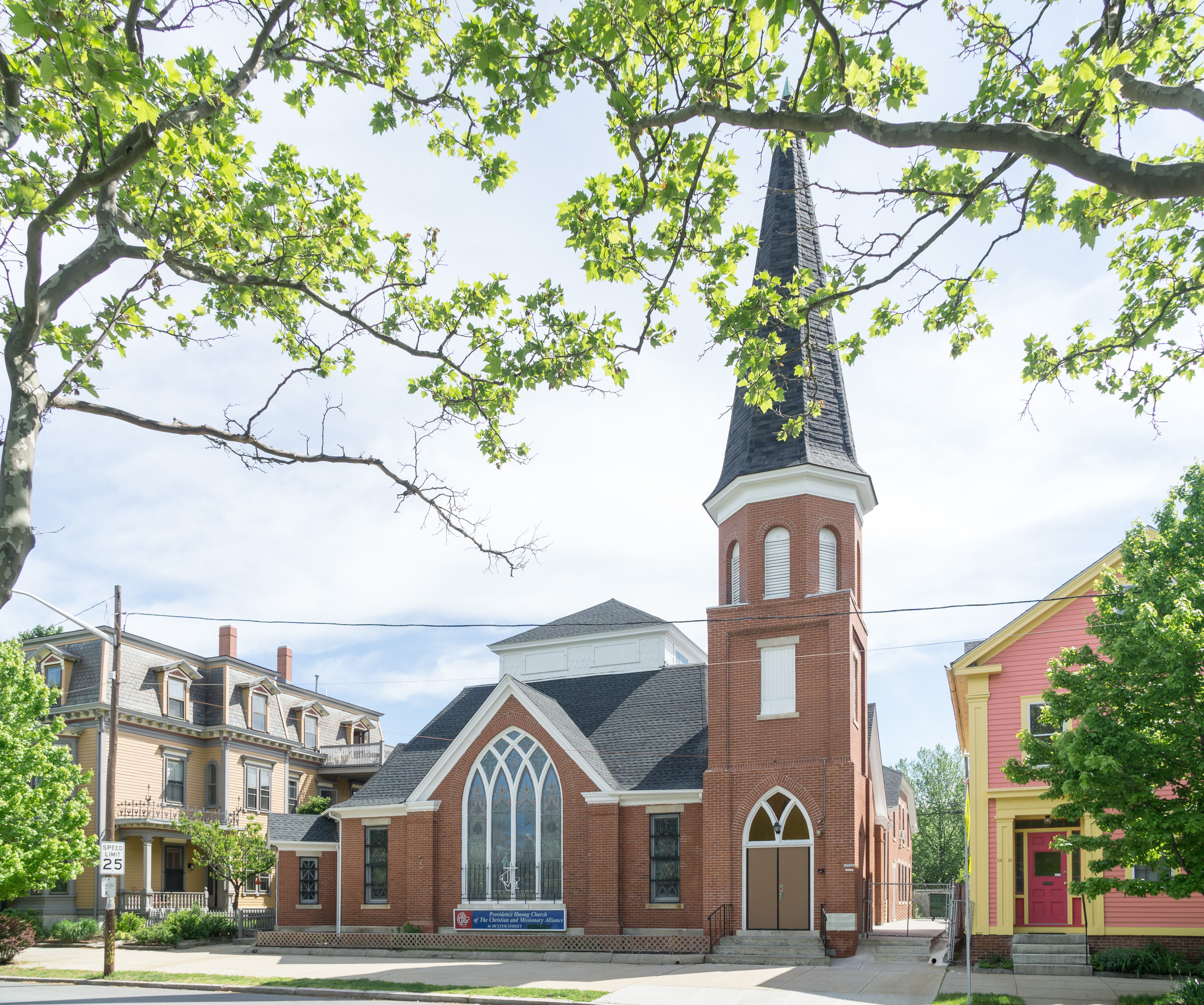
Providence (Rhode Island) Hmong Church of the Christian and Missionary Alliance

In 1976, Hmong members of the US Secret Army Special Guerrilla Unit, recruited by the CIA during the Vietnam War, were resettled in Rhode Island as refugees. In 1983, their population was estimated at 1,700–2,000. 2010 census results put the number of Rhode Island Hmong at 1,015. The Hmong United Association of Rhode Island puts on a Hmong New Year's festival annually. About sixty families are members of the Providence Hmong Church of the Christian and Missionary Alliance; they are known locally for their egg roll fundraiser, held in the spring.

==== Wisconsin ====
As of 2023, the annual American Community Survey estimates that the Hmong population of Wisconsin had increased to 70,841, making the Hmong population the largest Asian ethnic group in the state. Many Hmong refugees fleeing the Secret War settled in Wisconsin, due to the availability of faith-based, primarily Christian, sponsors.

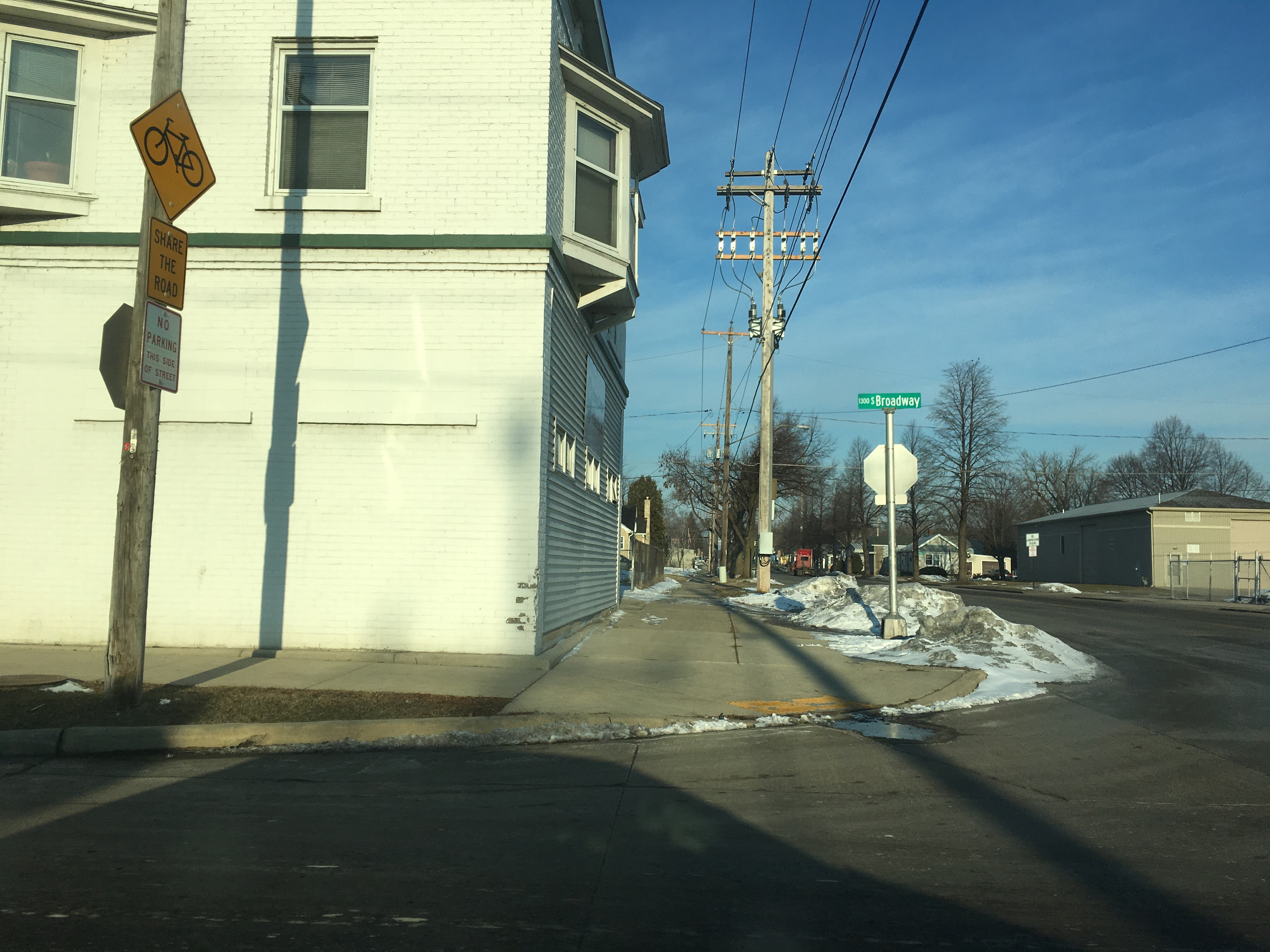
The Hmong Center on Broadway & 9th St. in Green Bay (Wisconsin)

Hmong people in Wisconsin who participate in their traditional cultural practices still have to work around the Gregorian calendar, as their religious dates use the lunar calendar. Wisconsin's weather and the schedules of family and friends also may be obstacles when celebrating events such as Hmong New Year.

==== Other locations ====
In December 1999, according to the Hmong National Development Inc., Chicago had about 500 Hmong people. There is a sizable Hmong population in Westminster, Colorado (0.8% of the city's population as of 2010).

== Community and social issues ==
=== Lack of education and high dropout rates ===
The 2000 US Census reveals that 60% of all Hmong above 24 years of age have a highest educational attainment of high school or equivalent, as many of these immigrants came to America as adults or young adults. According to a government data collected in 2013, 40% of Hmong Americans drop out of school. Among the Hmong population, 38% have not received a high school degree, and 14% have at least a bachelor's degree. Educational attainment among Hmong women is significantly lower than among Hmong men, with about one in five Hmong women having a high school diploma.

The lack of formal education among Hmong immigrants is due to the fact that many were once farmers in the hills of Laos or were refugees from war who fled into remote jungles, and had little or no access to schools.

In Saint Paul about 2,000 Hmong people have their bachelor's degree, 150 have their master's degree, and 68 have received their doctoral degree, which is a very low percentage considering the population of Hmong Americans in Saint Paul is less than 36,000.

In the topic of community issues and Hmong in education, factors to consider are family dynamic, parent engagement, accessibility to resources, and the various school climates. The lack of emotional support for Hmong LGBTQ+ youth in Minnesota and Wisconsin reveal mental and health concerns which affect their academic performance.

Hmong girls and boys had also encountered difficulties in achieving success in the field of education as they adapted the Hmong culture, which is considered as rural, to contemporary American society. Cha suggested that the dropout rate of Hmong teenagers was the highest among those of Asian American groups. In the first few years after immigration, Hmong girls almost had no chance to be educated in school. Later, as they got the opportunities to go to school, around 90% of Hmong girls chose to quit school because parents preferred obedient and compliant daughters-in-law when looking for partners for their sons.

On the other hand, Hmong young men are burdened more due to the high expectations on sons in Hmong culture, which led to their challenges in school, such as bad relationships with teachers and lack of participation in class. The word used to describe the work those Hmong boys were involved in for family was "helping out", referring to an accepted and natural habit including working outside, taking care of the siblings, completing daily household, being cultural brokers for parents and attending numerous traditional ceremonies. For example, Hmong boys were asked to write checks to pay for utility bills and to prepare food for their younger brothers. Also, they went to ceremonies not only to maintain the family relationship but also to keep the traditions from disappearing.

After three decades of struggle, Hmong Americans had achieved in economic, political and educational aspects. Starting from small business, the businesses of Hmong had become international, diverse and high-tech since 2000. For example, about 50 home health care agencies which were supported by federal or state medical assistance were run by Hmong in Minnesota. The Hmong were also more involved in political activities that 57 percent of the Hmong in Minnesota regarded themselves as Democrats, shown by a survey in 2008, and several Hmong people, including Madison P. Nguyen, former Hmong refugee women in Minnesota, had been elected political staffs in city offices.

=== Income and poverty rates ===
Data in 2022 showed Hmong Americans having a higher household income of $88,572. However the community continued to have a low per capita income of $25,948 as well as a poverty rate of 16.4% and low rate of bachelor's degree attainment of 27.3%.

2017 data collected by the US government found that Hmong Americans had a median household income of $48,000 compared to the American average of $53,600. The government estimated that 38% of Hmong Americans lived below the poverty line, compared to 16% of all Americans. The 2014 American Community Survey found that per capita income of Hmong Americans was $12,923, significantly lower than the American average of $25,825. When income is compared between US ethnic groups, Hmong Americans are the third lowest earning group. In a 2013, NPR discussion, sociologist Rosalind Chou stated that "when you break it down by specific ethnic groups, the Hmong, the Bangladeshi, they have poverty rates that rival the African-American poverty rate".

=== Culture and politics ===
There are many cultural, political, and social issues that are being debated among Hmong American communities. Topics include political participation, poverty, gang violence, race relations, and education. The Hmong community also retains many ties with the Hmong still in Indochina and remains active in regional politics. In the United States, the Hmong clan system continues to exist, but with less influence over younger generations.

Politics and culture vary with the location of Hmong-American communities. The Twin Cities, Saint Paul and Minneapolis, are progressive as the queer/LGBTQ+ culture and politics surrounding sexuality and gender are recognized at the local, regional, state, and national level.

=== Sexuality ===
Heterosexuality and heteronormativity are traditionally tied to the Hmong identity and its history but attitudes in Hmong Americans appear to be shifting. In the Hmong American community, non-traditional gender and sexual identities have gained increasing cultural, political, and social acceptance over time.

Sexual health is critical to the LGBTQ+ Hmong community as it is for the general Southeast Asian (SEA) community throughout the country. Sexual education and awareness, as well as education regarding online sex culture, is recommended when considering sexual health.

=== Mental health ===
Compared to other Southeast Asian refugees in America, Hmong refugees have the highest rates of mental health disorders, with an overall mental illness incidence rate at around 33.5%. This mental health problem has been attributed to traumatic past experiences and problems adjusting to life in the United States.

Gender roles play an integral factor for the mental health of Hmong women. Gender construct of Hmong women, traditionally, socially and politically, have historically been oppressive and marginalizing. Even in traditional Hmong cloth (paj ntaub) and folklore (dab neej) Hmong gender roles are concretely sewn and told, and repeated. Misogyny and patriarchy in the Hmong community is present to this day which calls for Hmong women empowerment initiatives throughout the United States.

In religious and traditional Hmong families the subject of mental health is taboo because of Shamanism, with the belief that remedy to health is through communication and exchanges with spirits. Through spiritual ceremonies, overall health is remedied, not through health facilities or specialists, not through science. In addition, LGBTQ+ Hmong individuals struggle with mental health due to the lack of education and attention on mental health in Hmong communities, deals with depression, anxiety, substance abuse, and suicide.

=== Health disparities ===
In other aspects of health, like cancer, Hmong Americans have the highest cancer mortality rates compared to other Asian American groups. Low cancer screenings and lack of interventions to address stigma of utilizing public health services are among some reasons for this trend. Access to education can help with increasing health practices like receiving a Pap test for cervical cancer screening. A Patient Navigation Program implemented in San Francisco for Hmong Americans led to a 38% increase in Pap test participation, highlighting progress made in increasing participation via education. A cross-sectional study of 168 immigrant Hmong Americans found that half of them reported not understanding health information. Factors like acculturation and number of years in the US were positively correlated with health literacy rate, and lower health literacy rates were associated with poor health in the participants. Acculturation indicators such as language use and social connections, were positively correlated with higher BMI-for-age in Hmong American children 9–18 years old.

A study of 417 Hmong American parents and caregivers showed that the top two contributing factors to perceived barriers to immunization were socioeconomic position and use of traditional Hmong healthcare. Traditional Hmong healthcare includes the use of a traditional Hmong healer shaman, who is used as a complement to Western medicine by Hmong patients. Health disparities faced by Hmong Americans are overlooked with combined data that do not disaggregate ethnic groups within the label, Asian American.

=== Violence ===
Hmong Americans have experienced violence after immigrating to the United States. Some specific instances of violence against Hmong Americans have been murders, of which a few have occurred while they were engaging in hunting. Hmong Americans have hunted because it is a common traditional practice in countries such as Laos, Cambodia, and Thailand. These are common countries from which the Hmong ethnic group has immigrated, although they do not have a specific home country. Chong Moua Yang, a Hmong American hunter, was murdered in Bath Township, Michigan on November 16, 2018. His murder remained a cold case until 2024, when a man was found guilty of murdering Yang and was sentenced to 22 1/2 to 60 years in prison. Another example is the murder of Ee Lee, in which a Hmong American woman in Wisconsin was raped and murdered by two teenagers in a racially motivated hate crime. One of the teenagers was sentenced to 26 years in prison, and the other to 32 years in prison.

In a 2018 study of 231 college students' experience and knowledge surrounding domestic violence, Takahashi and Lee found that two thirds were aware of domestic violence in their community, and 32.8% of Hmong women experienced violence. These domestic issues would be solved within clan systems and divorce is often not welcomed in order to maintain the relationship.

== Languages and culture ==
The Hmong language is spoken by approximately 73% of Hmong people aged 5 and older who are living in the United States. There are two main different dialects, Hmong Leeg and Hmong Dawb. In America, these are known as Hmong Leeg and White Hmong. Many of the vowel sounds are quite a bit different in these dialects compared to some of the Asian ones. In the United States, about 60% speak White Hmong and 40% speak Hmong Leeg. The Centers for Disease Control state "Though some Hmong report difficulty understanding speakers of a dialect not their own, for the most part, White and Hmong Leeg speakers seem to understand one another." As of 2012, Hmong in California are developing a Hmong-English online translator, in collaboration with Microsoft. Research in nursing shows that when translating from English to Hmong, specifically in the healthcare context, the translator must take into account the absence of equivalent concepts because Hmong comes from an oral tradition. For example, the word and concept for "prostate" does not exist. Cultural sensitivity is another consideration. For example, direct translation that mention body parts can cause discomfort.

To maintain Hmong culture, history, and language, many organizations were created to conserve Hmong culture including the Lao Veterans of America, Lao Veterans of America Institute, Lao Human Rights Council, Hmong Advancement, Inc., Hmong Advance, Inc., United League for Democracy in Laos, Inc., Lao Family, Hmong National Development (HND) association and the Hmong Today and Hmong Times newspapers. In the case of kinship among other relatives in the United States, the Hmong people tend to stay in groups where there are much other Hmong residing. This allows them to share their cultural values and practices together.

=== White Hmong and Leeg Hmong ===
White Hmong (Hmoob Dawb) and Hmong Leeg (Moob Leeg) are the two primary dialects spoken by Hmong Americans. The difference between the two dialects is analogous to the difference between American and British English. Thus, both can understand each other easily. Green Hmong is named so because of the color used in Green Hmong women's traditional costume.

There is a misconception that Moob Leeg and Green Hmong are the same. Although their dialects are the same they are both different sub-groups of the Hmong. Moob Leeg is said to be the original spoken Hmong language.

It is seen that the majority of the Hmong American population is either White or Hmong Leeg, but with language, there can be some language barriers. For example, providing quality interpreter services can be difficult. Complicating communication issues is the fact that until the late 1960s no written form of the Hmong language existed, and many of the Hmong people were unable to read or write their own language. This makes the use of written materials for Hmong patients fairly useless. This kind of complication in communicating was able to be seen in Anne Fadiman's book, The Spirit Catches You and You Fall Down: A Hmong Child, Her American Doctors, and the Collision of Two Cultures, where the Lees cannot read or write their own language and have trouble when their daughter Lia has to go to the hospital. Lack of literacy creates a barrier in being able to properly give Lia her medications.

=== Hmong American rituals and funerals ===
From funerals to soul calling, Hmong rituals and ceremonies have been an important part of the Hmong cultural and spiritual experience. Since arriving in the United States in the late 1970s, many Hmong families still practice their rituals, but the number of traditional funerals performed has dwindled due to a large number of mostly younger Hmong generations who have converted to Christianity, or are lacking the finances needed for a traditional funeral. Most funeral rituals take several days, which can conflict with the responsibilities of long work and school days in the United States.

There are several differences between traditional funeral rituals in Laos, Thailand and in the United States. In Laos and Thailand, funerals typically occur immediately in the home after a person dies. The person is dressed and then held within the hours at the home. Funerals can last three to four days and require washing and dressing the deceased, and conducting animal sacrifices to properly prepare the soul to be reincarnated.

Animism is practiced by many Hmong Americans. A study from 2006 found that about 70% of Hmong people in the United States continue to practice the traditional beliefs of animism. This is described as the belief that plants and geographic features, like mountains and rivers, all contain spirits. These sets of beliefs are Hmong spirituality divides the world into two parts, the first being the world of spirits (yeeb ceeb), and the second being the material world (yaj ceeb). Yang emphasizes that the “integration between the spirit world and the physical world is much more seamless for the Hmong than perhaps for most Westerners” and that not only are spirits believed to be in natural objects, but also in households.

The importance of the shaman's role in connecting the two worlds plays a large part in many Hmong rituals. For example, New Year's Eve (Ntoo Xeeb) is a “soul calling” (hu plig), performed by a shaman. The ritual has multiple steps, starting with burning incense and ending with ritually butchering and cooking a chicken. Traditional New Year's Eve ceremonies do not have the same constraints as some Hmong Americans have in practicing their rituals, as seen in Huang and Sumrongthong's account of a Ntoo Xeeb ceremony conducted in Thailand. Certain variables, such as differences in weather or employment schedules, contribute to the constraints that Hmong Americans face when practicing traditional rituals, much like the barriers found by those practicing Hmong funeral rites. Differences in the lunar calendar traditionally used for Hmong ceremonies and Gregorian calendar used in the United States also vary the dates that rituals are practiced by Hmong families.

== Hmongs in the media ==
=== 2007 coup conspiracy accusations and arrests ===
On June 4, 2007, following a lengthy federal investigation labeled "Operation Flawed Eagle", warrants were issued by a California-based US federal court for the arrest of General Vang Pao, eight other Hmong people, and one non-Hmong person for allegedly plotting to overthrow the government of Laos in violation of the federal Neutrality Acts and various US weapons laws.

The federal charges allege that members of the group inspected weapons, including AK-47s, smoke grenades, and Stinger missiles, with the intent of purchasing them and smuggling them into Thailand in June 2007 for use in Hmong guerrilla war efforts against the Laotian government. The one non-Hmong person of the nine arrested, Harrison Jack, is a 1968 West Point graduate, and retired Army infantry officer. The defendants faced possible life prison terms for violation. Vang Pao and other defendants were ultimately granted bail, following the posting of $1.5 million in the property. Following the arrests, many Vang Pao supporters had called on George W. Bush and California Governor Arnold Schwarzenegger to pardon the defendants. On September 18, 2009, the federal government dropped all charges against Vang Pao, announcing in a release that the federal government was permitted to consider "the probable sentence or other consequences if the person is convicted". On January 10, 2011, charges against all of the remaining defendants were dropped as well.

=== In popular culture ===
The 2008 film Gran Torino, directed by Clint Eastwood, was the first mainstream US film to feature Hmong Americans. Eastwood plays Walt Kowalski, an elderly, racist Korean War veteran living in Detroit, Michigan, who befriends a Hmong teenager named Thao, played by Bee Vang, who tries to steal his Gran Torino as an initiation into a local Hmong gang run by his own cousins.

In the episode "Body & Soul" of the TV series House, the team treats a Hmong child that is believed to be possessed by a dab, which the doctors, as well the child's mother attempt to disprove. Following an exorcism in order to free the dab from the child, his symptoms go away, which his mother and grandfather attribute to the exorcism, while the doctors believe it was the long shot treatment of Ibuprofen to treat his Patent ductus arteriosus that cured him.

== Notable people ==
At least three Hmong people have been elected to high public office. In 2002, Mee Moua became the first Hmong American legislator when she was elected to fill the Minnesota State Senate seat vacated by Randy Kelly when he was elected mayor of Saint Paul. She later became the Senate majority whip. Cy Thao is a member of the Minnesota House of Representatives.

At age 14, Joe Bee Xiong fought alongside American soldiers like his father had done. When their village fell to the Communists, Xiong and his family fled to a refugee camp in Thailand and eventually ended up in Wisconsin in 1980. In 1996, Xiong was elected to the Eau Claire, Wisconsin, city council. Xiong was the first Hmong to be elected to a city council in Wisconsin. He ran for the state Assembly in 2004. Xiong was traveling with family in his native country, Laos, when he died, possibly of heart-related complications.

Community leaders and organizations, including Wangyee Vang, Cherzong Vang, the Lao Veterans of America, the Lao Veterans of America Institute, the Center for Public Policy Analysis, the Lao Human Rights Council, and others, have sought to educate the public and policymakers about the important contribution of the Hmong people, and Lao Hmong veterans, during the Vietnam War in support of US national security interests. In 1997, the Lao Veterans of America dedicated a monument in Arlington National Cemetery, the Laos Memorial, to help honor the Hmong veterans and community for their service to the United States during the Vietnam War and its aftermath. Each year, in May, they continue to host annual ceremonies with members of the US Congress and other officials, to honor the service of the Hmong. Many Hmong elders and young people attend the ceremonies and events in Washington, D.C.

Sunisa Lee of Saint Paul, Minnesota, is a six-time Olympic gymnastic Medalist. In the 2020 Summer Olympics, she first won Silver in the Women's artistic team all-around, followed by Gold in the Women's artistic individual all-around and then Bronze in the Women's uneven bars. In the 2024 Summer Olympics, she won Gold in the Women's artistic team all-around, followed by Bronze in the Women's artistic individual all-around and Bronze in the Women's uneven bars. Suni is also the first Hmong-American Gymnast to perform in the Olympics.

In 2022, Sheng Thao became the first Hmong American woman elected mayor of a major city in the United States (Oakland).

In 2024, Mai Xiong was elected to the Michigan House of Representatives and became the first Hmong American to serve in the Michigan legislature.

In 2026, Yee Leng Xiong was elected treasurer of Wisconsin, and became the first Hmong American to hold statewide office.

== List ==
=== Arts, entertainment and media ===
- Ahney Her, actress (Gran Torino)
- Foung Hawj, pioneer Hmong-American broadcaster, media artist, and Minnesota State Senator
- Lexus "Lexi" Vang, leader of the American girl group Girlset
- Michael Vang, soccer player
- Bee Vang, actor (Gran TorinoGran Torino)
- Brenda Song, actress and teen star (The Suite Life of Zack & CodyThe Suite Life of Zack & Cody); "Song" is an anglicized spelling of "Xiong"
- Yia Vang, Hmong-American chef

=== Government, politics and public service ===
- Joe Bee Xiong, former Eau Claire, Wisconsin, City Councilman
- Kaohly Her, Minnesota State Representative and mayor-elect of Saint Paul
- Susan Pha, Minnesota State Senator
- Sheng Thao, first Hmong-American woman to become mayor of a major city in the United States (Oakland)
- Cy Thao, Minnesota State Representative
- Steve Ly, former mayor of Elk Grove, California
- Mai Vang, first Hmong elected to the Sacramento City Council
- Yee Leng Xiong, 38th Treasurer of Wisconsin and first Hmong American elected to a statewide office in the United States
- Mai Xiong, Michigan state representative
- Mee Moua, Minnesota State Senator

=== Leadership, advocacy and military ===
- Cherzong Vang, Hmong community leader, educator, youth advocate, and past President of the Lao Veterans of America
- Vang Pao, Royal Lao Army Major General and revered Hmong leader
- Hang Sao, Hmong-American activist, lieutenant colonel in the Royal Lao Army, and advisor to the King of Laos in exile

=== Literature, academia and law ===
- Dia Cha, author, professor, and anthropologist at St. Cloud State University
- Kao Ly Ilean Her, attorney, activist, and first Hmong woman to pass the bar exam in Minnesota
- Mai Na Lee, Hmong scholar and professor
- Mai Neng Moua, writer
- Houa Vue Moua, author and community activist
- Vang Pobzeb, Hmong scholar, PhD, human rights and international relations expert
- Ka Vang, writer
- Zha Blong Xiong, first Hmong professor
- Kao Kalia Yang, writer and author of The Latehomecomer: A Hmong Family Memoir
- Kou Yang, Hmong scholar and professor

=== Sports, gaming and public figures ===
- Sunisa "Suni" Lee, Olympic gymnastics all-around and team gold medalist, and first Hmong-American Olympic gymnast
- Chai Vang, ex-National Guardsman and convicted murderer
- Xao "Jerry" Yang, 2007 World Series of Poker Main Event Champion

== See also ==
- Hmong Cultural Center Museum
- Asian Americans
- Laotian Americans
