= Hmong Studies Journal =

- Language: English
- Edited by: Mark Pfeifer

Publication details
- History: 1996–present
- Frequency: Irregular
- Open access: Yes
- License: Creative Commons BY-NC-ND

Standard abbreviations
- ISO 4: Hmong Stud. J.

Indexing
- ISSN: 1091-1774

Links
- Journal homepage

The Hmong Studies Journal is an irregularly published, peer-reviewed academic journal covering studies on the Hmong people. The journal was established in 1996 and the editor in chief and publisher is Mark Pfeifer. The journal is indexed by Academic Search Complete and ProQuest.
