= Houa Vue Moua =

Houa Vue Moua (born c1954), along with co-author Barbara J. Rolland, wrote the book, Trail Through The Mists, which tells the story of Moua's early life in Laos during the Secret War and her harrowing escape to Thailand during the subsequent Hmong diaspora.

Moua, along with her husband Yong Kay Moua and other members of her family, was one of the early Hmong refugees to resettle in Wisconsin. There she became a bilingual mediator for the emerging Hmong community, specializing in health issues. The community outreach efforts of Houa and Yong Kay were recognized in 1990 by the first President Bush with a Thousand Points of Light Award. Houa also acted as a spokeswoman for Hmong community, presenting workshops on Hmong culture, religion, and history. In 1998, the Office of Multicultural Affairs and Women’s Studies Consortium of the University of Wisconsin System honored her for her contribution to diversity education.
