= Dia Cha =

Laotian Hmong American academic

- Diav Tsab
- Occupations: Author, researcher, professor

Academic work
- Discipline: Ethnic studies
- Sub-discipline: Asian American studies

Dia Cha is a Hmong Laotian American author and academic who has written books for both children and adults.

== Early life ==
She was born in the early 1960s in Southeast Asia. After the Vietnam War, her family immigrated to the United States of America.

In 1975, Dia and the surviving members of her family, were forced to flee the advancing communist movement, Pathet Lao in their takeover of her home country of Laos. She soon found herself a refugee in Thailand.

She eventually settled in the United States in 1979, where she was able to begin formal studies in the ninth grade. In 1983, she graduated from Abraham Lincoln High School, in Denver, Colorado, ranking thirtieth in a class of 251 students. In 1987, she joined the Institute of Foreign Studies and spent a semester studying at the University of London.

== Career ==
In December 1989, Dia received the degree of Bachelor of Arts in anthropology from Metropolitan State College, Denver, Colorado. In December, 1992, she was awarded a Master of Arts in applied anthropology from Northern Arizona University in Flagstaff, Arizona. After additional studies, she received the degree of Doctor of Philosophy from the University of Colorado at Boulder, Colorado. Dia Cha is considered to be the first Hmong women to receive her PHD.

In the 1990s, Dia wrote Dia's Story Cloth which is now considered to be one of the utmost popular books on Hmong story clothes. Along with Norma Livo, she co-wrote Folk Stories of the Hmong and Teaching with Folk Stories of the Hmong: An Activity Book. Her poetry and short stories have appeared in "Bamboo Among the Oaks" as well as the "Paj Ntaub Voice" Hmong literary journal.

Additionally, she was an Associate Professor of Anthropology and Ethnic Studies at St. Cloud State University, in St. Cloud, Minnesota. There, she taught courses in cultural anthropology, ethnic studies, Southeast Asian communities, Asian American studies, and Hmong studies.

As of 2013, she was CEO of Your Consulting Services, Inc.

== Bibliography ==
- Cha, Dia (April 1, 1996). Dia's story cloth. Illustrated by Chue and Nhia Thao Cha (1st ed.). Lee & Low Books. pp. 1–24. ISBN 978-1880000632.
- Cha, Dia (March 1, 2004). Hmong American concepts of health, healing, and conventional medicine (1st ed.). Routledge. ISBN 0415944953.
- Cha, Dia; Livo, Norma J. (May 15, 2000). Teaching with Folk Stories of the Hmong: An Activity Book (Learning Through Folklore Series) (Kindle ed.). Libraries Unlimited. pp. 1–109. ASIN B00ET8OVJK.
- Cha, Dia (January 1, 2005). "Hmong and Lao refugee women: reflections of a Hmong-American woman anthropologist" (PDF). Hmong Studies Journal (Essay). 6. Hmong Studies Internet Resource Center. GALE|A207351169. Archived from the original on December 19, 2005.
- Cha, Dia; Vang, Chia Youyee; Her, Leena; Lee, Pao; Jalao, Ly Chong Thong; Schein, Louisa; Vang, Ma; Xiong, Yang S. (March 13, 2008) [2005]. "Perspectives: Knowledge, Authority and Hmong Invisibility". Diverse. DiverseEducation.com.
