= Steve Ly =

American politician

Mayor of Elk Grove
- In office December 7, 2016 – December 8, 2020
- Preceded by: Gary Davis
- Succeeded by: Bobbie Singh-Allen

Personal details
- Party: Independent
- Education: University of California, Davis

Steve Ly is an American politician who served as mayor of Elk Grove, Sacramento County, California from 2016 to 2020. Before serving as mayor, he was a part of the Elk Grove City Council of District 4. Steve Ly also served on the Elk Grove Unified School District, Board of Trustees.

He was the second directly elected mayor of Elk Grove and the first ethnically Hmong mayor in the United States.

On November 3, 2020, Ly was defeated by Bobbie Singh-Allen in his bid for a third term as mayor.

== Early life, education, and career ==
Steve and his family immigrated from Xiangkhouang Province, Laos to the United States during the Vietnam War, when Steve was 4 years old. He graduated from the University of California, Davis with a degree in Sociology and Political Science.

Among others, Steve has served as the Director to Asian Pacific School Board Members Association, the Director to the Hmong National Development, on the Sacramento County Sheriffs Community Advisory Board, on the California State Advisory Council on Refugee Assistance and Services, and as an Elk Grove city councilman. He has also provided academic support and counseling to youth in juvenile hall.

== City council ==
Steve Ly was the City Councilmember for District 4 between 2014 and 2016.

== Mayor of Elk Grove ==
Elected on November 8, 2016, and winning re-election on December 12, 2018, he has advocated for youth education and empowerment, boosting the economy with more infrastructure, civic amenities, and jobs.

Steve Ly ran for a 3rd term in the 2020 mayoral race against Bobbie Singh-Allen and Brian Pastor, defeated by the former.

=== Civic amenities ===
Ly has taken credit for building a Costco, aquatics center, animal shelter, veterans hall, community center, and senior center.

=== Infrastructure ===
The City of Elk Grove has approved plans the construction of a hospital by Dignity Health. Ly has championed a second hospital and a biotech center, though the project is mired in controversy.

== Personal life ==
Ly is married to his wife Cua and has 2 children. He lives with his family in Elk Grove.

== Controversy ==
=== Allegations of false campaign claims ===
During the 2020, Ly sent voters a mailer with the photo of a retired Sacramento County Sheriff's Sergeant and the official photo of Elk Grove's Chief of Police. The retired Sergeant was quoted as saying Ly had been exonerated of all charges leveled against him by local women. Ly included a quote taken out of context from a prior statement made by the Chief of Police to suggest Elk Grove Police had investigated and cleared him of all charges. The quote was actually taken from a statement the Chief had made concerning a complaint made by one woman about harassing phone calls from Ly supporters and not the other allegations under investigation by the Grand Jury.

=== Debate disruption ===
On September 29, 2020, Ly was scheduled to debate his mayoral opponents, Bobbie Singh-Allen and Brian Pastor, at an event sponsored by the Elk Grove Chamber of Commerce Political Action Committee and broadcast online throughout the community. Ly supporters surrounded the debate hall holding electric megaphones. Each time Ms. Singh-Allen was called upon to speak, they blared loud sirens to drown out her words. The sirens stopped when Ly spoke. Debate officials asked Mayor Ly to direct his supporters to stop disrupting the debate. He refused, claiming he had no involvement in the protest. Later, video revealed that Ly campaign staff were leading the crowd, including of Ly campaign director. The debate had to be suspended early. Singh-Allen and Pastor issued a joint statement criticizing Ly for his refusal to request the crowd to stop.

=== California North State University Medical Center ===
Ly accepted more than $48,000 in contributions from the proponents of a proposed hospital project. The project was mired in controversy and opposed by the Federal Fish and Wildlife Service, California Department of Transportation, Audubon Society, and numerous environmental and community groups. Despite the controversy, Ly insisted that he supported the project and that it was not inappropriate to accept nearly 20% of campaign funds from proponents of the project. At the proposed hospital site, Ly dispatched a city aide to confront the protestors. The aide later resigned.

The California North State University Medical Center was going to be the first teaching hospital in this region, however City of Elk Grove planning commission did not approve after political pressure. After this, the City of Sacramento took on the project.
