= Vue Pa Chay =

Hmong revolutionary

Paj Cai Vwj
- 𖬖𖬰𖬪𖬵 𖬋𖬯 𖬘𖬲𖬜
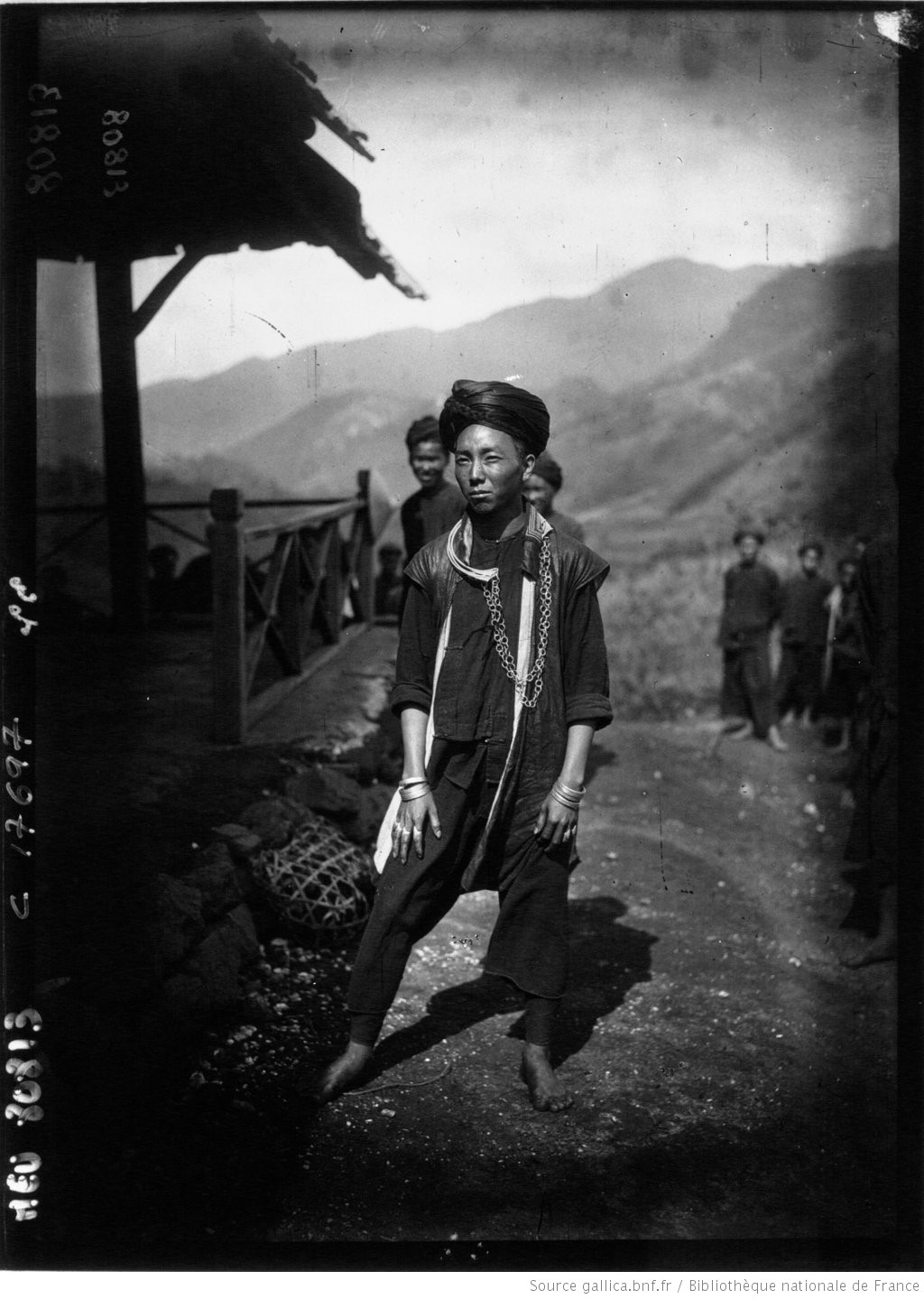
- This picture was taken in Sa Pa (Chapa), Lao Kay province, Vietnam, in August or September 1918 (Michaud J. 2020. "Is this Pa Chay Vue? A study in three frames." The Journal of the Royal Asiatic Society. 31(2): 363-91)
- Born: 1899/1900; Tonkin (north Vietnam)
- Died: 1921; French Indochina
- Known for: Leader of a Hmong rebel against the Heavy French taxation during French Indochina

Pa Chay Vue, (RPA: Paj Cai Vwj or Puas Cai Vwj; Pahawh: 𖬖𖬰𖬪𖬵 𖬋𖬯 𖬘𖬲𖬜), commonly referred to as Pa Chay or Batchai, led the Hmong people in the War of the Insane revolt against French rule in French Indochina from 1918 to 1921. He was considered a hero among the Hmong nationalists, but regarded as a crazed man among the French-subdued Hmong, but in present times, he is unanimously considered a national hero.

== Youth ==
Pa Chay was a Hmong Vue orphan who grew up in Lào Cai Province, Vietnam, which is still a stronghold of the Hmong. He was raised by an Vue uncle, Xao Chu Vue (RPA: Xauv Tswb Vwj) who adopted him. After his marriage and the birth of his first child he claimed to be called by God to show the Hmong how to live in good health and harmony with their environment and to free the Hmong people from the oppressors, mainly the Tai and French. As proof of his divine calling, he performed spectacular feats, such as jumping onto the top of a house, making a ball of cotton explode, etc. He was also instructed on a Hmong writing system which was practiced by many of his followers. People began to revere Pa Chay as the long-awaited Hmong leader who the elders have been waiting for to usher a period where Hmong would again have a kingdom.

Pa Chay used his influence and the reputation of his miraculous powers to convince his followers that he could deliver his people from French domination. Many Hmong united and began a nationalist Hmong movement which drew villagers from all over northern Laos, northern Vietnam, and parts of southern China. Pa Chay then organized the Hmong nationalists to fight against the French in the rebellion known as "Guerre Du Fou" (Madman's War "Rog Paj Cai"). He also attracted the support of other oppressed minorities, mainly the Mab Daum and Khmu.

== The war ==
The stimulus for the rebellion was heavy taxation by the French and abuse of power by the ethnic Lao and Tai tax collectors. The Hmong people were divided into two opposing sides - those who resented the yoke of slavery under France, and those few who benefited from French patronage at the expense of their own people.

The rebellion, called "Rog Paj Cai" by the Hmong Nationalists and "Rog Phim Npab" by Hmong who sided with the French, was a self-initiated and self-sustaining movement; all the guns were the Hmong-designed and manufactured flintlocks (a bit different from the traditional western flintlock gun). The gunpowder was also of a Hmong sort (salt peter, charcoal, and guano are used similar to western black powder, but shavings from a type of tree is added to increase the explosivity). The Hmong won battle after battle, in for the majority of the rebellion; the French were surprised and did not know how to fight in the jungles nor did they know how to fight a near invisible army. France was also heavily involved in World War I in Europe, and resorted to using 50% French and 50% native Vietnamese, Lao, and Tai, and traitor Hmong soldiers, who all had little desire to fight the liberating Hmong forces.

The following below is incorrect. This was during the Indochina war between the Chinese and Hmong:

One particular weapon that especially scared the French army was the Hmong cannon, made with the trunk of a tree, and packed with metal pieces from pots, and a lot Hmong gunpowder. This cannon was designed by Kuab Chav, and is said to have weighed over 200 lbs, such that only one man named Lwv was able to carry it. As the French army came up the mountainous trails, the cannon would spray the metal shards at the French army, sending them into hiding while wounding and killing many of them. They never knew what it was because they assumed the Hmong did not have the technology to build such a weapon.

The French morale was also weakened because of rumors of that Pa Chay's army was protected by magic. As the French Army chased the Hmong army through the mountainous passes and ravines, they never saw any dead Hmong soldiers. The reason was that Pa Chay had commanded his men to never leave anyone behind, and to cover up the blood as quickly as possible. This gave the illusion to the French that indeed Pa Chay's army was invincible.

Kao Mee, a sister of Pa Chay, also played an important role. She carried a white flag made of hemp, which she used to deflect bullets. She is said to have been a righteous virgin, which is why the Heavens allowed her to have such miraculous powers. She led the army into many successful battles.

At its height, the rebellion encompassed 40,000 square kilometres of Indochina, from Điện Biên Phủ in Tonkin to Nam Ou in Luang Prabang, and from Muong Cha north of Vientiane to Sam Neua in Laos.

== Death ==
He was assassinated by Hmong traitors, in a trap. He was carrying his child on his back, and out of nowhere, the betrayer shotgunned him, the bullet went through the child and Vu Pa Chai. The child died. Vu Pa Chai said his last words to Hmong people : "Hmong are cruel, because of their evil deeds, they will gather what they sow...”

== Aftermath ==
The French were not satisfied with this however; they captured many of those who had laid down their arms and sent them to Xieng Khouang (the headquarters for the colonial power in Laos) where some of them were decapitated and some were thrown off of high platforms into glass shards. A man known as Tus Cheem Rog (the one who stopped the war - presumed by many to be Savina), came to plea on behalf of the people so that not everyone who was sent to Xieng Khouang would have to die. This man came to stay at Txooj Tub Yiv Vwj's house in Xieng Khoung and left his heavy jacket. He is described as a tall non-Hmong person who spoke fluent Hmong. Interesting enough he is also described as having worn a turban head wrap.

Kao Mee was also hunted down and killed by Khmu and French soldiers.

The French offered a bounty of 20 silver bars, and then 200 silver bars to find the family of Pa Chay. They claimed it was because they had taken away Pa Chay, so they wanted to care for his wife and kids. Of course no Hmong person was stupid enough to betray the family. Everytime the French came into his village, the villagers would tell them that Pa Chay's wife was just an old Hmoob Lauj lady with no children. They left her alone, either because she was so old, or because they knew it wasn't true. Regardless, when that old lady died, Pa Chay's family killed a white buffalo for her because she was willing to take the punishment on behalf of the family.

== Legacy ==
The revolt against the French served to strengthen the bond between the pro-French Hmong leaders and their colonial rulers for another generation. Kiatong LoBliaYao (Lauj Npliaj Yob), a French loyalist and puppet leader, extorted many silver bars from those who had been loyal to Pa Chay Vue in exchange for their lives, an action that many Hmong still remember even today, and which also ultimately caused his power to be given to Touby Lyfoung, his nephew. Touby Lyfoung was the famous Hmong royalist who fought, in succession, the Japanese, the Vietnamese and the Lao Communists.

To this day there is still a flower, called Pa Chay's grass (Nroj Paj Cai), that blooms every year around the months of December and January. This little red flower appeared for the first time following his death that year and thus it was named in his honor to commemorate his legacy.

The communist Vietnamese and Lao government created a military squadron in honor of Pa Chay, called, (Kong Pang Pa Chai) Koos Phaas Paj Cai. This squadron was heavily used during the Vietnam war as propaganda to recruit Hmong people, and to do ambush attacks. All members of this squadron are of the Hmong ethnic group, though in recent years there has been an effort to integrate more Laotian into the unit to prevent any possible collusion of rebellion. The squadron is heavily used to fight the Chao Fa (Hmong Freedom Fighters) in Laos.
