= Luj Yaj =

Luj Yaj (Lue Yang) 𖬆𖬶𖬞 𖬖𖬰𖬤
- Born: Luj Yaj; 1962 (age 62–63)
- Origin: Hmong (Thailand)
- Years active: 1991-Present
- Website: http://www.loojceebentertainment.com/music_video/musics/male/lujyaj.htm

Lue Yang (RPA: Luj Yaj, Pahawh: 𖬆𖬶𖬞 𖬖𖬰𖬤) is a popular Hmong singer from Thailand. He is considered to be one of the most well known of Hmong singers to date. He gained notoriety when two of his songs appeared in a Hmong dubbed Thai film called "Kev Hlub Txiav Tsis Tau". Those two songs were "Nco Koj Ib Leeg" (Miss You Only), which later became known to many under the title of "Nco Kuv Me Me" (Miss Me A Little), and "Nyob Ib Leeg" (Living Alone). "Nco Koj Ib Leeg" and "Nco Kuv Me Me" are his most famous works, and still remain popular among Hmong youth in America.

He has also starred in movies like "Vim Tsawg Ib Los Lus", and was the first Hmong singers from Thailand to have come to the United States.

S.T. Universal Video introduced Luj Yaj to the Hmong entertainment industry in the early 1990s. The production company is also credited for introducing Tsab Mim Xyooj, Pov Thoj, Maiv Muas, and other well-known artists in the mid-1990s.
