= Chia Youyee Vang =

Scholar of Hmong-American history

- Txiab Tswv Yim Vaj
- Born: June 5, 1971 (age 55); Xiengkhouang, Laos
- Occupation: Professor
- Years active: 2006–present

Academic work
- Institutions: University of Wisconsin-Milwaukee
- Notable works: Hmong America: Reconstructing Community in Diaspora (2010)

Chia Youyee Vang is a professor of history at the University of Wisconsin-Milwaukee. Her research and writing deals with the Hmong diaspora, other Southeast Asian diasporas and refugees and on community-building efforts among Hmong people in the United States.

Vang is the author of the books Hmong in Minnesota and Hmong America : reconstructing community in diaspora. She is also the co-editor of Claiming Place: On the Agency of Hmong Women. Hmong America has been described as "the first scholarly examination of the Hmong experience in the U.S."

== Biography ==
Vang was born in Laos on June 5, 1971. She was displaced by the Vietnam War and resettled in Saint Paul, Minnesota as a child. Her parents were farmers, both in Laos and in Minnesota. As a child, she and her siblings spent summers harvesting vegetables and selling crops alongside her parents. She received a bachelor's degree from Gustavus Adolphus College (1994), a master's degree (1996) and Ph.D. (2006) from the University of Minnesota. She began teaching at the University of Wisconsin-Milwaukee in 2006 where she became the first Hmong tenure-track faculty member. There, she established an interdisciplinary Hmong Diaspora Studies program, of which she is the director. The program was developed in response to growing demands from Asian-American students calling for coursework that reflected their life experiences; the Hmong were the largest Asian ethnic group on campus, representing 2% of the student body.

Vang is now a full professor at the University of Wisconsin-Milwaukee and is the university's Vice Chancellor for Community Empowerment & Institutional Inclusivity.

Vang is married to Tong Yang. Together they have one daughter and two sons.

== Scholarship ==
Vang is best known for her book 2010 Hmong America: reconstructing community in diaspora. Described as "both ethnography and an insider's account", the book's methods include "archival research, oral history interviews, and observations of community gatherings." The book describes the migration of 130,000 Hmong from Southeast Asia to the United States following the Vietnam War, and the evolution of Hmong communities in the United States, starting with early networks based on kinship ties, and evolving into formal organizations and churches. It focuses on people who entered the United States as "refugees" rather than as "immigrants". It argues that the timing of the Hmong migration, coming after the societal shifts of the Civil Rights Era, gave Hmong people greater opportunity for social, economic, and cultural success in the United States than many waves of immigrants before them. Credit also goes to community leaders among the Hmong who used their loyalty to Americans and their opposition to communism during the Laotian Civil War to build social and political capital for their people.

The book has been recognized for documenting the role of Hmong Christianity in the United States, in contrast to previous studies that focused on religion as a site of difference between non-Christian Hmong and a majority-Christian population in the United States. The book has been criticized for excessive focus on Hmong in Minnesota (the focus of Vang's first book) and in the upper Midwest to the exclusion of some other areas of Hmong resettlement such as Arkansas.

Erika Lee for Journal of Asian American Studies lists Yang as part of the "first generation of Hmong American scholars" along with others such as Mai Na Lee.

In 2016, Vang co-edited and contributed a chapter to the book Claiming Place: On the Agency of Hmong Women, which argues that women's empowerment can occur within the Hmong cultural context, despite assumptions that Hmong culture oppresses women. Drawing on the fields of Gender studies and Postcolonial studies, the authors contend that Hmong women have evinced their agency in education, professional, entrepreneurial, spiritual, and domestic spheres.

== Awards received ==
- Hmong Woman of the Year Award (2010)
- University of Wisconsin Regents' Diversity Award (2016)
- University of Wisconsin System Outstanding Woman of Color in Education Award (2014)
