= Zha Blong Xiong =

Hmong American academic

- Zam Nplooj Xyooj
- Born: Laos
- Occupations: Associate professor, Department of Family Social Science, College of Education and Human Development at the University of Minnesota

Academic background
- Education: Winona State University
- Alma mater: University of Minnesota, Twin Cities
- Thesis: Hmong American Parent-Adolescent Problem-Solving Interactions: An Analytic Induction Analysis

Academic work
- Discipline: Adjustment of adolescents, parent/adolescent relationships in immigrant families, parent education

Zha Blong Xiong is an associate professor in the Department of Family Social Science in the College of Education and Human Development at the University of Minnesota, Twin Cities, USA. He specializes in adjustment of adolescents, parent/adolescent relationships in immigrant families, and parent education. In less than 20 years Xiong has gone from being a refugee who spoke no English to becoming the first Hmong tenured professor at the University of Minnesota and the first at a major research university in the United States.

== Early life and education ==
Xiong was born in Laos. His family came to the United States as refugees, arriving in Minnesota in February 1982 when he was 15 years old. He had "very little formal education" prior to attending high school, first in Rosemount and then in Hastings the following year, where he decided to start over, enrolling in 9th grade again.

After graduating from high school Xiong attended Winona State University, earning a B.A. in psychology. He then attended the University of Minnesota, Twin Cities, where he earned an M.A. and Ph.D. in family social science with a dissertation entitled "Hmong American Parent-Adolescent Problem-Solving Interactions: An Analytic Induction Analysis".

== Honors & Awards ==
- 2011, Lee Knefelkamp Research Award, Minnesota College Personnel Association, Minnesota
- 2014, Outstanding Leadership Award, Lao Family Foundation
- 2017, Certificate of Outstanding Leadership, Hmong 18 Council, Inc.
- 2017, Community Outreach and Engagement Faculty Award, College of Education and Human Development
