= 2007 Laotian coup d'état conspiracy allegation =

Allegations made by the U.S. Department of Justice

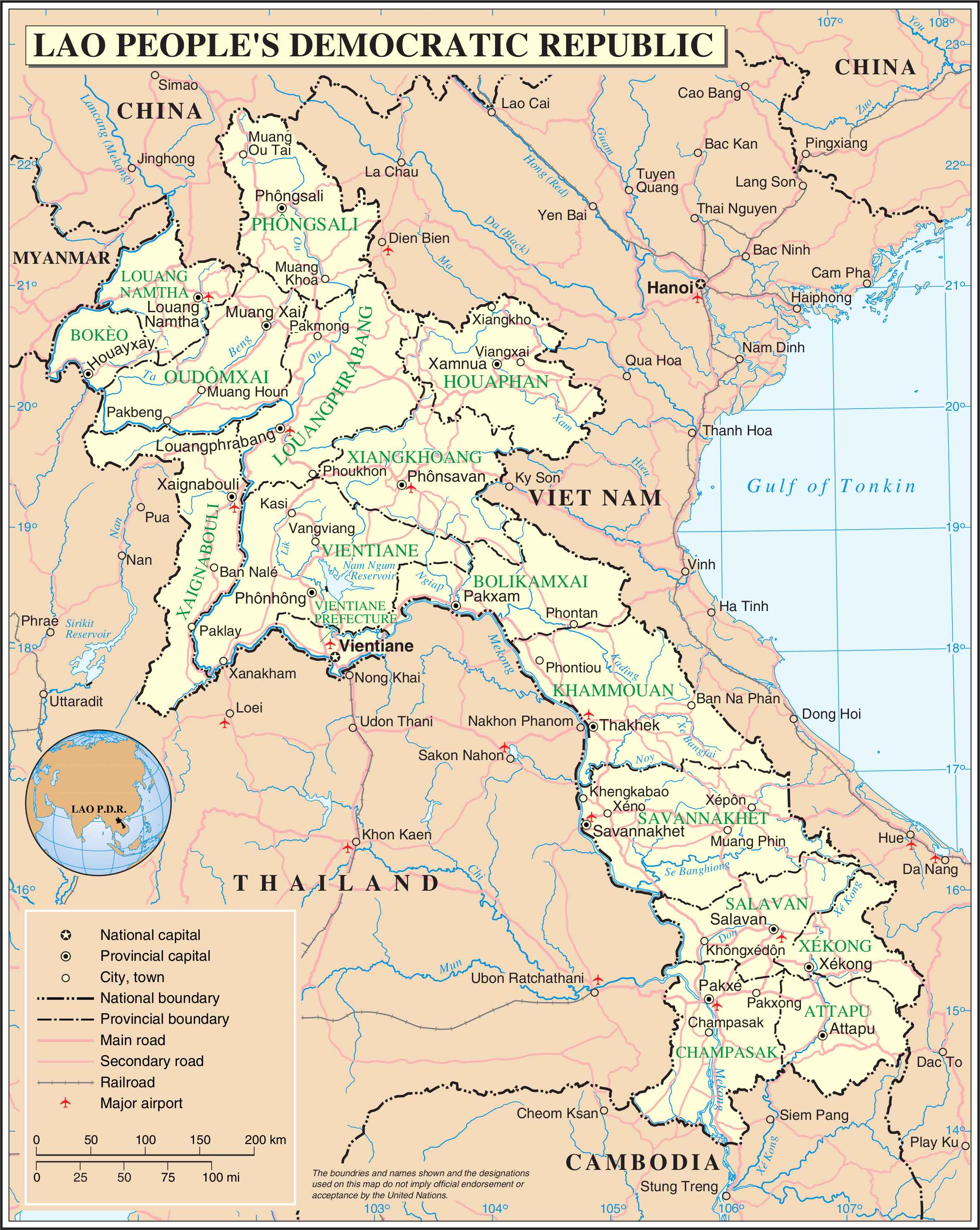
Map of Laos

The alleged 2007 Laotian coup d'état plan was a conspiracy allegation by the United States Department of Justice that Lt. Col. Harrison Jack (Ret.) and former Royal Lao Army Major General Vang Pao, among others conspired in June 2007 to obtain large amounts of heavy weapons and ammunition to overthrow the Communist government of Laos in violation of the Neutrality Act. The charges were ultimately dropped and the case instead served to further highlight major human rights violations by the Lao government against the Hmong ethnic minority, Laotian refugees, and political dissidents.

== History ==
On June 4, 2007, the U.S. Department of Justice announced they had arrested ten individuals in connection with the alleged plot as part of a joint investigation by the Bureau of Alcohol, Tobacco, Firearms and Explosives, the Federal Bureau of Investigation, and the Joint Terrorism Task Force. The operation, dubbed "Operation Tarnished Eagle," alleges Lt. Col. Harrison Jack (Ret.), former Royal Lao Army Major General Vang Pao, Lo Cha Thao, Youa True Vang, Hue Vang, Chong Vang Thao, Seng Vue, Chu Lo, and Lo Thao conspired in June 2007 to obtain scores of AK-47 assault rifles, ground-to-air Stinger missiles, M72 LAW rockets, AT-4 anti-tank missiles, landmines, rockets, explosives and smoke grenades in allegedly planning an attempt to overthrow the government of Laos in violation of the Neutrality Act.

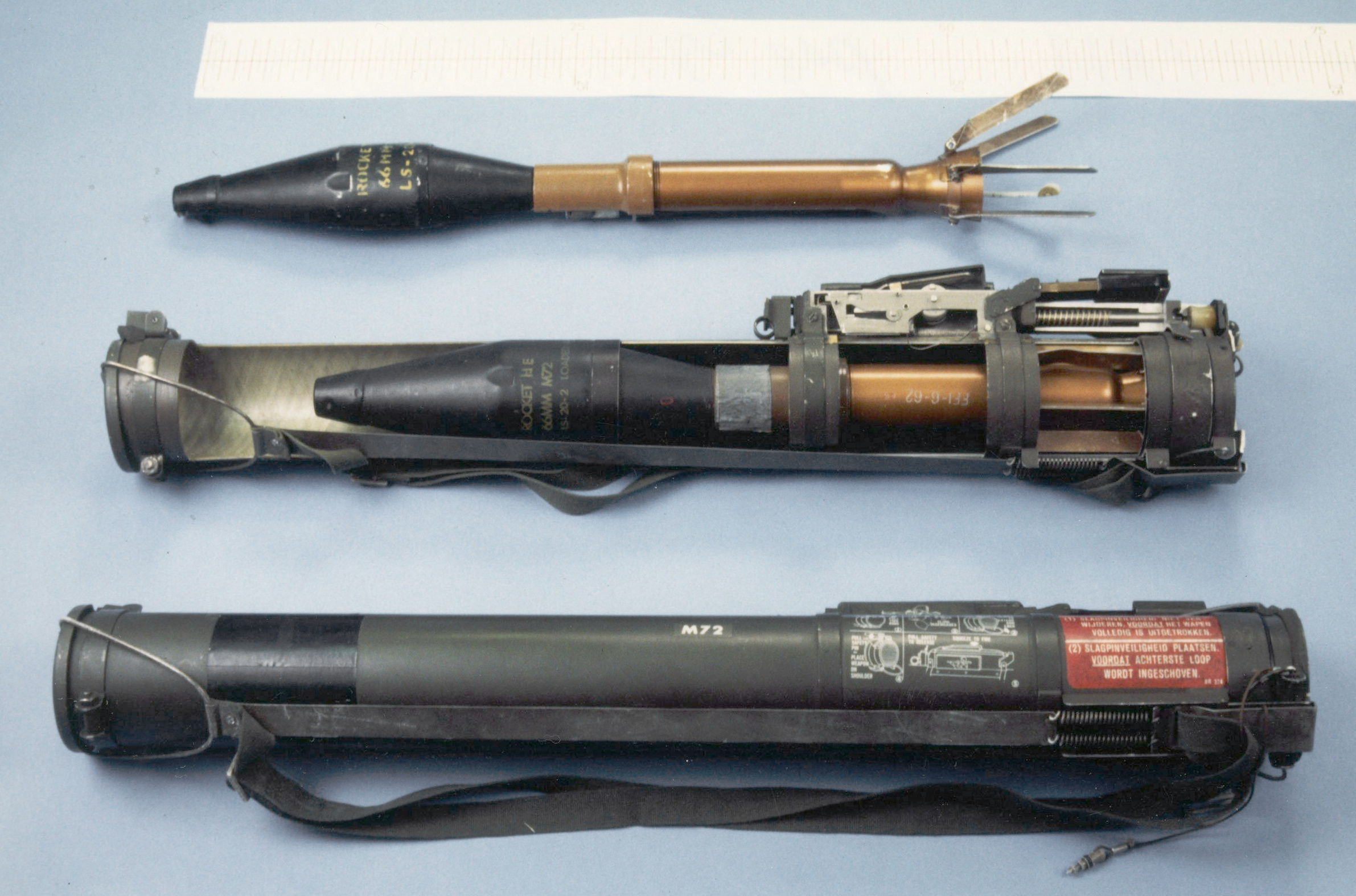
The weapons sought included the M72 light anti-tank weapon.

On June 14, Dang Vang was also arrested in connection to the alleged plot. In an affidavit by Graham Barlowe, a group supervisor of the Bureau of Alcohol, Tobacco, Firearms and Explosives, it is alleged that at the time of Vang's arrest, he admitted preparing the operations plan.

After initially denying bail, the U.S. federal judge ultimately reversed the bail decision, granting Vang Pao and the other defendants bail, even while labeling all of them flight risks, given their access to significant financial resources and private airplanes.

The Bureau of Alcohol, Tobacco, Firearms and Explosives lead agent has also stated in a court affidavit that "probable cause exists to believe" that former Wisconsin State Senator Gary George was part of the conspiracy.

On April 23, 2008, it was reported that U.S. Magistrate Judge Dale A. Drozd would hear arguments in November for motions seeking information U.S. intelligence agencies might have on the alleged coup plotters, including whether the government has intercepted electronic communication between Hmong in the United States and Laos.

The defendants' lawyers argued that the case against all of their clients was spurious at best. "The case cannot proceed [because] the process has been so corrupted by the government's misconduct that there can never be any confidence in the validity of the charge," said Mark Reichel, one of the defense attorneys involved in the case. "[W]hile the [prosecution] tries to portray the 'conspiracy' as a dangerous and sophisticated military plan, it cannot refute the extensive evidence demonstrating otherwise – from the agent's informing the so-called conspirators that they would need an operational plan; to his providing a map of the region when they couldn't procure a useful one; to his explanation of what GPS was (including that it requires batteries); to the so-called conspirators' inability to finance the operation."

Mr. Philip Smith (Phillip Smith or Phil Smith), General Vang Pao's long-time political, foreign policy and public relations adviser, as well as family friend, urged the U.S. government to drop the charges against Vang Pao and the defendants, especially given Vang Pao's and the Hmong's role in support of U.S. national security interests during the Vietnam War as well as the Lao communist government's egregious human rights violations. According to human rights groups, including Amnesty International, Human Rights Watch, the United League for Democracy in Laos and the Lao Human Rights Council, Laos engaged in military attacks and campaign of starvation against the Hmong people during the period of the alleged coup plot under the current Pathet Lao and Marxist government. Smith and The Center for Public Policy Analysis (CPPA), in cooperation with a bipartisan coalition of Members of the United States Congress organized and co-hosted events in Washington, D.C., Library of Congress and Capitol Hill regarding serious human rights violations in Laos, including special sessions of the U.S. Congressional Forum on Laos where Members of the U.S. Congress and other human rights organizations, human rights advocates, non-governmental organizations (NGOs), and policy experts testified, including Amnesty International, Kerry and Kay Danes, the Lao Veterans of America, Inc. and others.

Smith, the CPPA, Amnesty International, public policy experts and independent journalists provided important research and information to Members of Congress and U.S. and international policymakers in Washington, D.C., regarding the Lao military's persecution and killing of Hmong and Laotian civilians, political asylum seekers and refugees and political and religious dissident groups, including Hmong resistance groups hiding in the jungles and mountains of Laos. Religious freedom issues were also researched and discussed, including the Lao and Socialist Republic of Vietnam security forces persecution, arrest and imprisonment of dissident Laotian and Hmong Christians, Buddhist and animists in Laos. Reports by the United States Commission on International Religious Freedom were discussed regarding religious freedom violations by the Lao and Vietnam-backed Lao military in Laos. Research and information was also provided about the plight of three Hmong-American citizens from St. Paul, Minnesota, including Hakit Yang, who were arrested, and later imprisoned by Lao security forces in Vientiane's notorious Phonthong Prison before they disappeared in Laos.

Philip Smith told the Los Angeles Times, the New York Sun and others that the U.S. Government would be putting itself on trial for betraying the Hmong people, if it proceeded in prosecuting Vang Pao and the other Hmong leaders.

== Dropping of charges ==
On September 18, 2009, the federal government dropped all charges against Vang Pao, saying that "continued prosecution of this defendant is no longer warranted," and announcing in a press release that the federal government was permitted to consider "the probable sentence or other consequences if the person is convicted.”

On January 10, 2011, the federal government dropped all charges against the remaining defendants. "Based on the totality of the circumstances in the case, the government believes, as a discretionary matter, that continued prosecution of defendants is no longer warranted," according to court documents.

== Reaction ==
Vang Pao's arrest and a preliminary decision by a U.S. federal judge to deny bail to Vang Pao and the other defendants sparked huge Hmong protest rallies in California, Minnesota, Wisconsin, and other states.

As of early 2008, pressure built on California Governor Arnold Schwarzenegger and U.S. President George W. Bush to issue pardons in the case, given the defendants' historical alliance with U.S. interests in Southeast Asia.

== See also ==
- Lao Human Rights Council
- United League for Democracy in Laos
- The Center for Public Policy Analysis
- Air America
- Lao Veterans of America
- Vang Pobzeb
- Wat Tham Krabok
- Hmong people
- Amnesty International
- Human rights
- Genocide
- Refugee
- Conspiracy (political)
