= Lao Human Rights Council =

US-based non-profit organization

The Lao Human Rights Council, Inc. (LHRC) is a non-profit, non-partisan, non-governmental (NGO) refugee and human rights organization. It is based nationally, and internationally, with chapters in Colorado, Wisconsin and Minnesota. The Lao Human Rights Council, Inc. researches, and provides information and education regarding the plight of Laotian and Hmong people, and refugees persecuted in Laos, the Socialist Republic of Vietnam and Thailand. It was founded by Dr. Pozbeb Vang, Vang Pobzeb of Greenbay Wisconsin. The Lao Human Rights Council, Inc. is currently headed by Vaughn Vang, an educator, and former political refugee from the Royal Kingdom of Laos, who is a Hmong-American—and who was born, and grew up, in Laos prior to the North Vietnamese invasion of Laos and Marxist takeover in 1975.

== Human rights and refugee work ==
The LHRC researches and educates the public about the plight of Laotian and Hmong refugees seeking political asylum in Thailand and third countries after fleeing the Pathet Lao government's, and Lao People's Army's political persecution, religious persecution and military attacks. The LHRC, and other human rights, and non-governmental organizations, including Amnesty International and Human Rights Watch have raised concerns about the disappearance of political and religious leaders, and civic activists, including Laotian civil society leader Sombath Somphone and others. The LHRC has also raised repeated concerns about Lao People's Army persecution and attacks against minority religious and political dissident groups and unarmed Hmong civilians, including the reported 2013 LPA attack that left four Hmong school teachers dead.

== Efforts on forced repatriation ==
The LHRC and its President, Vaughn Vang, opposed the forced repatriation of some 15,000 ethnic Lao-Hmong refugees from Ban Huay Nam Khao, Petchabun Province, Thailand, from 2007-2010. The LHRC assisted Laotian and Hmong refugees seeking political asylum at the Buddhist temple at Wat Tham Krabok, Thailand.

== See also ==
- Kingdom of Laos
- United League for Democracy in Laos
- The Center for Public Policy Analysis
- Amnesty International
- Human Rights Watch
- Vang Pobzeb
