= Khieo Lapchanh =

Lao activist

- ຂຽວ ລາບຈັນ
- Status: Missing

Khieo Lapchanh (Lao: ຂຽວ ລາບຈັນ) is a Lao activist based in Thailand. In September 2026, Khieo disappeared in Samut Sakhon province.

== Career ==
In 2019, Khieo first entered Thailand and has been working at a restaurant in Samut Sakhon province. After starting to post videos critical of the Lao government on his "Khiew Channel" on Facebook, he began to receive threats, and subsequently requested asylum.

=== Disappearance ===
Khieo disappeared on 15 September 2026 while traveling to his apartment in Samut Sakhon province a day before his registration interview with the United Nations Refugee Agency in Bangkok.

Emilie Palamy Pradichit, founder and executive director of the Manushya Foundation, said in a statement that Khieo's disappearance was likely an instance of transnational repression, writing "Digital transnational repression does not stay confined to digital space. It can expose activists to physical danger," adding "Khieo had already stopped speaking out online because he feared for his life. Now he is missing."

== See also ==
- Od Sayavong, Lao activist who disappeared in 2019 whilst seeking refuge in Thailand
- Bounsuan Kitiyano, Lao activist killed in May 2023 in Ubon Ratchathani province
