= Sisay Luangmonda =

Laotian human rights activist (1994–2026)

- ສີໄຊ ເລືອງມອນທ່າ
- Born: 21 October 1994; Samtay district, Houaphanh province, Laos
- Died: February 14, 2026 (aged 31); Hadxayfong district, Vientiane, Laos
- Occupation: Human rights activist
- Notable work: Criticisms of corruption in the Laotian government

Sisay Luangmonda (Lao: ສີໄຊ ເລືອງມອນທ່າ; 21 October 1994 – February 2026), known online as Bao Mo Khaen or Mr. Khaen (Lao: ຫມໍແຄນ), was a Laotian human rights activist. Known for his criticisms of the ruling Lao People's Revolutionary Party, which he largely made on a public Facebook page, Sisay was forcibly disappeared on 14 February 2026; his body was found six days later in a rural area near Vientiane.

== Activism ==
Sisay was born on 21 October 1994 in the Samtay district of Houaphanh province, in eastern Laos.

Sisay became known for his criticisms of state corruption within the LPRP government, which he primarily made on social media accounts, including Facebook, under the names Bao Mo Khaen or simply Mr. Khaen. At the time of his disappearance, his "Mr. Khaen" Facebook page had over 60, 000 followers. Popular posts by Sisay included reports as well as his own experiences of bureaucratic bribery, including at hospitals and other state institutions. He also criticised the government's treatment of veterans, including delays to the payment of their benefits, as well as its intolerance of freedom of expression by activists and dissidents. Sisay posted videos in which he satirised prominent Laotian politicians and political slogans. As a result of his popularity, Sisay was described as an "influential critic of the government" by the French newspaper Le Monde.

== Disappearance and death ==
Sisay received death threats from pro-government Facebook accounts, and in September 2025 uploaded a video he described as his "final message", stating that if he did not post for three consecutive days, then he had likely been killed. Earlier that year, he had been summoned to receive "legal training" at the Houaphanh Provincial Centre; in January 2026, he moved to Vientiane, the Laotian capital, citing concerns for his safety. The following month, Sisay applied for a temporary border pass to enter Thailand; the request was denied by Laotian authorities, who alleged he had provided "incomplete documentation".

On 16 February 2026, Sisay was reported missing by members of his family after he had not been seen or heard from. His neighbours subsequently reported that they had seen him being arrested by soldiers between 21:00 and 22:00 ICT and transported to Phonthan Prison. Laotian authorities dismissed claims that he had been arrested, arbitrarily detained, or subjected to an enforced disappearance.

On 20 February 2026, a body was found by members of Vientiane Rescue 1624 by the side of a road in a forested area near the village of Dong-phonhae in Hadxayfong district, Vientiane. The body was found close to a motorcycle and a bag containing beef jerky and alcohol. On 21 February, the body was identified as being that of Sisay. The following day, parliamentary elections were held in Laos.

Sisay's funeral was held on 23 February 2026. Later that day, Bounthavy Laoin, the head of Houay Teuy village in Xaythany District, issued a letter of certification alleging that Sisay was still alive, and that claims by his family that he had been abducted and killed by Laotian officers were "without merit" and "completely false". The following day, he released a further statement acknowledging that Sisay was dead, blaming his previous allegation as being based on a "misunderstanding".

== Response ==
Sisay's family expressed concern that Laotian authorities had not investigated Sisay's disappearance, nor his death after his body was found.

The New York-based human rights organisation Human Rights Watch called on Laotian authorities to "immediately and impartially" investigate Sisay's death, describing his killing as sending a "spine-chilling message" to critics of the Laotian government. The Manushya Foundation reported that Sisay's death reflected the "intimidation, disappearance, and deadly consequences" faced by dissidents living in Laos, noting other activists who had been found deceased in apparent motorcycle accidents after criticising the government. It called for an investigation into his death and expressed solidarity with Sisay's family and other activists. The Diplomat reported that the elections had been "stained" by Luangmonda's death. The Diplomat described Luangmonda's death as a "normative feature" of the Lao People's Revolutionary Party's efforts to "impose fear" on the Laotian people.

== See also ==
- Anousa Luangsuphom, a Laotian blogger who was shot in an assassination attempt in 2023.
- Sombath Somphone, a Laotian human rights activist who disappeared in 2012.
