= Sombath =

Sombath is a given name and surname. Notable people with the name include:

- Alice Sombath (born 2003), French footballer
- Sombath Somphone (born 1952), Lao community development worker
