= United League for Democracy in Laos =

US-based activist organization

The United League for Democracy in Laos, Inc. (ULDL) is a non-profit, non-governmental organization (NGO) based in the Washington, D.C.-area with chapters and members in the United States, Thailand, and Laos. The ULDL has worked to provide information about developments in Laos regarding civil society, human rights, pro-democracy, religious freedom, political prisoners, and environmental issues.

== Promoting civil society, human rights, and religious freedom issues in Laos and Vietnam ==
The ULDL has issued several international appeals and statements urging the Laos government and the government of Vietnam to abide by international human rights law and to release political and religious dissidents and opposition leaders.

In 2011, the ULDL raised concerns about the religious persecution in Southeast Asia and the killing of Lao and Hmong dissident and independent Christians, Buddhists and Animist religious believers by Lao People's Army and Vietnam People's Army troops.

Khampet Moukdarath, a former political prisoner in Laos, who spend years under harsh conditions in a reeducation camp in the Lao gulag system in Northeastern Laos was a prominent leader in the ULDL prior to his death in 2011. Khampet Moukdarath repeatedly testified and presented research and evidence of ongoing human rights violations, and religious persecution and freedom violations, in Laos, at the U.S. Congressional Forum on Laos in the 1990s thru 2010.

The ULDL and its President Bounthanh Rathigna have provided information to and urged the US Commission on International Religious Freedom (USCIRF) to investigate ongoing religious persecution and religious freedom violations in Laos and to officially designated Laos as a Country of Particular Concern (CPC). In 2003, Laotian- and Hmong-Americans lauded the USCIRF's efforts in officially designating Laos as a CPC violator of international norms of religious freedom for its persecution of independent and dissident Lao and Hmong Christians, Catholic, Animist and Buddhist religious believers.

== Concerns about Lao Students for Democracy leaders arrested and imprisoned in Laos ==
The ULDL has urged the government of Laos, and the Lao People's Army to honor human rights norms and to release opposition leaders and groups who have challenged the Pathet Lao government's persecution and imprisonment of dissidents, including the Lao Students for Democracy Movement of October 1999, who were arrested by police, army and security forces in October 1999 in Vientiane, Laos, during peaceful pro-democracy and human rights rallies.

The ULDL has also urged the Lao government to abide by resolutions passed by the European Parliament and US Congress regarding human rights violations in Laos.

The ULDL has urged the government of Laos to release the Lao Students Movement for Democracy leaders who continue to be imprisoned in Laos.

== Expressing concern for political prisoners and the plight of Ban Vang Tao opposition dissidents during Laos–Thailand cross-border raid ==
The ULDL played a leadership role in advocating for Laotian opposition and dissident leaders involved in the Ban Vang Tao cross-border raid along the Laos - Thailand border that followed the earlier military crackdown on the peaceful Lao Students for Democracy demonstrations in Vientiane, Laos in October 1999. The ULDL opposed the forced repatriation of the dissidents and alleged rebels and their imprisonment in Thailand and extrajudicial killing in Laos by Lao security forces.

== Testimony in the U.S. Congress and the U.S. Congressional Forum on Laos ==
The ULDL, and its President Mr. Bounthanh Rathigna, presented testimony at the U.S. Congressional Forum on Laos about human rights violations in Laos and the plight of Hmong refugees facing forced repatriation from Thailand to the Marxist government in Laos that they fled.

== Organizing human rights and pro-democracy demonstrations at the Lao Embassy in Washington, D.C. ==
The ULDL has organized numerous human rights and pro-democracy demonstrations and rallies in front of the Lao Embassy in Washington, D.C., including rallies in support of Laotian and Hmong refugees, and the persecution of the Hmong people

== Urging Lao Government to release civil activist Sombath Somphone and Laotian political prisoners ==
The United League for Democracy in Laos, joined other NGOs, human rights advocates, and non-profit organizations, including Amnesty International and Human Rights Watch in appealing to the Pathet Lao government in Laos to release civil activist and civil society leader Sombath Somphone who was arrested in Vientiane, Laos in December 2012 by Lao police and security forces.

In 2014, the ULDL joined with the Center for Public Policy Analysis, and the Paris, France-based Lao Movement for Human Rights (LMHR) as well as other NGO organizations to urge the United Nations to press the government of Laos to release Sombath Somphone and other Laotian and Hmong political and religious dissidents, including those suffering religious freedom violations in Laos. The ULDL and NGOs raised also raised concerns about the Lao Marxist government's failure to release members of the Lao Students Movement for Democracy who were arrested following peaceful protests in Vientiane in October 1999. The human rights groups urged the Lao government to release these and other political prisoners and imprisoned Hmong refugees.

== See also ==
- Kidlat Tahimik
- Jay Landers
- Philippines
- ABS-CBN
- List of programs aired by ABS-CBN
- Studio 23
- AMCARA Broadcasting Network
- List of programs aired by Studio 23
- List of ABS-CBN Broadcasting Corporation slogans
- ABS-CBN Regional
- Cebu
- Cebu IT Park
- Ayala Center Cebu
- Sohag governorate
- Human Rights
- Refugees
- Political prisoners
- Sombath Somphone
- The Centre for Public Policy Analysis
- Amnesty International
- Human Rights Watch
- Lao Human Rights Council
- Pathet Lao
- Laos
- Vietnam
- Phonthong Prison
- Kingdom of Laos
- Transparency International
- Kerry and Kay Danes
- Lao People's Army
- Vietnam People's Army
- Lao Veterans of America
- Hmong people
- US Commission on International Religious Freedom
