= Anousa Luangsuphom =

Laotian human rights activist (c.1998)

Anousa "Jack" Luangsuphom (Lao: ອານຸຊາ 'ແຈັກ' ຫຼວງສຸພັນ; born c. 1998) is a Laotian human rights activist who is described as one of the few well-known critics of the government of Laos, who uses two Facebook groups to report on corruption and human rights abuses in the country and to call for democratic reforms.

== Activism ==
Luangsuphom is a native of Chanthabuly, Vientiane.

Luangsuphom primarily uses Facebook in order to report on human rights abuses in Laos, and regularly calls for the end of one-party rule in the country; the Lao People's Revolutionary Party is the founding and sole ruling party of Laos. Luangsuphom is critical of the political relationship between Laos and China, which he feels had led to worsening living situations for Laotian citizens, while making the government richer. He also regularly posts on issues including air pollution; rights to education; and LGBT rights.

Luangsuphom ran two Facebook groups: "Kub Khuean Duay Keyboard" (English: "driven by the keyboard"), which had 43, 000 members as of May 2023; and "Sor Tor Lor - the Republic", which had 6000 members. The Diplomat reported that the groups' accumulative membership was "significant" given Laos' size and relatively low levels of internet penetration; in addition, all newspapers in the country are published by the government. As a result of his activism, Human Rights Watch called Luangsuphom "one of the few people in Laos who regularly and openly expressed views that were critical of the government".

== Shooting ==
On 29 April 2023, Luangsuphom was shot in the face and chest by a masked gunman at After School Chocolate and Bar, a coffee shop in Chanthabouly, Vientiane; the attack was recorded on CCTV. He was originally reported to have died while being transported to a 150-bed hospital.

Following Luangsuphom's shooting, "Kub Kluen Duay Keyboard" promoted the use of the hashtag "ແຈັກຕ້ອງບໍ່ຕາຍຟຣີ" (English: "Justice for Jack") to call on a thorough investigation from the Laotian government.

Luangsuphom's perceived death was criticized internationally by Human Rights Watch, and Amnesty International, who called on the Laotian government to investigate. His shooting has been linked to the disappearance of other human rights activists in Laos like Sombath Somphone and Odd Sayavong.

On 4 May, his family released a statement stating that he survived the shooting, and only reported his death to avoid him being targeted again.

As of 12 May 2023, he had left Laos for medical treatment, and for his personal safety.

As of 2025, Genocide Watch condemned his attempted assassination.

== See also ==
- Sombath Somphone
- Houayheuang Xayabouly
- Sivanxai Phommalath
- Sisay Luangmonda
