= Vang Pobzeb =

Vang Pobzeb (RPA: Pob Zeb Vaj, Pahawh: 𖬒𖬰𖬪𖬵 𖬈𖬰𖬥𖬰 𖬖𖬰𖬜; July 12, 1957 – August 23, 2005) was a Hmong American dedicated to Lao and Hmong human rights. For over 25 years, he was an outspoken critic of the Marxist governments of the Pathet Lao in Laos and the Socialist Republic of Vietnam (SRV) and their human rights violations, religious freedom violations, and persecution of the Lao and Hmong people.

== Early life ==
Vang was born in Laos on July 12, 1957. He later moved to the United States and received his PhD in international relations from the University of Colorado Denver with a focus on world politics and Asian security, refugee and human rights issues. Vang was fluent in the languages of Hmong Daw (White Hmong), Mong Njua (Green Hmong), Laotian, English and was able to speak and read some French.

== Career ==
Vang was responsible for the United Nations's recognition of the word Hmong as the proper term for the Hmong people. Additionally, he testified in the United States Congress, and at the United Nations in New York City and Geneva on numerous occasions on the Hmong genocide in Laos.

Vang founded and served as the first president and executive director of the non-governmental organization Lao Human Rights Council. Vang also founded the Hmong American United Students Association in Eau Claire, Wisconsin in April 1981. In September 1986, he was appointed to form and chair the Hmong Council Education Committee.

In the 1980s and 1990s, Vang worked with Philip Smith and The Center for Public Policy Analysis in Washington, D.C., to research and obtain additional evidence of human rights violations in Laos as well as the forced repatriation of Laotian and Hmong refugees from Thailand back to the communist regime in Laos they fled. Vang frequently traveled to Southeast Asia, including Thailand, and Washington, D.C., to conduct research and public policy advocacy—and to meet with policymakers and Members of the U.S. Congress. This information was often shared with key members of the U.S. Congress and policymakers in Washington, D.C., who eventually worked to try and halted, and reverse, the forced repatriation of Lao and Hmong refugees from Thailand back to Laos, including the thousands of Hmong refugees who fled to the Buddhist Temple of Wat Tham Krabok. Many of these Southeast Asian refugees, and asylum seekers, were eventually resettled in the United States as a result of the work of Vang, Philip Smith, The Centre for Public Policy Analysis, the Lao Veterans of America, the United League for Democracy in Laos and others, to reverse the forced repatriation policy directed against Laotian and Hmong refugees who had fled political persecution from communist Laos to Thailand. In a paper published in 1990, Vang wrote that Laos was colonial territory of Vietnam since 2 December 1975 and was directed by Vietnam in its internal and external affairs.

According to Smith and The Centre for Public Policy Analysis, in the 1990s and early 2000s, Vang and the Lao Human Rights Council helped to raise awareness and provide research and information about military attacks and human rights violations in Laos by Pathet Lao forces, the Lao People's Army and the Vietnam People's Army. Much of this information was confirmed by Amnesty International and other human rights organizations as well as independent journalists.

== Death and recognition ==
Vang died in Saint Paul, Minnesota on August 23, 2005. He was recognized posthumously on September 22, 2005 by the Wisconsin Senate for his work assisting the Hmong and Laotian community.
