= Houayheuang Xayabouly =

Laotian environmental and human rights activist

- Born: Houayheuang Xayabouly; November 4, 1988 (age 37); Phonthong District, Champassak Province
- Occupation: Activist

Houayheuang "Muay" Xayabouly (born November 4, 1988) is a Laotian environmental and human rights activist. She is currently serving a 5 year prison sentence for criminal defamation and distributing anti-state propaganda. Her case has been taken by journalists as characteristic for the repressive climate of Laos's regime.

== Life ==
Muay was born on November 4, 1988, in Phonthong District, Champassak Province, as the third child and only daughter of wealthy parents. After studying tourism, she started working as a tour guide. She also opened a shop for traditional clothes.

Muay's activism began in 2017, when she posted a Facebook video about a new toll being charged to cross a bridge connecting Laos with Thailand, especially about connections between the company that had built the bridge and the Laotian government. In response, the government held a press conference where it announced no more tolls would be collected, but the construction company did not change the collection practices. In 2018, she again posted a video about the buying and selling of official positions, taking her brother's case as an example. She organised a concert protesting against this corruption, which took place on October 15, 2018, in Savannakhet, but was shut down by police. Following these posts, she was fired from her job as a tour guide due to government pressure on her employer.

She then began posting about the harsh competition Laotian businesses faced from Chinese competitors. She especially highlighted the selling of land to Chinese enterprises for the construction of banana plantations, which affected the large portion of the Laotian population that depends on agriculture. She also criticised the labour conditions on these plantations, where the contamination of land by chemicals, including Prochloraz, led to water becoming undrinkable and land inarable. In response, the Laotian government announced that citizens who spread untrue information on social media would be prosecuted.

Following the 2018 collapse of a dam that killed at least 40 people and displaced 6,600, Muay posted videos from IDP camps in Champassak Province despite tight government restrictions on informations regarding the disaster. She criticised the slow government response and the failure to use the available aid money.

In late August and early September 2019, the same region suffered again severe floods. On September 5, Muay posted a 17-minute long video to Facebook Live in which the criticised the slow government response to the disaster. The video was viewed 500,000 times. On September 12, she was arrested, without warrant, while eating at a restaurant. She had been arrested before. During detention at Phonthong police station, police forced her to confess that she was guilty of defamation against the Laotian state and ruling party under Article 117 of the Laotian Criminal Code.

Muay was denied bail and visitors. Independent monitoring of prison conditions was also prohibited. She was tried and found guilty on 22 November 2019. She was sentenced to a money fine and five years in prison, for which she was moved to Champassak Provincial Prison. The NGOs Manushya Foundation and US-based Human Rights Foundation as well as Thai student organisation Humanity Beyond Borders condemned the proceedings against Muay and filed a report concerning her imprisonment to the United Nations Working Group on Arbitrary Detention in December 2020. Reporters without Borders, the International Federation of Journalists, the International Federation for Human Rights and the United Nations Special Rapporteur on Human Rights Defenders also expressed concern.

== See also ==
- Sombath Somphone
- Sivanxai Phommalath
- Anousa Luangsuphom
