= Sivanxai Phommalath =

Laotian activist

Sivanxai Phommalath is a vegetable vendor who became an activist in Laos. She was jailed for protesting the Government of Laos seizing her land for development.

== Biography ==
Sivanxai Phommalath was a small vegetable vendor who sold vegetables grown in her own garden by her house in Yommalath district, Khammuane province, Laos. She was married with one child. The government of Laos decided to build Nam Theun II dam in Yommalath district to generate hydroelectricity. Her home and land was expropriated by the Government of Laos, like many of her neighbors. Those with connections to the government were able to secure good compensation, which Phommalath was not able to do. She received 900 dollars for her land and the government said that it was enough to cover another piece of land she owned near the site. She demanded fair compensation that was market price of the land.

After Phommalath was not given fair compensation for her land, she tried to organize a protest near the border of Thailand, which did not work. No one showed up at the meeting place on a bridge over the Mekong River. Once her group arrived home, they were arrested and imprisoned in Thamkhikai. The police accused her of causing public disturbance and was asked to name the government official she meant to meet at the border which she did not know. After one night in jail, the other villagers were released but Phommalath was not set free. Still, she was also not charged or sentenced. She was held in this prison for nearly three months before being fined 700,000 kips (88 dollars) and then released. After being released from jail, she decided to fight the government and settled down on her second plot, building a house and paying property taxes.

== See also ==
- Sombath Somphone
- Houayheuang Xayabouly
- Anousa Luangsuphom
