= Od Sayavong =

Lao human rights activist (1985–)

- Born: 16 January 1985; Savannakhet, Laos
- Status: Missing for 7 years, 1 month and 11 days
- Died: c. 26 August 2019 (aged 34); Unknown. Possibly Bangkok, Thailand
- Known for: Victim of enforced disappearance Human rights ACTIVIST

Od Sayavong (Lao: ອັອດ ໄຊຍະວົງ; born 16 January 1985) is a Lao human rights and pro-democracy activist who disappeared on 26 August 2019 whilst seeking refuge in Thailand, in what has widely been reported as being an enforced disappearance. Od has not been seen since.

== Biography ==
Od was born and raised in Savannakhet, Laos. He has been a pro-democracy activist since at least 2015 and was a prominent critic of the Lao government within the country before seeking refuge in Thailand, becoming officially recognised as a refugee by the United Nations High Commissioner for Refugees. At the time of his disappearance, Od was living in Bangkok and awaiting resettlement in a third country.

While in Thailand, Od joined Free Lao, an organisation of Lao migrant workers as well as exiled activists, based in Bangkok and its surrounding provinces. As part of his activism with Free Lao, Od took part in peaceful protests outside the Lao embassy and United Nations headquarters in Bangkok. He also led human rights workshops with Laotians living throughout Thailand.

In March 2019, Od met with Philip Alston, the UN special rapporteur on extreme poverty and human rights, in Bangkok, whilst wearing a shirt with an image of the flag of the Kingdom of Laos, an image which is outlawed in Laos itself. On 16 June 2019, Od took part in a public protest calling for an international investigation into the 2012 disappearance of Sombath Somphone, as well as justice for Laotians impacted by government land grabs, dam collapses and intolerance of human rights activism. Shortly before his disappearance, he posted a video online critical of the Lao government during an ASEAN meeting in Bangkok.

== Disappearance ==
Od was last seen on the morning of 26 August 2019 when a neighbour saw him leaving his flat in the Bueng Kum district in his work uniform. At 18:34 that day, he messaged his housemate on Facebook Messenger stating he was on his way home for dinner and that he would stop by a shop to buy some food on his journey. Od did not return home that night and did not respond to phone calls made into the following day; his phone stopped connecting on the evening of 27 August. On 2 September 2019, Od's friends filed a missing person report with the Royal Thai Police.

=== Response ===
Following Od's disappearance, members of Free Lao told Human Rights Watch that they had been put under surveillance and intimidated by both Thai and Lao authorities in the preceding weeks. On 6 September 2023, a spokesperson for the Thai Ministry of Defence denied that the government had any knowledge of Od's whereabouts. Shortly after his disappearance, images on social media suggested that Od's body had been found in the Mekong, though these were subsequently debunked.

The International Federation for Human Rights and the Lao Movement for Human Rights issued a joint statement calling on the Thai government to investigate Od's disappearance. Civicus accused the Lao government of being involved in Od's disappearance, while Human Rights Watch released a statement criticising the Thai government for "deferring" to Laos over its international legal obligation to protect dissidents living within its borders as refugees.

In October 2019, United Nations human rights experts from the Working Group on Enforced or Involuntary Disappearances voiced their concerns to the governments of Laos and Thailand around Od's disappearance. Special rapporteur Philip Alston, who had met with Od earlier in 2019, queried whether Od's disappearance was linked to his public engagement with United Nations services. Michael Forst, the special rapporteur on human rights defenders, described Od as a "vocal advocate on human rights, corruption, and environmental issues", while the High Commissioner for Refugees listed Od as a "person of concern" citing the link between Od's activism and his disappearance.

In August 2020, a year after his disappearance, the Royal Thai Police stated that there had been no further progress in their investigation.

== See also ==
- List of people who disappeared mysteriously (2000–present)
- Sombath Somphone: a Lao community development worker who disappeared in 2012
- Khieo Lapchanh: a Lao activist who disappeared in Thailand in 2026
