= Hmong people =

Ethnic group in southwest China and Southeast Asia

- A choropleth map for countries with over 500 Hmong residents

Total population
- 5 million

Regions with significant populations
- China: 2,777,039 (2000, estimate) (Note: There is no official census of the Hmong people in China, as they are classified as a subgroup of the Miao people there.)
- Vietnam: 1,393,547 (2019)
- Laos: 743,525 (2025)
- United States: 368,609 (2021)
- Thailand: 250,070 (2015)
- France: 15,000
- Australia: 3,438 (2011)
- Myanmar: 3,000 (2010)
- France (French Guiana): 2,000 (2001)
- Canada: 1,000 (2005)
- Argentina: 600 (1999)
- Germany: 500

Languages
- Hmong, Mandarin, Vietnamese, Lao, English

Religion
- Shamanism • Christianity • Buddhism• Islam

The Hmong people (Hmong pronunciation: [m̥ɔ̃́]; RPA: Hmoob; Hmong Dô: Hmôngz; Nyiakeng Puachue Hmong: 𞄀𞄩𞄰; Pahawh Hmong: 𖬌𖬣𖬵; Chinese: 苗族蒙人) are an ethnic group from East and Southeast Asia. In China, the Hmong people are classified as a sub-group of the Miao people. The modern Hmong reside mainly in Southwestern China and Mainland Southeast Asian countries, such as Vietnam, Laos, Thailand, and Myanmar. There are also diaspora communities in the United States, Australia, France, and South America.

== Etymology ==
The term Hmong is the English spelling of the Hmong people's native name. It is a singular and a plural noun similar to "Japanese" and "French". Very little is known about the Hmong people's native name, as it is not mentioned in Chinese historical records, in which the Hmong are identified as Miao. Its meaning is debatable, and its origin is uncertain, though it can be traced to several provinces in China. However, Hmong Americans and Hmong Laotians often associate it with 'free' or 'fate' (hmoov); it serves as a reminder to them of their history of fighting oppression.

Before the 1970s, the term Miao ('barbarians', 'wild', 'seedlings', or 'sons of the soil'), also spelled Meo, was used in reference to the Hmong. In the 1970s, Yang Dao, a Hmong-American scholar, who at the time was the head of the Human Resource Department of the Ministry of Planning in the Royal Lao Government of Kingdom of Laos, advocated for the term Hmong with the support of clan leaders and then-leader Vang Pao. Dao insisted that both Meo and Miao were unacceptable, as his people had always called themselves by the name "Hmong" (which he defined as "free men"). Surrounding countries began to use the term Hmong after the United States Department of State used it for immigration screening in Thailand's Ban Vinai Refugee Camp. In 1994, Vang Pobzeb registered the term Hmong with the United Nations, making it the proper term to identify the Hmong people internationally. Soon after, there was a political push from Hmong-American politicians and activists to replace the term Miao with the term Hmong in China with little to no success.

== Relationship to the Miao ==
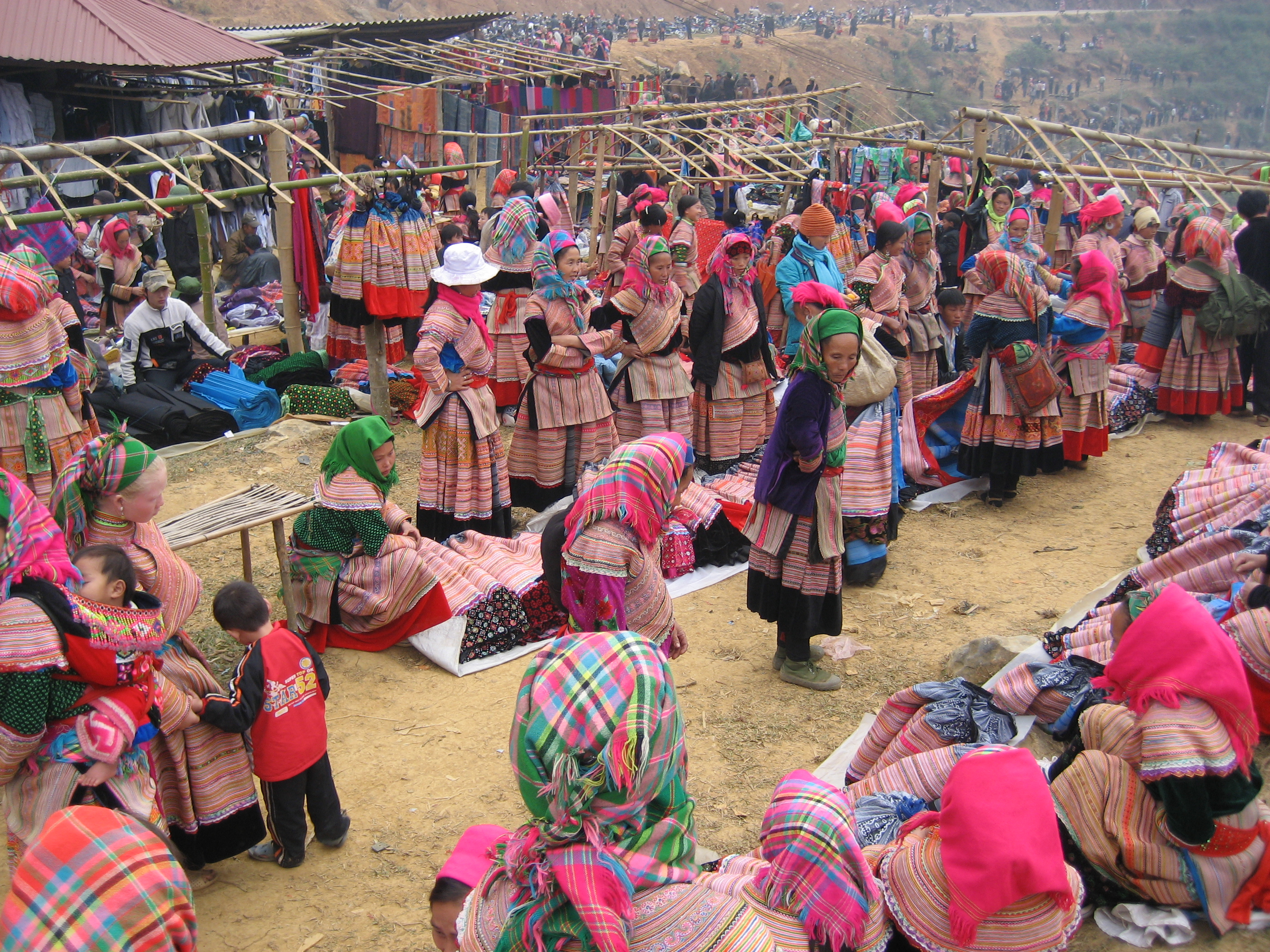
Hmong people at the Can Cau market, Si Ma Cai, Vietnam

=== Historical Miao ===
Historically, the term "Hmong" is not featured in any Chinese text, only the term "Miao". However it is uncertain if all mentions of Miao people referred to the Hmong people. According to Ruey (1962), the way in which Miao was used in Chinese can roughly be divided into three periods: a legendary period from 2300 BC to 200 BC, then a period when the term generally referred to southern barbarians until 1200 AD, and then a modern period during which the Hmong were probably included. Although the term appeared before the Qin dynasty (221 BC), throughout history Miao was used as a loose and general term by the Han to refer to southern barbarians. Only since the Tang dynasty did more evidence of its association with the Hmong become more apparent. In the 20th century, Western missionaries called the Hmong and Hmao the "Big Flowery Miao" (Da Hua Miao) and the "Little Flowery Miao" (Xiao Hua Miao). Another source states that the Green and White Miao were the Hmong, the Flowery Miao were the Hmao, the Black Miao were the Hmu, and the Red Miao were the Xong. According to She Miaojun, the Miao only existed as an exonym in the imagination of outsiders all the way up to the Qing dynasty. It did not refer to any self-defined ethnic group united by either territory or language. Others believe that Miao identity emerged during the rebellions of the 18th and 19th centuries.

=== Miao nationality ===
Today, the Hmong in China are categorized under the umbrella term Miáo (苗) along with three other indigenous cultural groups, which include non-Hmong peoples such as the Hmu and the Xong of southeast Guizhou. The Chinese Miao minority was created in 1949 as part of the ethnic identification project in which members of the ethnic groups that now comprise the Miao umbrella group campaigned for identification under the name Miao—taking advantage of its familiarity and associations of historical political oppression. The push to appropriate Miao as the official name of their minzu nationality received significant contributions from three Miao intellectuals, however none of them were Hmong. The various Miao sub-groups freely identify as Miao or Chinese while reserving their specific ethnonyms for intra-ethnic communication. According to Jacques Lemoine, "Chinese Hmong have the Miao nationality but Hmong ethnicity" because the People's Republic of China does not recognize ethnicity.

The Miao minority group has been described as extremely heterogeneous. The four main groups classified as Miao in China are the Hmong, Hmao, Hmu, and the Xong. Despite speaking related languages belonging to the Hmongic language group, these four ethnic groups have little in common and their languages are mutually unintelligible. Even the group closest to the Hmong, the Hmao, speak a language that is as different from Hmong as Italian is from French. They diverged significantly as early as a thousand years ago, after which they may have had no relation to each other at all. Without their official classification as the Miao minority after 1949, it is unlikely that they would be able to recognize any affinity with each other. However none of the four groups have obtained official status as distinct minorities in China. Their names are generally unrecognized by the Chinese and are only used as part of the local vernacular language. As a result, only a small portion of the modern Miao people initially identified as Hmong.

The cumbersome umbrella term "Miao" refers to a number of disparate groups totaling 7.5 million people as of 1990, speaking three mutually unintelligible dialects and scattered over seven provinces in southwest China... These multiple sub-groups have been variously divided into large aggregates such as the Black, Red, Blue, White, and Flowery groups, or later the Eastern, Central or Western dialect groups. It was only in the Maoist period, with the national implementation of identification policies... that the diverse Miao in China came to recognize each other as co-ethnics and to identify with and operate under the ethnonym "Miao." Only a portion of those identified as Miao—the ones distributed over western Guizhou and parts of Yunnan, particularly the border areas—call themselves "Hmong" in their own language.

— Louisa Schein

The non-equivalence between the Miao and the Hmong was acknowledged in interactions between Hmong refugees and the Miao. The Miao people that Hmong travelers from the West met were highly varied both in their language and cultural practices. When Hmong refugees from France and the U.S. initially made contact with the Miao from China in officially sanctioned visits, they were introduced to the Xong Miao people who were neither Hmong nor spoke the Hmong language. An eyewitness recounts several occasions when a Hmong and a Hmao tried to understand each other's languages without success. They also met an assortment of Miao people who no longer spoke their native language and only knew Chinese. Many of the Miao they met did not share the same traditional clothing, myths, and folktales. Some did not even play the lusheng, a traditional Hmong musical instrument. The visiting Hmong were themselves not from China but Southeast Asia, where their ancestors had migrated over a century ago due to conflicts in the Qing dynasty. Not understanding the differences between the Miao and Hmong, initially some Hmong-Americans did not believe that these were real Miao people, but other ethnic groups. Some thought that the different costumes were the result of lost traditions among the Southeast Asian Hmong.

Some Hmong went further to seek out "really Hmong" people through unofficial channels with whom they could speak Hmong to. However even after successfully finding them, they found that there were dialect variations that differed from the Hmong that they grew up speaking. As Hmong refugees discovered the differences between themselves and the Chinese Miao, some non-Hmong Miao people such as the Hmu started referring to themselves as Hmong to express nationalistic sentiments. Contributing to this trend is the tendency of professional linguists to use the names of smaller ethnic groups to refer to the broader categories such as Hmong–Mien languages rather than Miao-Yao languages. This is due to the outsized influence of groups outside of Asia such as the Hmong and Mien who are able to articulate their cause, thereby affecting some proto-nationalistic movements within the Miao to identify as Hmong despite not actually being Hmong.

=== Hmong/Miao identity ===
Miao or Meo carried strong pejorative connotations in both China and Southeast Asia. It was more so a stereotype such as uncivilized, uncooperative, uncultivated, harmful, and inhumane than a name of an ethnic group and was used in daily conversations as an expression for ugliness and primitiveness. Due to these negative connotations, the Hmong promote the use of Hmong as a replacement for Miao. In modern times, however, Miao has lost such negative connotations in China and has since been officially recognized as an ethnicity, which includes the Hmong. The Hmong in China are often happy or proud to be known as Miao while most Hmong outside China find it offensive. According to Louisa Schein, Miao is a neutral ethnonym within China and the only term that encompasses all its subgroups.

According to Gary Yia Lee writing in the Hmong Studies Journal, the choice to identify as Miao was a deliberate and strategic decision its members advocated for in recognition of its potential benefits. Rather than being split into multiple smaller groups with short and murky histories, the Miao chose to adopt one ethno-name representing 9.2 million people claiming a long history dating back to ancient China. Their larger population granted them the strength and support befitting of the fifth largest nationality in China. In addition, by claiming kinship to the San Miao referred to in ancient Chinese history, they positioned themselves as pre-existing inhabitants of China prior to the arrival of the Han, imparting a "legendary stature to the present-day Miao" that "bestows the dignity of great antiquity, authoritativeness and a firm standing in the documentary record".

Contemporary transnational interactions between Hmong in the West and Miao groups in China, following the 1975 Hmong emigration, led to the development of a global Hmong identity that includes linguistically and culturally related minorities in China with no previous ethnic affiliation. In 1994, a Miao woman from China was chosen as the winner of the Miss Hmong Beauty Pageant in Fresno, California. Costume styles were imported from China and used in festivals. Scholarly and commercial exchanges, increasingly made over the internet, have also resulted in an exchange of terminology, including some Hmong people accepting the designation Miao after visiting China and some nationalist non-Hmong Miao peoples identifying as Hmong.

In Southeast Asia, Hmong people are referred to by other names, including: Vietnamese Mèo, Mông or H'Mông; Lao Maew (ແມ້ວ) or Mong (ມົ້ງ); Thai Maew (แม้ว) or Mong (ม้ง); and Burmese mun lu-myo (မုံလူမျိုး). With a slight change in accent, the word "Meo" in Lao and Thai can be pronounced to mean "cat"; while Vietnamese Mèo directly means "cat". The term Maew and Meo derived from the term Miao.

== Origins ==
=== Genetic origins ===
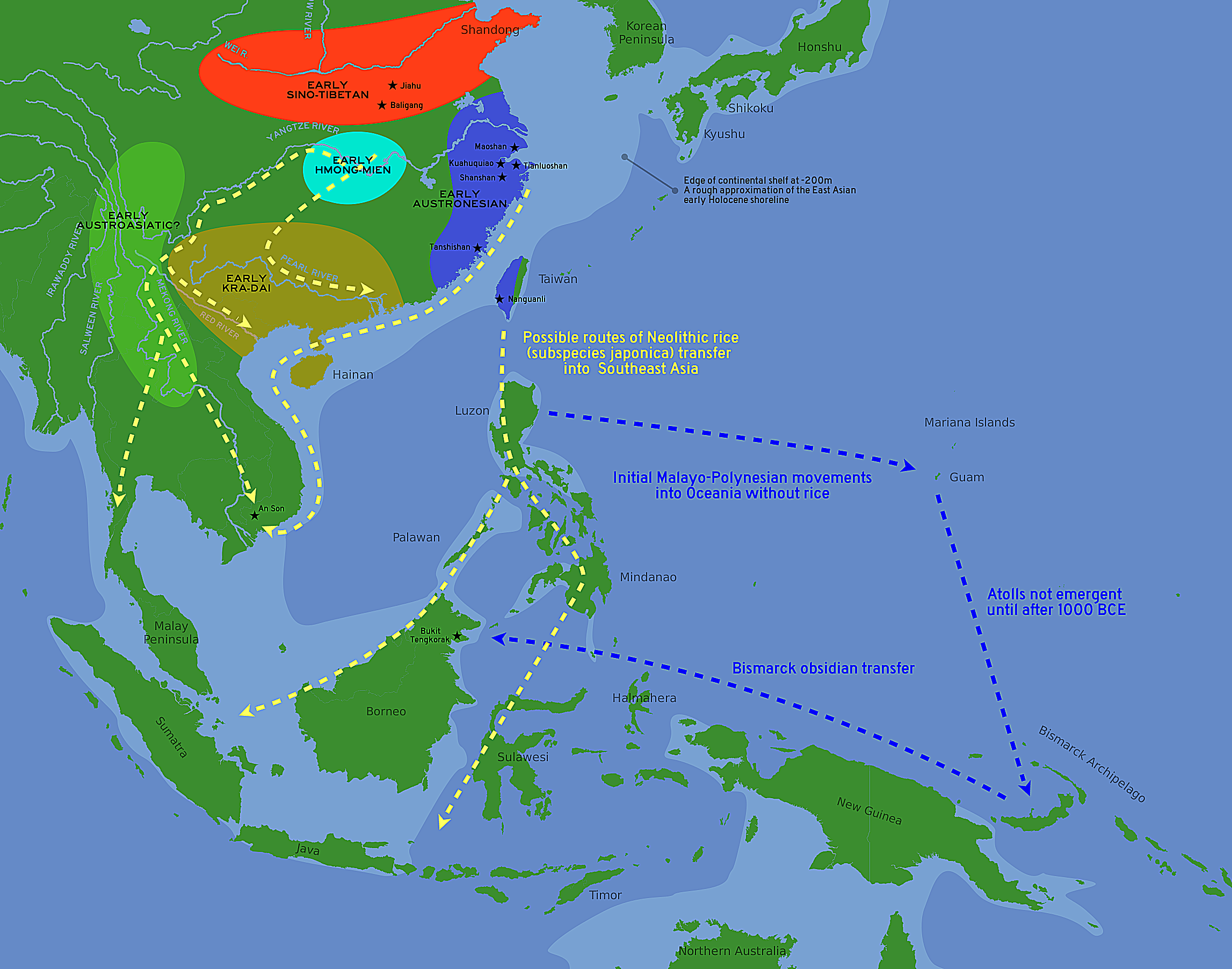
Likely routes of early rice transfer, and possible language family homelands (archaeological sites in China and SE Asia shown)

A DNA study in 2005 in Thailand found that Hmong paternal lineage is quite different from lu Mien and other Southeast Asian tribes. The Hmong–Mien and Sino-Tibetan speaking people are known as hill tribes in Thailand; they were the subject of the first studies to show an impact of patrilocality vs. matrilocality on patterns of Mitochondrial DNA vs. the male-specific portion of the Y chromosome (MSY) variation. According to linguist Martha Ratliff, there is linguistic evidence to suggest that they have occupied some of the same areas of southern China for over 8,000 years. Evidence from mitochondrial DNA in Hmong–Mien–speaking populations supports the existence of southern origins of maternal lineages even further back in time, although it has been shown that Hmong-speaking populations had comparatively more contact with northern East Asians than had the Mien. A 2020 study, however, states that Hmong in Thailand cluster with other Hmong groups only due to their practice of endogamy.

In 2011, Hmong DNA was sampled and found to contain 7.84% D-M15 and 6% N(Tat) DNA. The research found a common ancestry between Hmong–Mien peoples and Mon-Khmer groups dating to the Last Glacial Maximum, approximately 15,000 to 18,000 years ago.

A rare haplogroup, O3d, was found at the Daxi culture in the middle reaches of the Yangtze River, indicating that the Daxi people might be the ancestors of modern Hmong–Mien populations, which show only small traces of O3d today. The most representative ancestral lineages of Hmong-Mien speakers come from ancient individuals from Guangxi (GaoHuaHua) and Guizhou (Songshan_o2), dating back to the Ming Dynasty. Other studies also confirm the significant role of Ancient Northern East Asians in shaping the Hmong genome. Overall, Hmong–Mien cluster with Tai-Kadai and Sino-Tibetan speakers compared to other Chinese populations. A 2020 study shows that the core Hmong-Mien population derives more ancestry from Neolithic Mekong (32.3%–35.3%) than Late Neolithic Fujian (23.7%–26.4%), suggesting stronger Austroasiatic affinities although Tai-Kadai ancestry peaks in groups that live in southeastern China.

Genetic stratification exists within the Hmong-Mien population, with northern Hmong-Mien populations exhibiting more genetic similarities with Tibeto-Burman/Sinitic populations and southern Hmong-Mien populations sharing more alleles with Austronesian/Tai-Kadai populations. Hmong-Mien populations within the Miao cluster exhibit stronger genetic influence from neighboring populations like Han Chinese. Other Miao populations are more related to Hmong populations from Vietnam. Yao populations in Guangxi, in contrast, share more genetic drift with Tai-Kadai populations. Bunu-speaking Yao populations exhibit strong genetic affinities with the GaoHuaHua population due to their geographic isolation. She populations from Guizhou cluster with their Hmong-Mien neighbors and received significant input from Tai-Kadai populations whilst She populations from Fujian received more input from Han Chinese populations. In 2021, researchers found that the 'GaoHuaHua' population in Guangxi contributed to the ancestries of modern Hmong-Mien groups in Guangxi. The 'GaoHuaHua' population was modeled as having 66% Dushan-related ancestry and 34% Boshan-related ancestry. They also received Northeast Asian-related Shandong ancestry, which emerged 9,500–7,700 years ago.

=== Homeland ===
One hypothesis of the homeland of the Hmong–Mien languages is southwestern China. Ancient DNA evidence suggests that the ancestors of the speakers of the Hmong–Mien languages were a population genetically distinct from that of the Tai–Kadai and Austronesian language populations at a location on the Yangtze River. Recent Y-DNA phylogeny evidence supports the theory that people who speak the Hmong–Mien languages are descended from a population that is distantly related to those who now speak the Mon-Khmer languages. Another study shows that the core Hmong-Mien population in southern China derived most of their ancestry from Neolithic Mekong (32.3–35.3%) than Late Neolithic Fujian (23.7–26.4%).

In a 2013 study, the time of Proto-Hmong–Mien was estimated to be about 2500 BP (500 BC) by Sagart, Blench, and Sanchez-Mazas using traditional methods employing many lines of evidence, and about 4243 BP by the Automated Similarity Judgment Program (ASJP), an experimental algorithm for automatic generation of phonologically based phylogenies.

== History ==
=== China ===
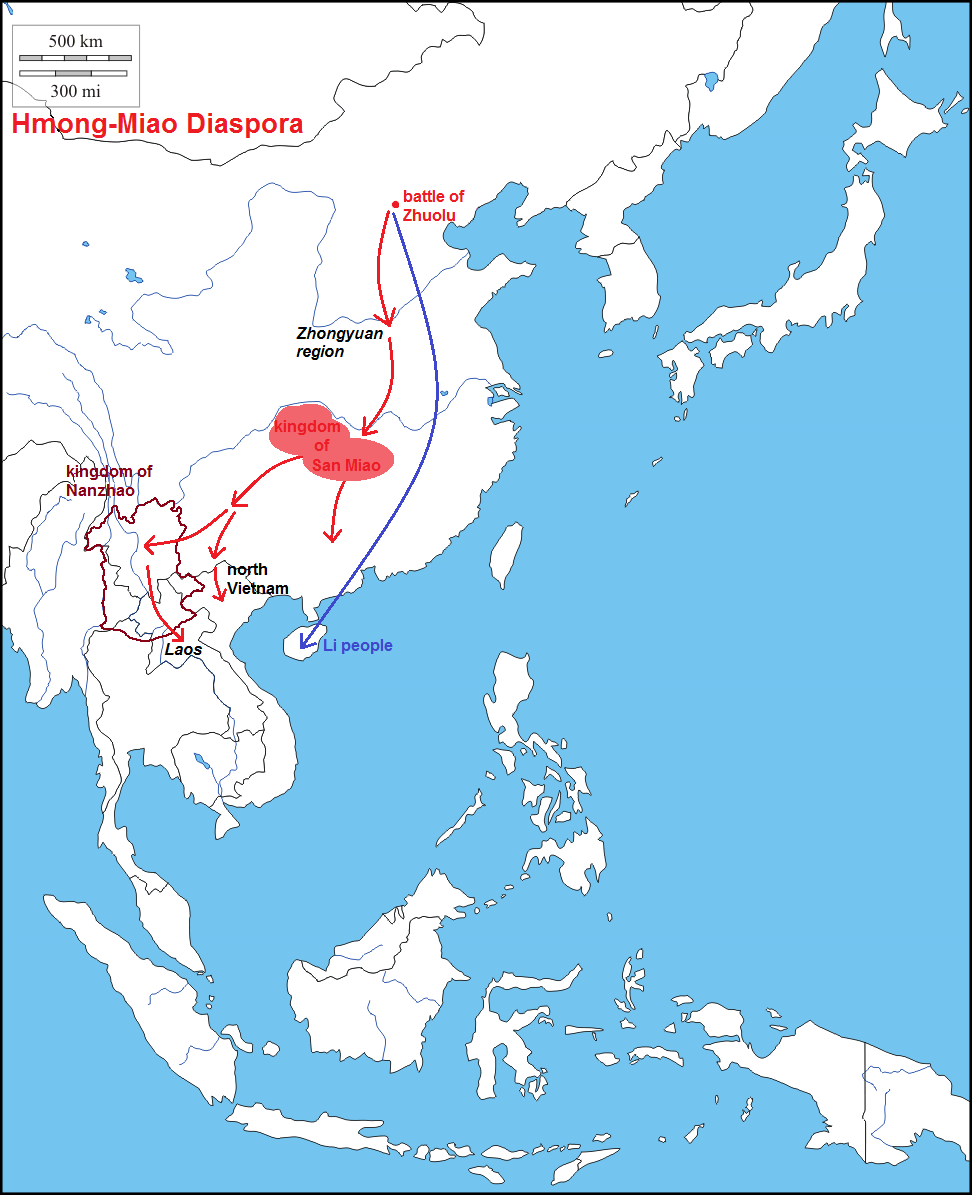
The historical migration of the Hmong according to Hmong tradition

Hmong traditions and legends indicate that they originated near the Yellow River region of northern China, but this is not substantiated by any scientific evidence. According to linguist Martha Ratliff, there is linguistic evidence to suggest that they have occupied some of the same areas of southern China for over 8,000 years.

The author of Guoyu, written in the 4th to 5th century, considered Chi You's Jiuli tribes to be related to the ancient ancestors of the Hmong, the San-Miao people. Chi You is the Hmong ancestral God of War. Today, a statue of Chi You has been erected in the town named Zhuolu.

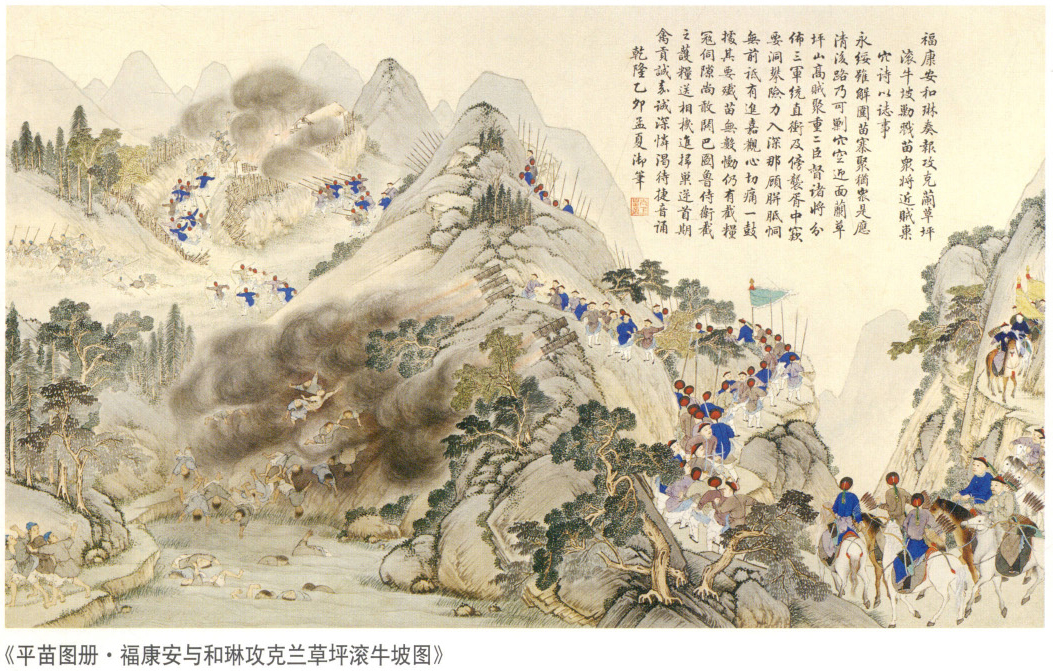
A scene depicting the Qing dynasty's campaign against the Hmong people at Lancaoping in 1795

Conflict between the Hmong of southern China and newly arrived Han settlers increased during the 18th century under repressive economic and cultural reforms imposed by the Qing dynasty. This led to armed conflict and large-scale migrations well into the late 19th century, the period during which many Hmong people emigrated to Southeast Asia. However, the migration process had begun as early as the late 17th century, before the time of major social unrest, when small groups went in search of better agricultural opportunities.

The Hmong people were subjected to persecution and genocide by the Qing dynasty government. Arthur A. Hansen wrote: "In the eighteenth and nineteenth centuries, while the Hmong lived in south-western China, their Manchu overlords had labeled them 'Miao' and targeted them for genocide."

Since 1949, the Miao people (Chinese: 苗族; pinyin: miáo zú) has been an official term for one of the 56 official minority groups recognized by the government of the People's Republic of China. The Miao live mainly in southern China, in the provinces of Guizhou, Hunan, Yunnan, Sichuan, Guangxi, Hainan, Guangdong, and Hubei. According to the 2000 census, the number of 'Miao' in China was estimated to be about 9.6 million. The Miao nationality includes Hmong people as well as other culturally and linguistically related ethnic groups who do not call themselves Hmong. These include the Hmu, Kho (Qho) Xiong, and A-Hmao. The settling region of the Hmong in China is further western than that of the other groups, mainly in Guizhou, Yunnan, Sichuan, Chongqing, and Guangxi.

Xijiang, a Hmong-majority township in Guizhou, China

=== Vietnam ===
The Hmong or Miao began to migrate to Tonkin (Northern Vietnam) in the 19th century, where they struggled to establish their community on the high mountains. They recognized the Tai-speaking overlords of valleys, who were vassals of the Vietnamese court in Hue. The Hue court of Tu Duc at the time was facing multiple crises, unable to retake control of Tonkin and the border regions. The Taiping Rebellion and other Chinese rebels spilled over into Vietnam and had caused anarchy; the Hmong communities thrived on either sides of the Red River, harmonizing with other ethnic groups, and were largely ignored by all factions.

During the colonization of 'Tonkin' (North Vietnam) between 1883 and 1954, a number of Hmong decided to join the Vietnamese Nationalists and Communists, while many Christianized Hmong sided with the French. After the Viet Minh victory, numerous pro-French Hmong had to fall back to Laos and South Vietnam.

=== Laos ===
Hmong political alignments in Laos were divided well before the Laotian Civil War. Rivalries among Hmong leaders and families became intertwined with wider struggles over French colonial rule, Lao nationalism, and competing royalist and revolutionary movements. Touby Lyfoung became associated with the French and later the Royal Lao Government, while Faydang Lobliayao and his younger half-brother Nhiavu Lobliayao became associated with the anti-French and later Pathet Lao revolutionary movement. Other Hmong communities attempted to remain outside the conflict.

==== The U.S. and the Laotian Civil War ====
In late 1960 and early 1961, the United States approved a covert CIA program to develop indigenous paramilitary forces in Laos. A 1964 U.S. government review described the principal effort as the development of Hmong (then generally called "Meo" in U.S. documents) forces and identified Touby Lyfoung and Vang Pao as the two principal Hmong leaders with whom the CIA worked. The same review described the program as providing arms, salaries, subsistence, training, and "plausibly deniable" American air support.

Vang Pao, an officer of the Royal Lao Army, became commander of the principal U.S.-supported Hmong forces in northern Laos. These forces fought the North Vietnamese Army and the Pathet Lao, gathered intelligence, defended territory and installations, and assisted in the recovery of downed American airmen. U.S. records also indicate that American material and air support gave Washington substantial influence over operations conducted by Vang Pao's forces.

Hmong participation in the war was not politically uniform. Hmong also served with the Pathet Lao and revolutionary movement, while others sought to avoid military involvement. Nhiavu Lobliayao became a political cadre within the revolutionary movement and later a senior member of the Lao People's Revolutionary Party.

==== Collapse, flight, and refugee crisis, 1975–1980 ====
As the military and political position of the Royal Lao Government collapsed in May 1975, an emergency air evacuation was organized from Long Tieng, the principal base of Vang Pao's forces. Historian Chia Youyee Vang describes aircraft being used primarily for Hmong military leadership and other selected evacuees, while thousands of people who could not obtain places on the airlift subsequently fled overland toward Thailand. The Minnesota Historical Society estimates that approximately 2,500 Hmong military personnel, officials, and family members were airlifted to Thailand, while many more remained at Long Tieng or made their own way out of Laos.

The evacuation was followed by a much larger and continuing refugee movement. On 5 August 1975, U.S. National Security Adviser Henry Kissinger reported that approximately 23,000 Hmong refugees had entered Thailand and directed U.S. agencies to prepare a plan for their permanent resettlement there, conditional on American financial assistance. In September, President Gerald Ford approved U.S. financial support for a relief and resettlement program administered principally through the Thai government and the United Nations High Commissioner for Refugees (UNHCR).

UNHCR reported during 1975 that more than 33,000 of approximately 40,000 displaced people then arriving from Laos in Thailand were Hmong. By the end of that year, Thai authorities had registered approximately 57,000 displaced people from Laos of different ethnic backgrounds, housed principally in temporary centers near the Lao border. The refugee population continued to change as additional people fled Laos while others obtained resettlement in third countries. By the end of 1976, UNHCR reported that approximately 64,000 displaced persons from Laos remained in Thailand.

Hmong and other Lao refugees began entering the United States before 1980, primarily through special use of the Attorney General's parole authority and other ad hoc refugee programs. The original Indochina Migration and Refugee Assistance Act of 1975 applied to Cambodia and Vietnam; on 21 June 1976, Congress enacted Public Law 94-313, which explicitly amended the law to include refugees from Laos.

Refugee admissions remained an evolving policy issue during the late 1970s. In June 1977, Secretary of State Cyrus Vance told President Jimmy Carter that more than 80,000 refugees remained in camps in Thailand and identified approximately 8,000 as having a "special claim" to U.S. assistance because they had worked directly for the United States, were closely associated with the American war effort, or were immediate relatives of people already in the United States. Vance proposed using parole authority to admit them as part of a larger group of 15,000 Indochinese refugees.

The Refugee Act of 1980 replaced much of this reliance on temporary and ad hoc mechanisms by establishing what Congress described as a "permanent and systematic procedure" for refugee admission and more uniform provisions for domestic resettlement assistance. Hmong families had already been admitted to the United States before the Act; the legislation instead created a regular statutory system under which subsequent Hmong and other refugee admissions could take place.

==== Postwar political division and Hmong resistance ====
The establishment of the Lao People's Democratic Republic (Lao PDR) in December 1975 did not produce a single political experience for Hmong people in Laos. Hmong associated with the victorious revolutionary movement entered the new state. Faydang Lobliayao became a vice-president of the first Supreme People's Assembly of Laos, while Nhiavu Lobliayao remained an influential member of the Lao People's Revolutionary Party.

At the same time, armed resistance developed among some former Royal Lao and U.S.-aligned Hmong communities that remained in Laos. Research based on archival material and oral histories identifies several distinct resistance networks rather than a single postwar organization. Around the Phou Bia area, these included forces associated with former local official and military leader Sai Soua Yang and Chao Fa (Cob Fab) groups associated with Zong Zoua Her and Pa Kao Her.

Some continuity also existed between the wartime military structure and later resistance. CIA historian Thomas L. Ahern records that Colonel Cher Pao Moua continued holding the Hmong position at Bouam Long after the centralized guerrilla army collapsed in May 1975. Later scholarship identifies Cher Pao Moua as a key field commander for Neo Hom inside Laos during the 1980s.

These movements were not organizationally identical. Scholar Ian G. Baird describes Pa Kao Her as crossing the Mekong River into Thailand with a small group of followers in March 1978 and subsequently developing relations with elements of the Thai security establishment while maintaining contacts with Chao Fa followers inside Laos. During the late 1970s and early 1980s, Pa Kao's movement developed into a separate transnational resistance network that later became associated with the Ethnic Liberation Organization of Laos (ELOL).

The United Lao National Liberation Front (ULNLF), commonly known as Neo Hom, developed separately. Historian Nengher N. Vang dates its formation to 1981 and identifies its founders as Vang Pao together with several exiled Lao political and military leaders. Neo Hom included Hmong participants together with exiled Lao political and military figures and presented itself as a broader Lao opposition movement. Its stated goals included opposing Vietnamese military influence, overthrowing the Lao PDR government, and establishing a democratic and neutral Laos. Neo Hom subsequently became one of the most prominent exile organizations supporting opposition to the Lao PDR, but post-1975 Hmong armed resistance had begun before the organization's establishment and continued to include groups with separate leadership and political or religious traditions.

The conflict became entangled in the broader regional rivalries of the Third Indochina War. Following the deterioration of relations between China and Vietnam, Chinese authorities provided military training, weapons, and other assistance to selected anti-Lao PDR organizations, including elements associated with Pa Kao Her's Chao Fa movement. This support should be distinguished from the separate question of outside assistance to Vang Pao's Neo Hom organization.

Thailand also played an important role in the cross-border resistance system. Thai military and security authorities variously facilitated, coordinated, restricted, and monitored Lao insurgent organizations operating from Thai territory. Baird argues that Thai support was closely connected to Thailand's own border-security and intelligence interests rather than representing unconditional sponsorship of the insurgents. Chinese assistance to several resistance networks declined during the mid-1980s, although armed opposition continued through other political, diaspora, and regional networks.

The military strength claimed by resistance organizations was difficult to verify and differed substantially from outside assessments. In its report covering 1987, the United States Department of State stated that several externally financed Lao resistance groups remained active along the Thai-Lao border and in parts of Laos, but assessed that they posed "no serious threat" to the Lao PDR government.

The regional environment changed again after Chatichai Choonhavan became prime minister of Thailand in late 1988. Beginning in early 1989, Thailand's "Battlefields to Marketplaces" policy increasingly emphasized trade and improved relations with neighboring communist governments. Thai authorities consequently reduced support for Lao insurgent groups and increasingly prevented them from maintaining bases on Thai territory.

The loss of Thai sanctuary did not immediately end armed resistance. In December 1989 the ULNLF announced a provisional revolutionary government in exile. Contemporary reporting identified Outhong Souvannavong as its principal political leader and Vang Pao as head of its military arm. The U.S. State Department reported that armed crossings and fighting increased after the announcement and that insurgents temporarily established a base inside Laos before Lao government forces removed it. By 1991, however, the State Department described the insurgency as continuing at a substantially lower level and attributed part of the decline to improved relations between Laos and neighboring countries, particularly Thailand, which had eroded foreign support for the resistance.

==== Repatriation, camp closure, and later refugee resettlement ====
During the 1980s and early 1990s, Thailand, Laos, and the United Nations High Commissioner for Refugees (UNHCR) increasingly sought long-term solutions for the remaining Lao refugee population in Thailand through third-country resettlement and repatriation. UNHCR reported that approximately 67,000 Lao refugees and asylum seekers remained in Thai camps at the beginning of 1991 and that 6,725 people had voluntarily returned to Laos from Thailand under UNHCR auspices between 1980 and January 1991. Most of those early returnees were lowland Lao rather than Hmong.

Hmong attitudes toward the available options were not uniform. Research conducted at Ban Vinai Refugee Camp in 1990 documented substantial interest in eventual third-country resettlement, but also found that many families delayed decisions because of relatives in other camps or countries, language difficulties, debts, elderly family members, complex household structures, or relatives who remained in Laos or Thailand. A separate 1990 interview study by Paul Rabe likewise documented strong Hmong skepticism toward repatriation to Laos. The research therefore showed that remaining in a Thai camp, delaying resettlement, and wishing to return to Laos were not necessarily equivalent choices.

At the same time, Thailand, Laos, and UNHCR were moving away from indefinite refugee-camp maintenance. Tripartite discussions during 1990 and 1991 called for a comprehensive plan, with a defined timeframe, to resolve the remaining Lao refugee population through voluntary repatriation and other durable solutions. UNHCR characterized its repatriation program as voluntary and provided transportation, food, cash assistance, agricultural tools, and reintegration projects for returnees.

The repatriation issue also produced major political divisions among Hmong refugees and exile organizations. In 1991, Vue Mai, a former Royal Lao and resistance figure who had served as a leader at Ban Vinai, publicly endorsed voluntary repatriation. A later account in The Washington Post reported that American officials had sought a prominent Hmong figure who could lend credibility to the return program and regarded Vue Mai as such a leader. His endorsement nevertheless generated intense opposition within parts of the Hmong refugee and diaspora communities.

Vue Mai voluntarily returned to Laos in November 1992, intending in part to help identify a settlement site for relatives and other prospective returnees. He disappeared in Vientiane in September 1993. The U.S. State Department reported that the Lao government denied involvement and that investigators had found no evidence implicating Lao PDR officials; his disappearance remained unresolved in later reporting. Whatever its cause, Vue Mai's disappearance intensified existing Hmong concerns about repatriation and became a major issue in subsequent political debate over the program.

The governments of Thailand and Laos and UNHCR nevertheless continued the organized repatriation program. By the end of 1995, slightly more than 24,000 Lao refugees had returned from Thailand. UNHCR later reported that more than 80 percent of these returnees had previously been recognized as refugees and therefore were not legally required to return, while approximately 4,400 returnees, most of them Hmong, had been rejected during refugee-status screening.

The safety and voluntariness of the repatriation process became politically disputed. Hmong refugee advocates and some members of the U.S. Congress alleged that pressure and coercion were being used against some refugees and questioned whether Hmong returnees would be safe in Laos. U.S. State Department officials disputed broad claims that returnees were being systematically persecuted and stated in 1994 that their monitoring had found no credible evidence at that time of persecution of people who had returned under the organized program. The dispute therefore concerned both the conditions under which refugees made decisions in Thailand and competing assessments of the risks they would face after returning to Laos.

Opposition to repatriation in the United States eventually developed into a broader coalition involving Hmong and Lao refugee organizations, veterans' groups, human-rights advocates, researchers, and members of Congress. In a 1996 statement entered in the Congressional Record, Representative Steve Gunderson credited Vang Pao and several Lao Veterans of America organizers with helping secure new U.S. resettlement opportunities for Hmong refugees at Ban Napho. Gunderson also specifically credited journalist and scholar Jane Hamilton-Merritt and Washington advocate Philip Smith with helping spearhead the campaign in Washington and Congress and with providing information and strategy to his office.

Several thousand Hmong who did not leave Thailand through earlier repatriation or third-country resettlement eventually settled at Wat Tham Krabok, a Buddhist monastery in central Thailand. In December 2003, the United States announced a special refugee-processing program for Lao Hmong who had been registered by Thai authorities as living at the monastery. Approximately 15,000 people were authorized for processing, and large-scale arrivals in the United States began in 2004.

==== Alleged plot to overthrow the government of Laos ====
On 4 June 2007, as part of an investigation labeled Operation Tarnished Eagle, U.S. federal courts ordered warrants issued for the arrest of Vang Pao and nine others for plotting to overthrow the government of Laos in violation of federal Neutrality Acts and for multiple weapons charges. The federal charges alleged that members of the group inspected weapons, including AK-47s, smoke grenades, and Stinger missiles, in order to buy and smuggle into Thailand in June 2007, where they were intended to be used by Hmong resistance forces in Laos. Out of the 9 arrested, one was an American, Harrison Jack, a 1968 West Point graduate and retired Army infantry officer who allegedly attempted to recruit Special Operations veterans to act as mercenaries.

On 15 June, the defendants were indicted by a grand jury; a warrant was also issued for the arrest of an 11th man allegedly involved in the plot. Simultaneous raids of the defendants' homes and work locations, involving over 200 federal, state and local law enforcement officials, were conducted in approximately 15 U.S. cities in Central and Southern California.

Multiple protest rallies in support of the suspects, designed to raise awareness of the treatment of Hmong peoples in the jungles of Laos, took place in California, Minnesota, Wisconsin, and Alaska. Several of Vang Pao's high-level supporters in the U.S. criticized the California court that issued the arrest warrants, arguing that Vang was a historically important American ally and a valued leader of U.S. and foreign-based Hmong. Calls to Californian Republican governor Arnold Schwarzenegger and President George W. Bush to pardon the defendants went unanswered pending a conclusion to the large, ongoing federal investigation.

On 18 September 2009, the U.S. federal government dropped all charges against Vang Pao, announcing that the federal government was permitted to consider "the probable sentence or other consequences if the person is convicted". On 10 January 2011, after Vang Pao's death, the federal government dropped all charges against the remaining defendants saying, "Based on the totality of the circumstances in the case, the government believes, as a discretionary matter, that continued prosecution of defendants is no longer warranted."

=== Thailand ===
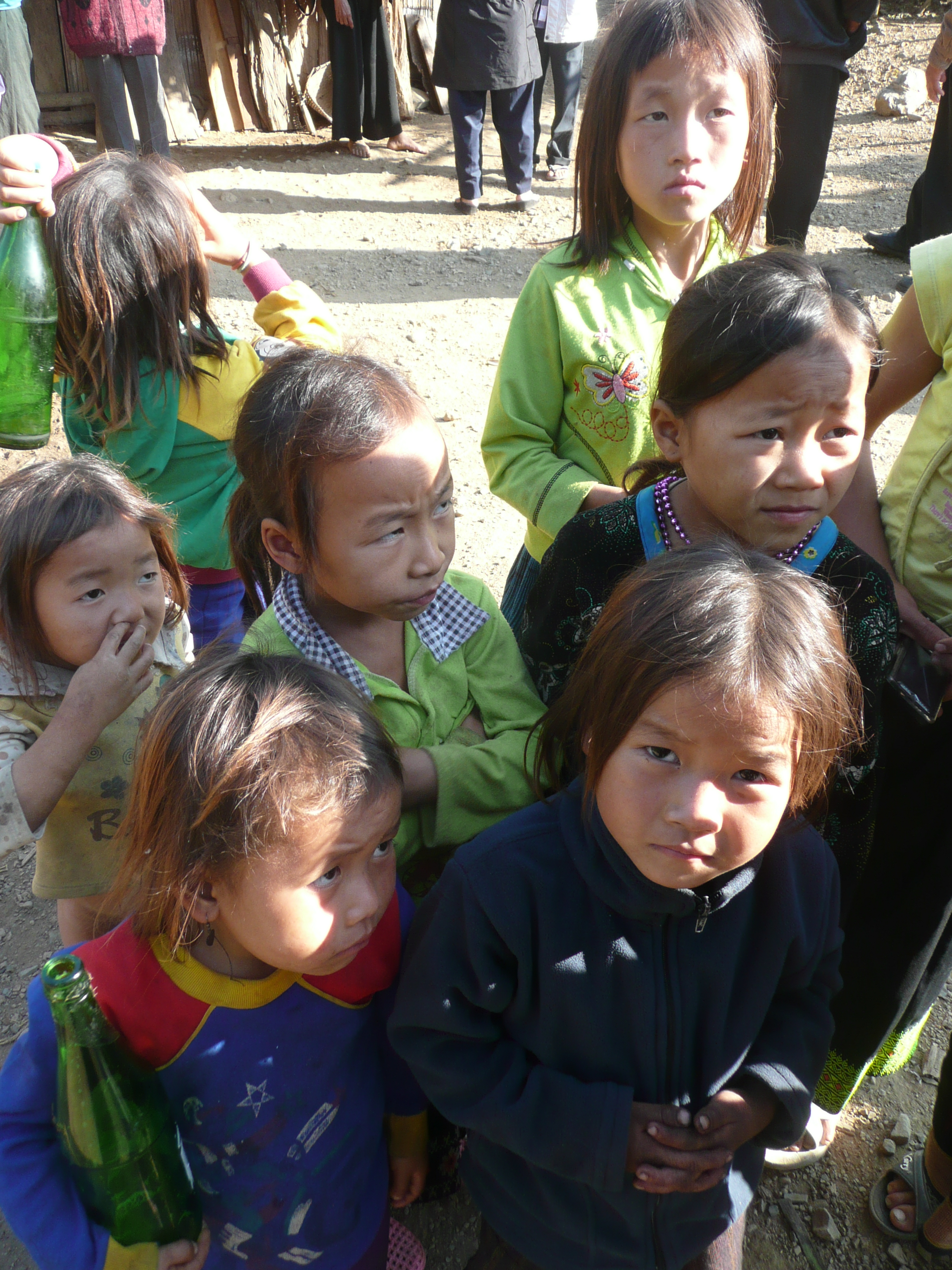
Hmong chlidren in Thailand

The presence of Hmong settlements in Thailand is documented from the end of the 19th century on. Initially, the Siamese paid little attention to them. But in the early 1950s, the state suddenly took a number of initiatives aimed at establishing links. Decolonization and nationalism were gaining momentum in the peninsula and wars of independence were raging. Armed opposition to the state in northern Thailand, triggered by outside influence, started in 1967 while again many Hmong refused to take sides in the conflict. Communist guerrilla warfare stopped by 1982 as a result of an international concurrence of events that rendered it pointless. Priority has since been given by the Thai state to sedentarizing the mountain population, introducing commercially viable agricultural techniques and national education, with the aim of integrating these non-Tai animists within the national identity.

=== In the United States ===
Hmong refugees began resettling in the United States in 1975 following the collapse of the Royal Lao Government. Early arrivals included former employees and military personnel associated with the United States as well as spouses, children, and other family members. Hmong families therefore began arriving in the United States several years before passage of the Refugee Act of 1980.

Because refugees from Laos were not included in the original Indochina Migration and Refugee Assistance Act of 1975, early Lao and Hmong admissions relied heavily on special use of the Attorney General's immigration parole authority. Congress amended the Act on 21 June 1976 to explicitly include refugees from Laos. Additional refugee admissions were subsequently authorized through a series of parole programs. In June 1977, Secretary of State Cyrus Vance identified approximately 8,000 refugees in Thai camps as having a particular claim to U.S. protection because of direct employment by the United States, close association with the American war effort, or immediate family relationships with people already in the United States.

The Refugee Act of 1980 did not begin Hmong family migration to the United States. Rather, it established a permanent and systematic refugee-admissions procedure and more uniform federal provisions for refugee resettlement, replacing much of the ad hoc system used during the second half of the 1970s. Hmong migration expanded substantially during and after this period as refugees left camps in Thailand and were resettled through American voluntary agencies, religious organizations, sponsors, and family networks.

Hmong refugees were initially dispersed to communities throughout the United States through the refugee sponsorship system. Subsequent secondary migration and family reunification produced particularly large Hmong-American communities in California, Minnesota, and Wisconsin. An additional major resettlement occurred beginning in 2004 after the United States opened a special program for approximately 15,000 Lao Hmong living at Wat Tham Krabok in Thailand.

As of the 2010 census, 260,073 Hmong people resided in the United States. An analysis of 2021–2023 data by the Pew Research Center estimated that approximately 330,000 people in the United States identified as Hmong alone.

== Culture ==
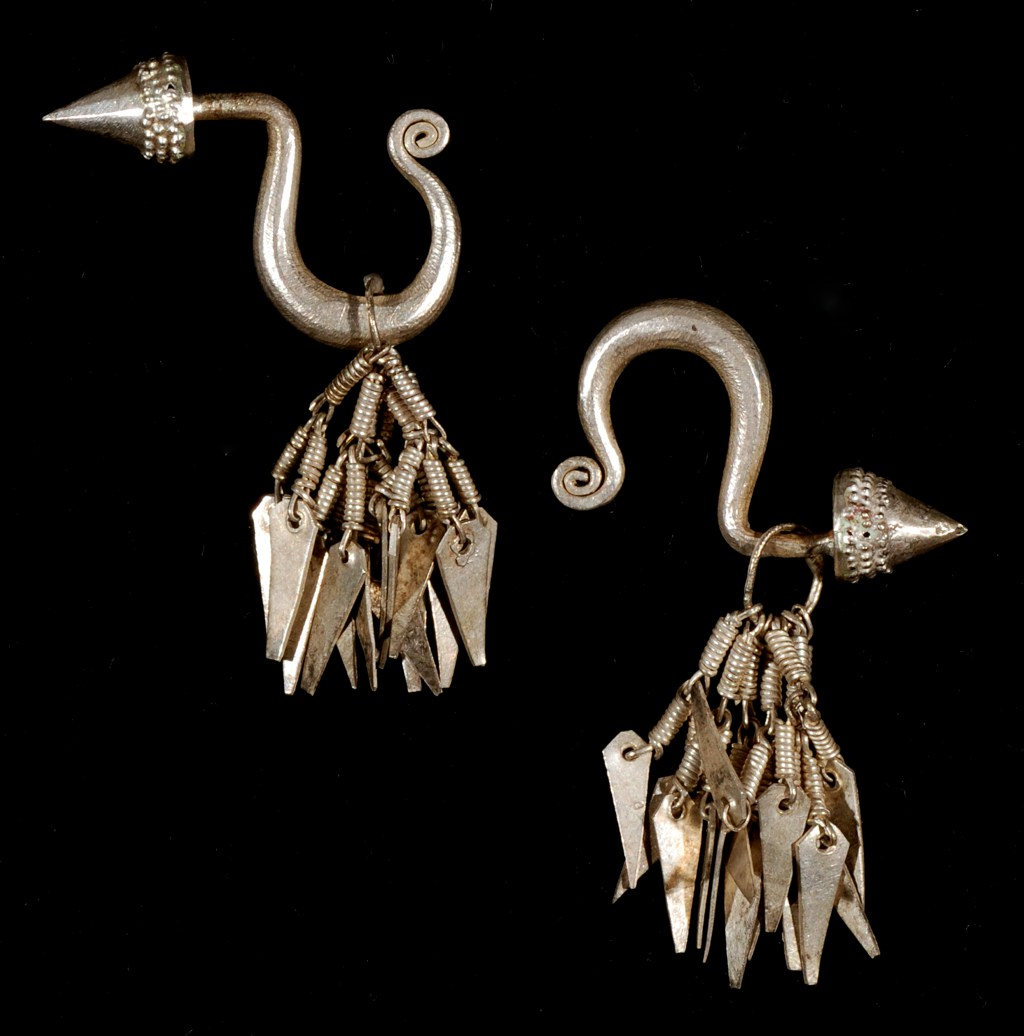
A pair of traditional Hmong fine silver earrings

Hmong people have their own terms for their cultural divisions. Hmong Der (Hmoob Dawb), and Hmong Leng (Hmoob Leeg) are the terms for two of the largest groups in the United States and Southeast Asia. These subgroups are also known as the White Hmong and Blue or Green Hmong, respectively. These names originate from the color and designs of women's dresses in each respective group, with the White Hmong distinguished by the white dresses women wear on special occasions, and the Blue/Green Hmong by the blue batiked dresses. The name and pronunciation "Hmong" is exclusively used by the White Hmong to refer to themselves, and many dictionaries use only the White Hmong dialect.

In the Romanized Popular Alphabet, developed in the 1950s in Laos, these terms are written Hmoob Dawb (White Hmong) and Hmoob Leeg (Green Hmong). The final consonants indicate with which of the eight lexical tones the word is pronounced.

White Hmong and Green Hmong speak mutually intelligible dialects of the Hmong language, with some differences in pronunciation and vocabulary. One of the most characteristic differences is the use of the voiceless /m̥/ in White Hmong, indicated by a preceding "H" in the Romanized Popular Alphabet. Voiceless nasals are not found in the Green Hmong dialect. Hmong groups are often named after the dominant colors or patterns of their traditional clothing, style of head-dress, or the provinces from which they come.

=== Vietnam and Laos ===
The Hmong groups in Vietnam and Laos, from the 18th century to the present day, are known as Black Hmong (Hmoob Dub), Striped Hmong (Hmoob Txaij), White Hmong (Hmoob Dawb), Hmong Leng (Hmoob Leeg) and Green Hmong (Hmoob Ntsuab). In other places in Asia, groups are also known as Black Hmong (Hmoob Dub or Hmong Dou), Striped Hmong (Hmoob Txaij or Hmoob Quas Npab), Hmong Shi, Hmong Pe, Hmong Pua, and Hmong Xau, Hmong Xanh (Green Hmong), Hmong Do (Red Hmong), Na Mieo and various other subgroups. These include the Flower Hmong or the Variegated Hmong (Hmong Lenh or Hmong Hoa), so named because of their bright, colorful embroidery work (called pa ndau or paj ntaub, literally 'flower cloth').

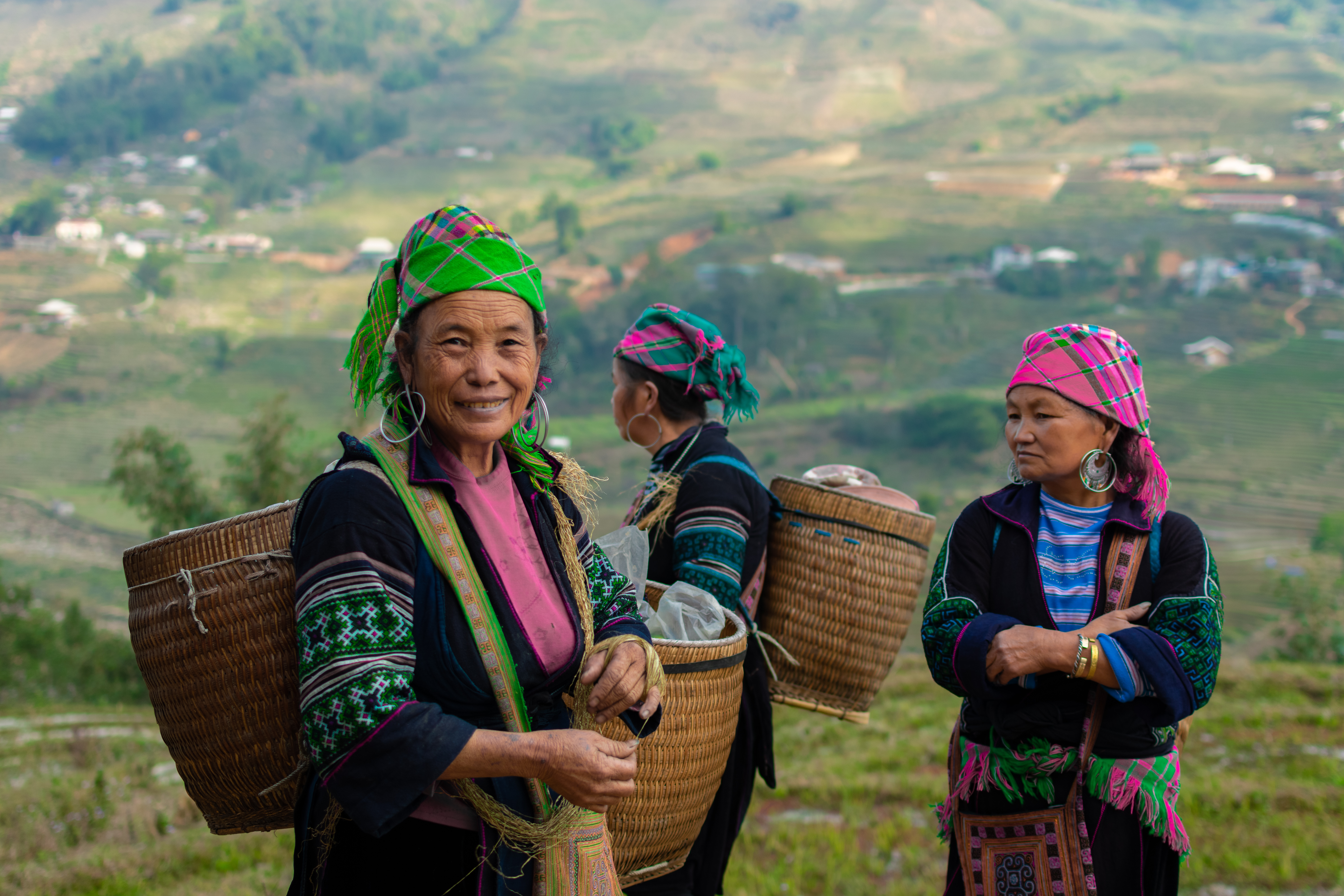
Hmong folk costume in Sa Pa, Vietnam

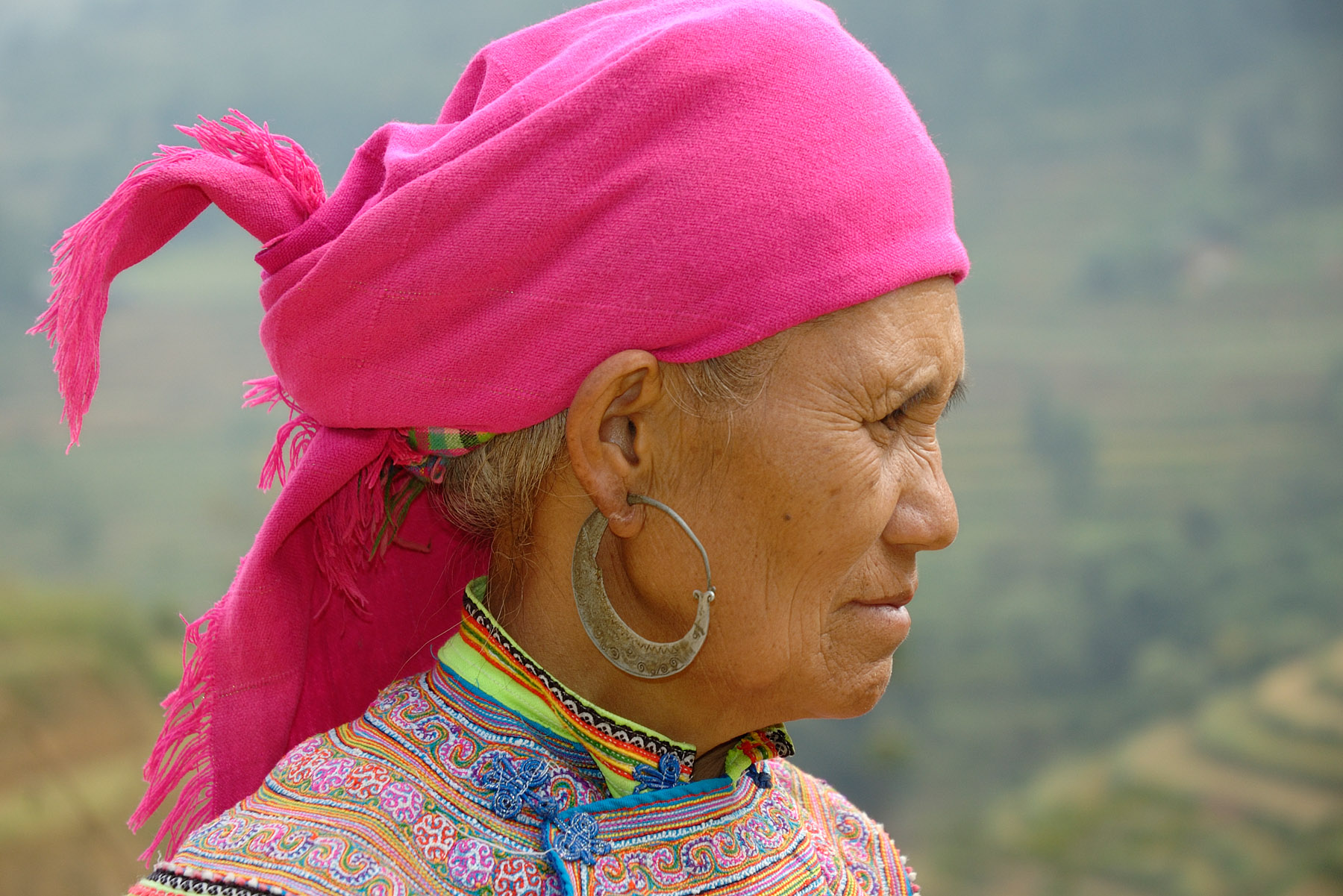
A Flower Hmong woman in Vietnam

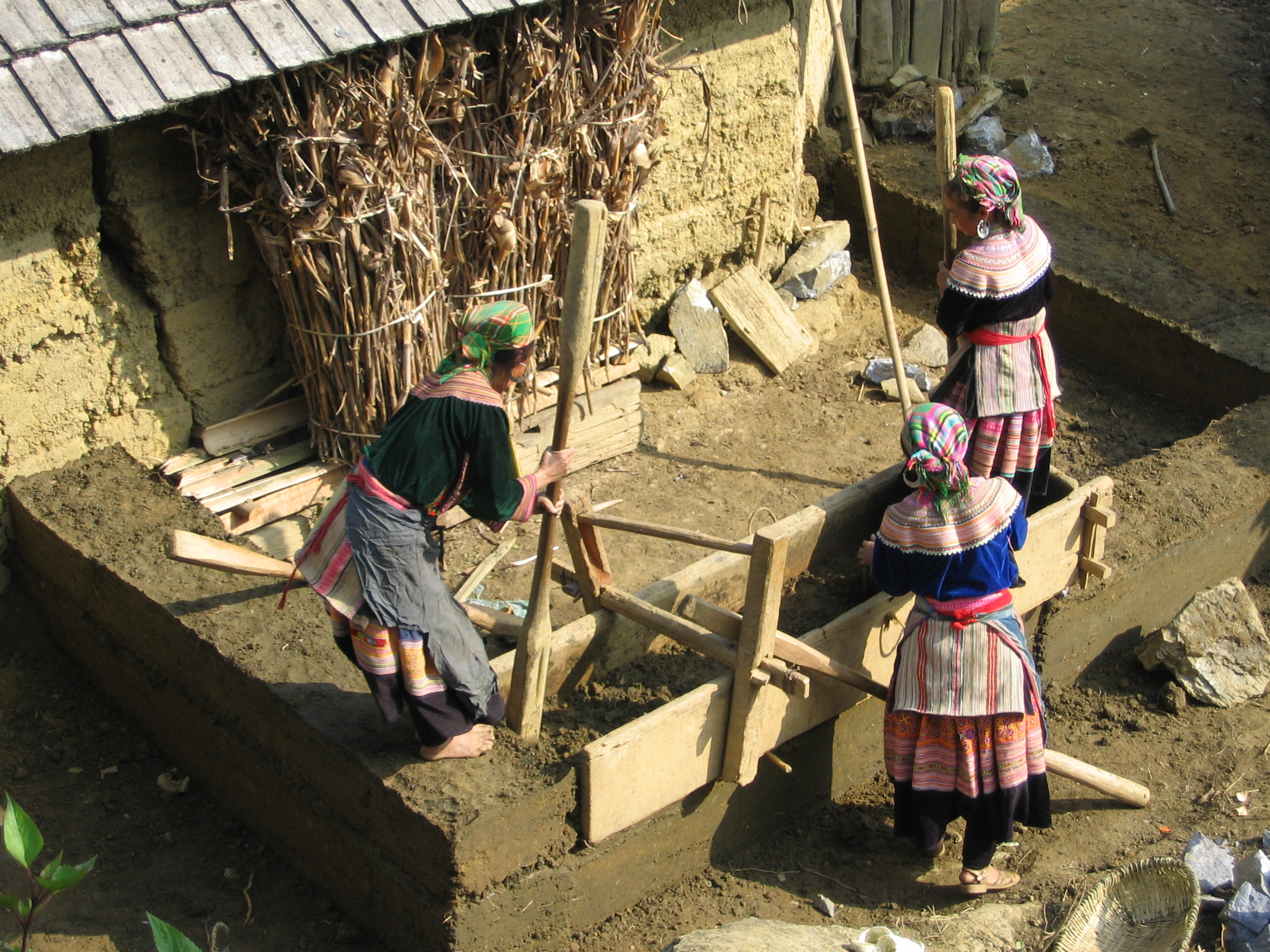
A typical rammed earth house–building technique of Flower Hmong in Vietnam

=== Hmong/Mong controversy ===
When Western authors first came in contact with Hmong people in the 18th century, they referred to them by writing ethnonyms which were previously assigned to them by the Chinese (i.e., Miao, or variants). This practice continued into the 20th century. Even ethnographers studying the Hmong people in Southeast Asia often referred to them as Meo, an alteration of Miao applied by Thai and Lao people to the Hmong. Although Meo was an official term, it was often used as an insult against the Hmong people, and it is considered to be derogatory.

The issue came to a head during the passage of California State Assembly Bill (AB) 78, in the 2003–2004 season. Introduced by Doua Vu and Assembly Member Sarah Reyes, District 31 (Fresno), the bill encouraged changes in secondary education curriculum to include information about the Secret War and the role of Hmong people in the war. Furthermore, the bill called for the use of oral histories and first-hand accounts by Hmong people who had participated in the war and were caught up in its aftermath. Originally, the language of the bill mentioned only "Hmong" people, intending to include the entire community. Several Mong Leng activists, led by Paoze Thao, professor of linguistics and education at California State University, Monterey Bay, drew attention to the problems associated with omitting Mong from the language of the bill. They noted that despite nearly equal numbers of Hmong Der and Mong Leng in the United States, resources are disproportionately allocated to the Hmong Der community. This not only includes scholarly research, but also the translation of materials, including the curriculum proposed by the bill. Despite these arguments, Mong was not added to the bill. In the version of the bill that was passed by the assembly, Hmong was replaced by Southeast Asians, a broader and more inclusive term.

Paoze Thao and some others strongly feel that Hmong can only be used in reference to Hmong Der people because it does not include "Mong" Leng people. He feels that the use of Hmong in reference to both groups perpetuates the marginalization of the Mong Leng language and culture. Thus, he advocates the use of Hmong and Mong in reference to the entire ethnic group. Other scholars, including anthropologist Gary Yia Lee (a Hmong Der person), suggest that for the past 30 years, Hmong has been used to refer to the entire community, and, as a result, the inclusion of the Mong Leng people is understandable. Some argue that such distinctions create unnecessary divisions within the global community, arguing that the use of these distinctions will only confuse non-Hmong and Mong people who are both trying to learn more about Hmong and Mong history and culture.

As a compromise alternative, multiple iterations of Hmong have been proposed. A Hmong Christian theologian, Paul Joseph T. Khamdy Yang, has proposed the use of the term HMong in reference to the Hmong and the Mong communities by capitalizing the H and the M. The ethnologist Jacques Lemoine has also begun to use the term (H)mong in reference to the entirety of the Hmong and Mong communities.

== Diaspora ==
Linguistic data shows that the Hmong of the peninsula stem from the Miao of southern China as one among a set of ethnic groups belonging to the Hmong–Mien language family. Linguistically and culturally speaking, the Hmong and the other sub-groups of the Miao have little in common.

Vietnam, where their presence is attested from the late 18th century onwards and characterized with both assimilation, cooperation and hostility, is likely to be the first Southeastern Eurasian country into which the Hmong migrated. At the 2019 national census, there were 1,393,547 Hmong living in Vietnam, the vast majority of them in the north of the country. The traditional trade in coffin wood with China and cultivation of the opium poppy—not prohibited in Vietnam until 1993—long guaranteed a regular cash income. Today, cash cropping is the main economic activity. As in China and Laos, Hmong participate to a certain degree in local and regional administration. In the late 1990s, several thousands of Hmong started moving to the Central Highlands and some crossed the border into Cambodia, constituting the first attested presence of Hmong settlers in that country.

After the 1975 Communist victory, thousands of Hmong from Laos had to seek refuge abroad. Approximately 30 percent of the Hmong left, although the only concrete figure is 116,000 Hmong from Laos and Vietnam together seeking refuge in Thailand up to 1990. In 2015, the Hmong in Laos numbered 595,028.

In 2002 the Hmong in Thailand numbered 151,080.

Myanmar most likely includes a modest number of Hmong (perhaps around 2,500) but no reliable census has been conducted there recently.

As result of refugee movements in the wake of the Indochina Wars (1946–1975), in particular, in Laos, the largest Hmong community to settle outside Asia went to the United States where approximately 100,000 individuals had already arrived by 1990. By the same date, 10,000 Hmong had migrated to France, including 1,400 in French Guiana; Canada admitted 900 individuals, while another 360 went to Australia, 260 to China, and 250 to Argentina. Over the following years and until the definitive closure of the last refugee camps in Thailand in 1998, additional numbers of Hmong have left Asia, but the definitive figures are still to be produced.

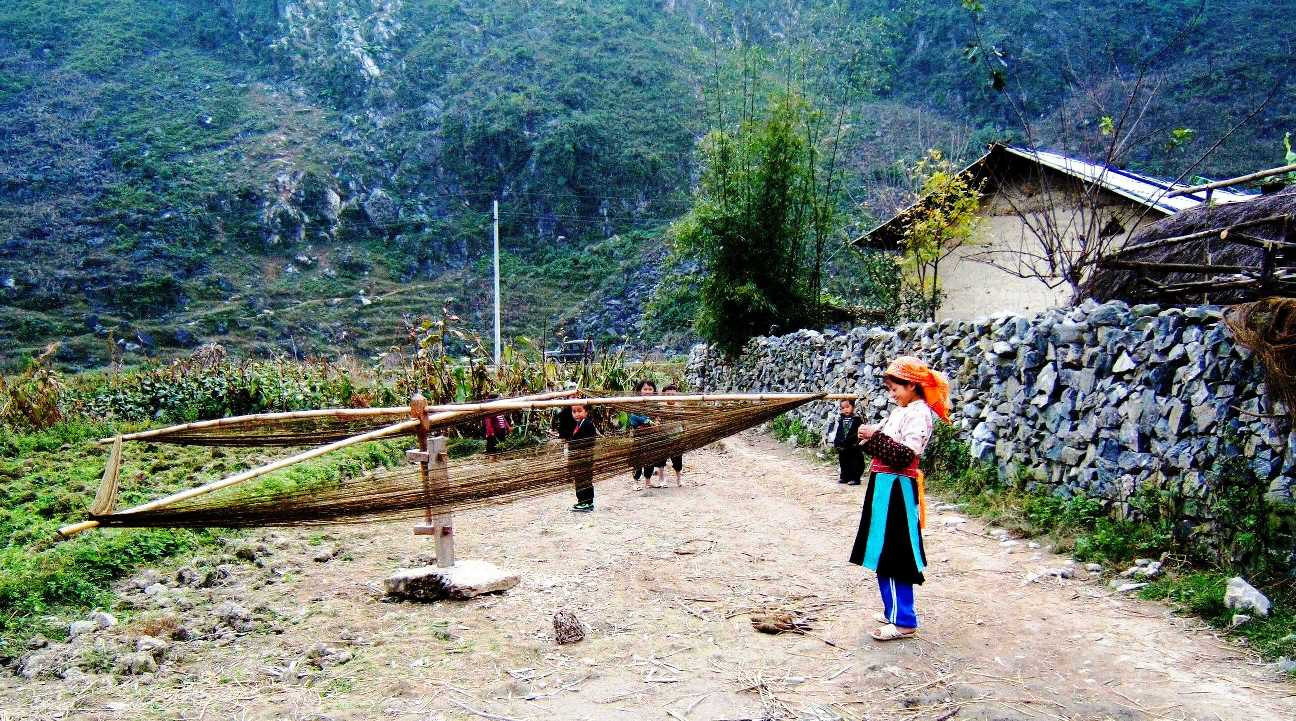
Hmong girl (aged 15) preparing wedding dress, Phố Cáo commune, Hà Giang province, Vietnam

Approximately 5% of the Hmong population currently lives outside of Asia, with the United States home to the largest Hmong diaspora community. The 2008 census counted 171,316 people solely of Hmong ancestry, and 221,948 persons of at least partial Hmong ancestry. Other countries with significant populations include:

- France: 15,000
- Australia: 2,000
- French Guiana: 1,500
- Canada: 835
- Argentina: 600

The Hmong population within the United States is centered in the Upper Midwest (Wisconsin, Minnesota) and California.

=== Vietnam ===
Hmong people in Vietnam have been perceived differently by various modern political organizations and in different historical periods. Since the Hmong are an ethnic minority in Vietnam, their loyalty toward the Vietnamese state has been frequently questioned by the state. However, many Hmong in Vietnam are fiercely loyal, regardless of the current ideologies of the government; the Hmong in Laos and Cambodia are the most supportive of active resistance. These tend to be Hmong Christians that have been targeted by all three Vietnamese governments. The Hmong in Vietnam also receive cultural and political incentives from the government. which led to the Vietnamese Hmong further diverging from the Laotian Hmong, since the latter are strongly anti-Vietnamese due to the Laotian Civil War and Communism.

=== Laos ===
There are 595,028 Hmong people in Laos as of 2015. They mainly live in northern regions.

=== Myanmar ===
In Myanmar, Hmong are known as Myaung Zee or Hmont people. They are living mainly in northern, southern and eastern Shan State, as well as in Wa State.

=== Thailand ===
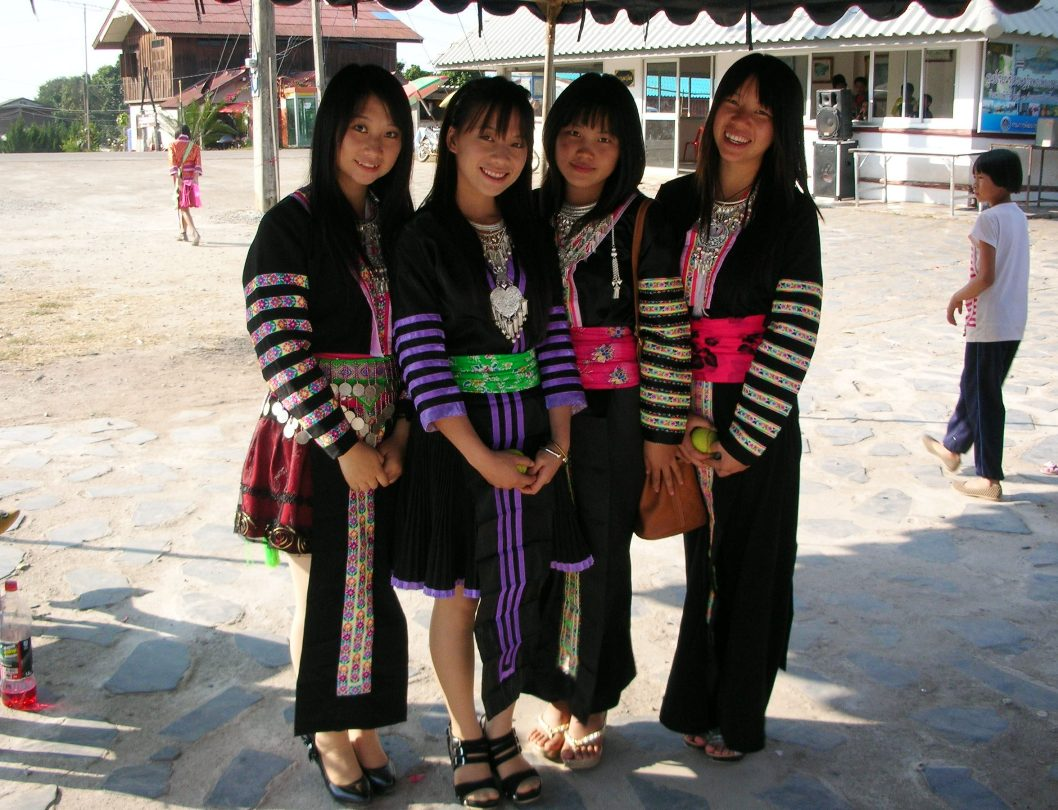
Hmong girls in Thoeng District, Thailand

The Hmong presence in Thailand dates back to the turn of the 20th century when families migrated from China through Laos and Burma, according to most authors. A relatively small population, they still formed dozens of villages and hamlets throughout the northern provinces. The Hmong were registered by the state as the Meo hill tribe. Then, more Hmong migrated from Laos to Thailand following the victory of the Pathet Lao in 1975. While some ended up in refugee camps, others settled in mountainous areas among more ancient Hill Tribes.

=== Americas ===
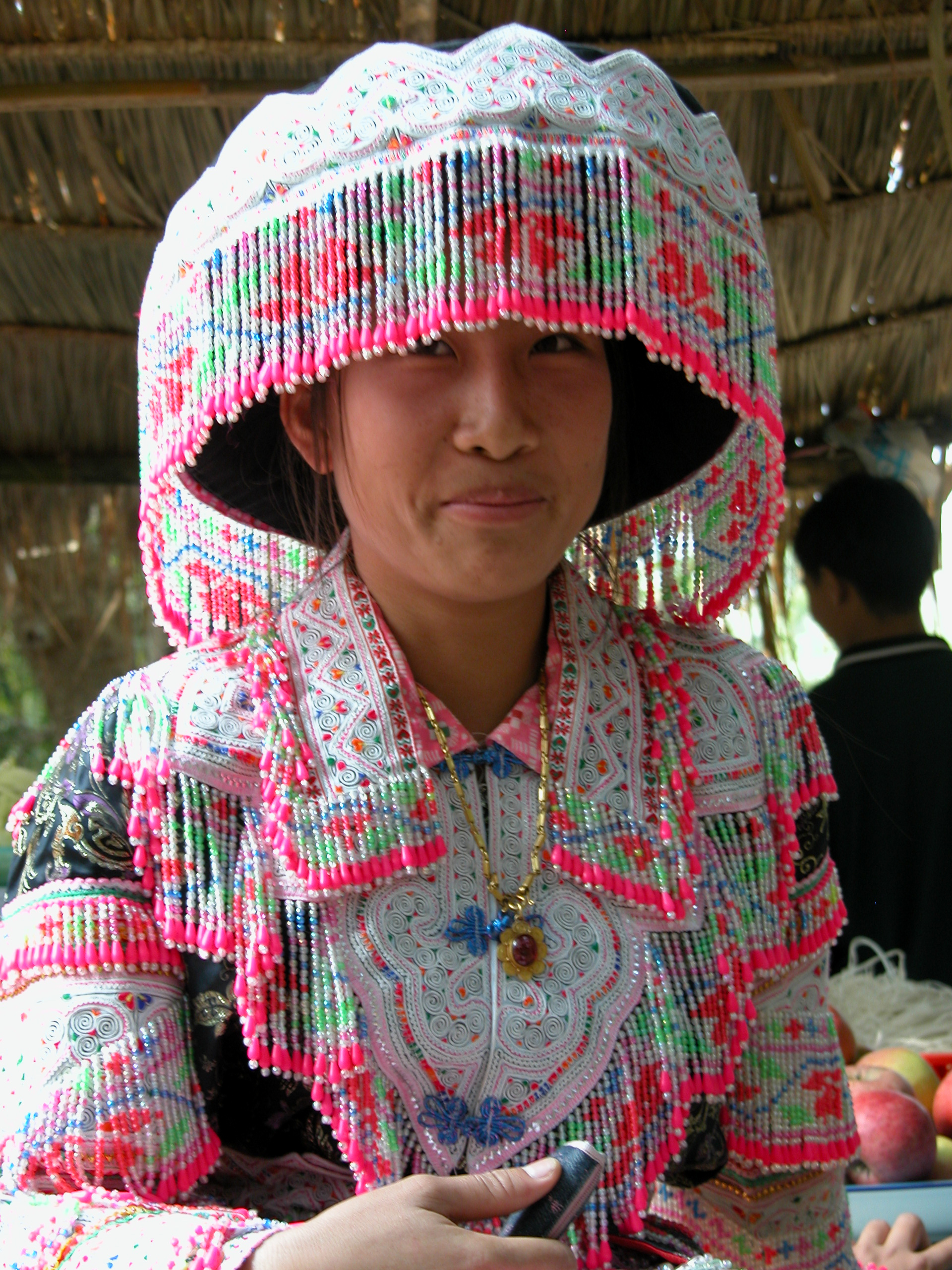
Hmong woman in Luang Prabang

The United States is home to the largest Hmong population outside Asia. Hmong refugee resettlement in the United States began in 1975 and continued through a series of parole and refugee-admission programs during the late 1970s before the Refugee Act of 1980 established a permanent statutory refugee-admissions system. Subsequent migration, family reunification, and secondary migration produced particularly large Hmong-American communities in California, Minnesota, and Wisconsin.

As of the 2010 census, 260,073 Hmong people resided in the United States. An analysis of 2021–2023 data by the Pew Research Center estimated that approximately 330,000 people in the United States identified as Hmong alone.

In terms of cities and towns, the largest Hmong-American community is in Saint Paul (29,662), followed by Fresno (24,328), Sacramento (16,676), Milwaukee (10,245), and Minneapolis (7,512).

There are smaller Hmong communities scattered across the United States, including those in Minnesota (Rochester, Mankato, Duluth); Michigan (Detroit and Warren); Anchorage, Alaska; Denver, Colorado; Portland, Oregon; Washington; North Carolina (Charlotte, Morganton); South Carolina (Spartanburg); Georgia (Auburn, Duluth, Monroe, Atlanta, and Winder); Florida (Tampa Bay); California (Merced); Wisconsin (Madison, Eau Claire, Appleton, Green Bay, Milwaukee, Oshkosh, La Crosse, Sheboygan, Manitowoc, and Wausau); Aurora, Illinois; Kansas City, Kansas; Tulsa, Oklahoma; Missoula, Montana; Des Moines, Iowa; Springfield, Missouri; Arkansas, Fitchburg, Massachusetts, and Providence, Rhode Island.

Sunisa "Suni" Lee of Saint Paul, Minnesota, is a notable Hmong-American; she is a three time Olympic medalist in artistic gymnastics. In the 2020 Summer Olympics, Lee won silver in the women's artistic team all-around, followed by gold in the women's artistic individual all-around and bronze in the women's uneven bars. With these results, Sunisa made history as both the first Hmong-American to compete in the Olympics in any sport and the first Hmong-American to win an Olympic medal.

Canada's small Hmong population is mostly concentrated within the province of Ontario. Kitchener, Ontario, has 515 residents of Hmong descent, and has a Hmong church.

There is also a small community of several thousand Hmong who migrated to French Guiana in the late 1970s and early 1980s, that can be mainly found in the Hmong villages of Javouhey (1200 individuals) and Cacao (950 individuals).

The Hmong immigrant population of Detroit is a central focus of the 2008 film Gran Torino, though that city does not have a significant Hmong population.

== Religious persecution ==
Hmong Catholics, Protestants, and animists have been subjected to military attacks, police arrest, imprisonment, forced disappearances, extrajudicial killings, and torture in Laos and Vietnam on anti-religious grounds.

A significant example was the deportation of Zoua Yang and her 27 children from Thailand on 19 December 2005, after the group was arrested attending a church in Ban Kho Noi, Phetchabun Province, Thailand. Yang and her children were detained upon their return to Laos, after which the whereabouts of much of the family are unknown.

In 2011, Vietnam People's Army troops were used to crush a peaceful demonstration by Hmong Catholic, Protestant and Evangelical Christians who gathered in Dien Bien Province and the Dien Bien Phu area of northwestern Vietnam, according to Philip Smith of the Center for Public Policy Analysis, independent journalists and others. In 2013, Vam Ngaij Vaj, a Christian pastor of Hmong ancestry, was beaten to death by Vietnamese police and security forces. In Hanoi, Vietnamese government officials refused to allow medical treatment for a Hmong Christian leader, Duong Van Minh, who was suffering from a serious kidney illness, in February 2014.

The U.S. Commission on International Religious Freedom has documented official and ongoing religious persecution and religious-freedom violations against the Laotian and Hmong people in both Laos and Vietnam by the governments. In April 2011, the Center for Public Policy Analysis also researched and documented cases of Hmong Christians being attacked and summarily executed, including four Lao Hmong Christians.

== See also ==
- Chi You, (Huab Tais Txiv Yawg) a noted ancestor of the Hmong People
- Hmong churches
- Hmong cuisine
- Hmong customs and culture
- Hmong funeral
- Hmong music
- Hmong textile art
- Indochina refugee crisis
- Ban Phou Pheung Noi
- Wangyee Vang
- Vang Pobzeb
- Vang Pao
- List of Hmong people
- Long Tieng
- Sheboygan Hmong Memorial
- The Art of Not Being Governed
- Bhutanese people
- Khmu people
- Nepalis
- Nyaw people
- Tai Dam people
- Tibetans
- Burmese people
