= Samtay district =

Samtay district ເມືອງຊຳໃຕ້
- District
- Interactive map of Samtay district
- Country: Laos
- Province: Houaphanh
- Time zone: UTC+7 (ICT)

Samtay District (or Xamtay) is a district (muang) of Houaphanh province in northeastern Laos.
