= Bounsuan Kitiyano =

Bounsuan Kitiyano (Lao: ບຸນສວນ ກິຕິຍາໂນ) was a Lao political activist and refugee based in Thailand. He was killed in May 2023 in Ubon Ratchathani province.

== Activism ==
Bounsuan was a member of the Free Laos group and was a refugee recognized by the United Nations High Commissioner for Refugees (UNHCR).

== Death ==
On 16 May 2023, Bounsuan was shot three times while riding his motorcycle through a forest in Song Khon Subdistrict, Si Mueang Mai District, Ubon Ratchathani Province. Prior to his death, he had lived in Thailand for four years awaiting his request for asylum in Australia.

Bounsuan's death was under investigation by Thai police.
