= Wat Tham Krabok =

Buddhist temple in Thailand

Coordinates: 14°42′51″N 100°47′30″E

Wat Tham Krabok (Thai: วัดถ้ำกระบอก, literally 'Temple of the Bamboo Cave') is a Buddhist temple (wat) in the Phra Phutthabat District of Saraburi Province, Thailand.

The temple was first established as a monastery in 1957 by a Buddhist nun, Mian Parnchand (generally known as Luang Por Yai) and her two nephews, Chamroon and Charoen Parnchand, who had both ordained as monks at Wat Khlong Mao in Lopburi Province. Luang Por Chamroon, a former Thai policeman, was the first abbot; although Wat Tham Krabok was not officially a Buddhist temple, it was granted official 'Wat' status in 2012. Uniquely, it continues to follow the teachings of Luang Por Yai, a woman. The entrance now correctly claims it is a temple or wat. The temple is majestic in its appearance, with two elephants supporting a globe marking its entrance. There are many large Buddha images on the temple grounds.

== Drug rehabilitation ==
Wat Tham Krabok has received global attention for its heroin and opium drug rehabilitation program, which was started in 1959. Over 100,000 heroin and opium addicts have since gone through the Wat Tham Krabok detox program, a program consisting of Buddhist meditation, induced vomiting, and the consumption of a secret detoxification potion composed of many different herbs. In 1975, Luang Por Chamrun Parnchand was awarded the Ramon Magsaysay Award for the temple's drug rehabilitation work.

Many Western drug users have sought treatment for their addictions at Wat Tham Krabok, In 2002 Stuart Brindley became the first methadone addict from the UK to be treated at the monastery while other Westerners including British punk rock musician Pete Doherty, Irish rock music singer Christy Dignam of Aslan, American computer underground personality Patrick K. Kroupa, and British singer songwriter Tim Arnold.

In 2004, Tim Arnold's success story was the subject of many news articles in the UK. After completing the program Arnold then became a permanent Tham Krabok resident and a favorite of the monastery's abbot, Luang Por Charoen. Because opium used to be commonly grown and, at times, consumed by the Hmong (largely for medicinal purposes) in the highlands of Thailand and Laos, some Hmong refugees have undergone addiction treatment at Wat Tham Krabok. Wat Tham Krabok also supports the detoxification of those addicted to alcohol and methamphetamines.

== Hmong refugees ==
After the end of the Vietnam War in the late 1970s, Wat Tham Krabok hosted Hmong refugees in a camp on its grounds as the result of their participation in the Secret War. Most had fled Laos alleging that they were persecuted by the communist government that ruled Laos since 1975. Many thousands of the Laotian and Hmong refugees and asylum seekers at Wat Tham Krabok had also sought refuge at the temple after fleeing forced repatriation efforts at other refugee camps in Thailand, because they did not want to return to the Marxist government in Laos. More Lao and Hmong refugees continued to arrive and seek sanctuary at Wat Tham Krabok until over 15,000 Hmong were eventually allowed, after a long policy battle in both the United States and Thailand, to emigrate to the US in 2004 and 2005 as political refugees, instead of being forced back to Laos. Some moved to the United States as early as in 2001.

In the late 1970s, Wat Tham Krabok, and particularly its abbot, Luang Por Chamroon, supported Hmong armed resistance against the Lao PDR government, particularly the Neo Hom led by General Vang Pao and other Laotian leaders, independent Chao Fa groups, and one sub-faction of the Chao Fa led by Pa Kao Her. The Hmong were US allies in the secret war against the communist Pathet Lao, the Viet Cong, and North Vietnam. When several Thailand-based Hmong refugee camps closed due to a lack of financial support in the early 1990s, Lao and Hmong refugees in Thailand fled to the temple to avoid repatriation to Laos. The population at the temple quickly grew to about 35,000, although it later declined significantly.

Beginning in 1993, the US The Centre for Public Policy Analysis (CPPA), and its executive director, Philip Smith, made over seven research missions to Wat Tham Krabok and Laotian and Hmong refugee camps in Thailand. Philip Smith, the CPPA, and the Lao Veterans of America, repeatedly conducted US congressional-backed research missions on the plight of Laotian and Hmong refugees fleeing forced repatriation and human rights violations in communist Laos and Thailand. These joint US congressional and CPPA research missions sought to review policy developments in Thailand and Laos, and to convey humanitarian offers of support and assistance to the abbot, temple monks, and Hmong and Laotian refugee leaders, from members of congress and international human rights organizations. For over a decade, prominent members of congress, in bipartisan fashion, also supported US-backed research missions by Philip Smith and the CPPA to Wat Tham Krabok, and the Laotian and Hmong refugee camps along the Mekong River and the Thai-Lao border. Support for these missions came from a bipartisan coalition in the US Congress, including Congressman Steve Gunderson (Republican-Wisconsin), Congressman Bruce Vento (D-Minnesota), Senator Paul Wellstone (D-Minnesota) and others. The findings of these missions were frequently discussed in news stories, and at sessions of the US Congressional Forum on Laos held in the US Congress and Library of Congress.

Wat Tham Krabok and its Hmong refugees drew global attention in the late 1980s and mid-1990s, as they became the subject of a major global political debate over their future, and the future of Lao and Hmong refugees and asylum seekers in Thailand. The government of Thailand, with support from the United Nations and the US government, sought to repatriate the Lao-Hmong at Wat Tham Krabok back to the communist regime in Laos that the Lao-Hmong refugees fled. This effort drew opposition from several human rights groups, and some key Hmong organizations.

Lao and Hmong human scholar and advocate, Vang Pobzeb, of the US Lao Human Rights Council, participated in a number of research missions with Philip Smith and The Centre for Public Policy Analysis, as well as Congressmen Vento and Gunderson, to the Lao and Hmong refugee camps in Thailand and to Wat Tham Krabok during the 1980s and 1990s. US Senator Paul Wellstone of Minnesota and others in the US Senate were active in raising concerns about egregious human rights violations in Laos and the plight of Lao and Hmong refugees and asylum seekers who fled Laos to refugee camps in Thailand and to Wat Tham Krabok.

Michael Johns, a former Heritage Foundation foreign policy analyst and aide to former US President George H. W. Bush, helped oppose the forced repatriation, labeling it a "betrayal", since many Hmong had aided the United States during the secret war. While some Hmong were repatriated, most were resettled to the United States in 2004 and 2005, most moving to Minnesota, California, and Wisconsin. Presently only a couple of Hmong families live at Wat Tham Krabok.

Wat Tham Krabok was believed to have served as a possible center of armed resistance to the Lao government with a limited number of weapons allegedly smuggled to some Hmong and Laotian insurgents and opposition groups in Laos. Responding to these concerns, the Thai military deployed hundreds of troops to surround Wat Tham Krabok in April 2003. This action was undertaken despite elements of the Thai military—many of whose officers were sympathetic to the Laotian and Hmong dissidents, insurgents and resistance fighter groups—allegedly, continuing to actively help to provide weapons and logistical support to Laotian and Hmong groups in Laos who oppose the communist government in Vientiane. The Thai military and police fenced in the Hmong at Wat Tham Krabok with concertina wire in an effort to monitor and control entrance to it, before they were able to immigrate to the US in 2004 and 2005. The area is no longer fenced. Wat Tham Krabok's role as an alleged conduit for weapons and military support to Lao and Hmong military insurgents and dissident groups ended at Wat Tham Krabok and elsewhere in Thailand.

Wat Tham Krabok became an official wat (temple) in 2012. Vichien Gitiwanno (Luang Por Vichien) was named the first abbot of Wat Tham Krabok as an official temple recognized by the Thai government. The number of detox patients reached to 110,312 by the end of 2015.
