= Sombath Somphone =

Lao civil society member

- ສົມບັດ ສົມພອນ
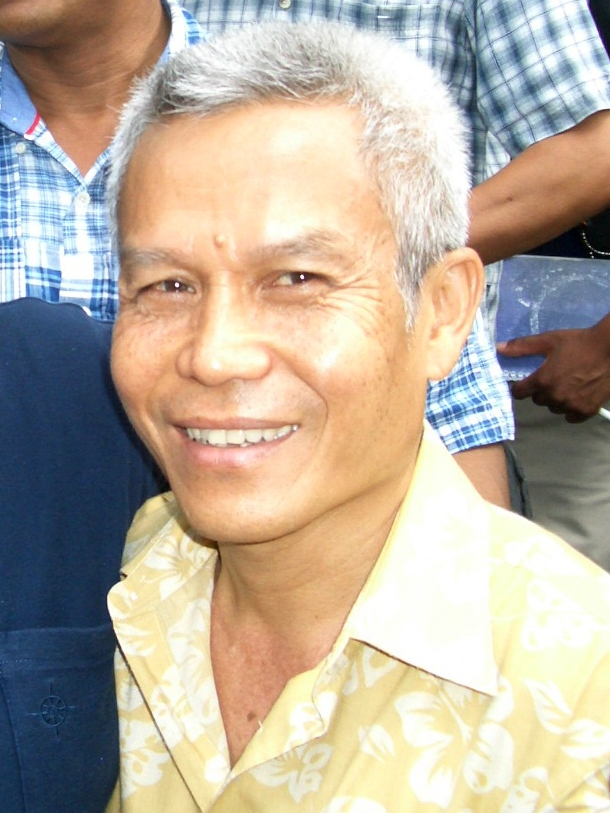
- Sombath Somphone in 2006
- Born: 17 February 1952; Khammouane Province, Laos, French Indochina
- Disappeared: 15 December 2012 (aged 60); Vientiane, Laos
- Status: Missing for 13 years, 9 months and 15 days
- Occupation: Community development worker

Sombath Somphone (Lao: ສົມບັດ ສົມພອນ, pronounced [sǒm.bǎt sǒm.pʰɔ́ːn]; born 17 February 1952) is an internationally acclaimed community development worker and prominent member of Lao civil society. Sombath was abducted from a Vientiane street in 2012 and has not been seen since.

== Early years ==
Sombath Somphone was born into a poor farming family, the eldest of eight brothers and sisters. He attended high school in the US state of Wisconsin. In the early-1970s he received a scholarship to study at the University of Hawaiʻi where he received a bachelor's degree in education (1974) and a master's degree in agriculture (1978).

== Career ==
Returning to his home country after the Vietnam War and the establishment of the Lao People's Democratic Republic, Sombath's earliest work was to demonstrate methods of sustainable farming that contribute to food security. He also pioneered the use of participatory rural appraisal techniques in Laos. In 1996 he was given permission by the Ministry of Education to establish the Participatory Development Training Center, PADETC, to provide training for young people and local government officials in community-based development. For some years, this was the only civil society organisation of this kind in Laos.

According to a biography of Sombath Somphone published in 2005, PADETC has undertaken numerous initiatives in promoting eco-friendly technologies and micro-enterprises, including the introduction of organic fertilizers, garbage recycling, fuel-efficient stoves, and new processing techniques for small agribusiness enterprises. These initiatives are undertaken as part of a learning program for teams of young volunteers and trainees (high school, college, and graduate levels). Through PADETC, the youth are afforded opportunities for learning leadership, teamwork, project management, and a diverse range of life-based, locally grounded knowledge in areas like environmental awareness, good farming practices, entrepreneurship, and urgent social issues like drug-abuse prevention.

Throughout his life, Sombath avoided any involvement in politics. In 2013, Sombath's wife issued a statement saying, "In many recent articles and statements related to Sombath’s disappearance, he has sometimes been billed as a human rights defender or a social/civil society activist. These terminologies do not accurately depict Sombath, the man or his work. It is true that Sombath through his projects has worked tirelessly to advance the well‐being and support the building of human resource capacity of the rural poor. But, Sombath's work has never been confrontational or antagonistic to government policy. Every project and every activity that Sombath has carried out, has been with the approval of the relevant government sector, and in cooperation with the local officials."

In later years, Sombath played an important role in introducing the concept of Gross National Happiness into Laos. In 2007, he was one of the organisers of the 3rd International Conference on Gross National Happiness, while in 2012 he was the senior adviser for a film called "Happy Laos", shown at the closing of the 9th Asia-Europe People's Forum. This work was closely related to Sombath's involvement in the International Network of Engaged Buddhists, led by his friend Sulak Sivaraksa.

== Recognition ==
In 2001, Sombath Somphone received the Human Resource Development Award for empowering the rural poor in Laos from the United Nations Economic and Social Commission for Asia and the Pacific.

In 2005, he was awarded the Ramon Magsaysay Award for Community Leadership. The citation for his award "recognizes his hopeful efforts to promote sustainable development in Laos by training and motivating its young people to become a generation of leaders". Sombath remains the only person from the Lao PDR to receive this award.

In 2010, the East-West Center recognised his work in their anniversary publication '50 Years, 50 Stories'. In 2011, Sombath made the keynote address at the 10th API Regional Workshop; API is a network of Asian Public Intellectuals supported by fellowships from the Nippon Foundation. In 2012, he made the keynote address at the 9th Meeting of the Asia-Europe People's Forum (AEPF) in Vientiane; the International Organising Committee of the AEPF have called Sombath "one of the most respected and influential voices for sustainable people-centred and just economic and social development in Laos".

== Disappearance and response ==
Sombath Somphone was abducted in Vientiane on the evening of 15 December 2012. CCTV footage shows that he was stopped by police and then taken away in a pickup truck. The Lao Government immediately denied responsibility for his disappearance.

The disappearance of Sombath Somphone was immediately followed by statements of concern from around the world. The European Union High Representative for Foreign Affairs, the Office of the United Nations High Commissioner for Human Rights, Parliamentarians from Asia and Europe, International nongovernmental organization (NGOs) – and many others – have urged the Lao Government to undertake all actions necessary to ensure the safe release of this respected figure. Winner of the Nobel Peace Prize, Desmond Tutu, wrote to the Lao Prime Minister, Thongsing Thammavong, calling for an urgent investigation but he received no response.

In January 2013, Amnesty International issued a call for urgent action. This was followed in June 2013 by the release of a 26-page briefing document titled Laos: Caught on Camera - the enforced disappearance of Sombath Somphone.

The Centre for Public Policy Analysis, a Washington, D.C., and Southeast Asia-based, non-governmental public policy research organization (NGO) has repeatedly issued appeals and statements calling on the Laos government and security forces to immediately release Sombath Somphone. The CPPA has frequently raised concerns about Sombath Somphone as well as human rights violations, and the persecution of Laotian and Hmong political and religious dissidents, in Laos.

One month after Sombath disappeared, United States Secretary of State, Hillary Clinton, issued a statement urging the Lao Government "to pursue a transparent investigation of this incident and to do everything in its power to bring about an immediate and safe return home to his family". On 24 March, John Kerry who had taken over as Secretary of State, issued a statement marking the 100th day since Sombath was abducted in which he said, "Regrettably, the continuing, unexplained disappearance of Mr. Sombath, a widely respected and inspiring Lao citizen who has worked for the greater benefit of all of his countrymen, raises questions about the Lao government’s commitment to the rule of law and to engage responsibly with the world."

Three delegations of parliamentarians from Asia and Europe visited Vientiane in 2013 to discuss Sombath's disappearance with the Lao Government. Following the first visit in January, Walden Bello, member of Congress from the Philippines and founder of Focus on the Global South, stated that "we are far from satisfied with the answers we got". Dutch Senator, Tuur Elzinga, said after the visit in March, "If Lao officials think the issue of Sombath’s disappearance will go away, they are wrong." In September, a third delegation consisting of representatives from Denmark and Belgium, concluded that "the Lao authorities have so far not shown adequate willingness or capacity to find a solution to this case and have refused any offer of technical assistance for the investigation".

During the High-Level Round Table Meeting with the Government of Laos held in Vientiane in November 2013, a number of foreign donors expressed their concern about the disappearance of Sombath. The statement from the European Development Partners called upon the Lao Government "to conduct a comprehensive and transparent investigation of this case and to fully cooperate with UN bodies such as the Working Group on Enforced Disappearances in Geneva".

On 15 December 2013, the one-year anniversary of Sombath's disappearance was marked by new statements from the governments of Switzerland, the UK, and the US, and demonstrations outside the Lao Embassies in Bangkok, Tokyo and Canberra. Amnesty International issued another appeal for action, while 62 Asian NGOs called for a new investigation. At the same time, the United Nations Special Rapporteur on the rights to freedom of peaceful assembly and of association, called on the Government of Lao PDR "to fully cooperate with the Human Rights Council and its Special Procedures, particularly as it seeks election to the Human Rights Council for 2016."

International media coverage of Sombath's disappearance includes reports by the BBC, Al Jazeera, Fox News, Deutsche Welle, Le Monde, The Guardian, The Wall Street Journal, ABC Australia and others.

== See also ==
- Houayheuang Xayabouly
- Sivanxai Phommalath
- Anousa Luangsuphom
- Od Sayavong
- Sisay Luangmonda
- List of people who disappeared mysteriously: post-1970
