= Kingdom of Laos =

Constitutional monarchy in Asia, 1947–1975

Coordinates: 17°58′N 102°36′E

Kingdom of Laos ພຣະຣາຊອານາຈັກຣ໌ລາວ (Lao) Royaume du Laos (French)
- 1947–1975
- Flag Coat of arms
- Anthem: ເພງຊາດລາວ; Pheng Xat Lao "Hymn of the Lao People" (Note: Original lyrics used until 1975.)
- Status: French protectorate (1947–1953); Independent state (1953–1975)
- Capital: Vientiane (administrative); Luang Phabang (royal)
- Largest city: Vientiane
- Official languages: Lao; French
- Spoken languages: Lao; Hmong; Khmu; French
- Ethnic groups: Lao; Khmu; Hmong; Phouthai; Tai; Makong; Katang; Lue; Akha
- Religion: Buddhism (official); Tai folk religion Christianity; Other/Irreligion
- Demonyms: Laotian; Lao
- Government: Constitutional monarchy
- De facto leader
  - 1959–1960: Phoumi Nosavan
  - 1960: Kong Le
  - 1960–1962: Phoumi Nosavan
- King
  - 1946–1959 (first): Sisavang Vong
  - 1959–1975 (last): Sisavang Vatthana
- Prime Minister
  - 1947–1948 (first): Souvannarath
  - 1962–1975 (last): Souvanna Phouma (Note: Held the position several times.)
- Legislature: Parliament
  - Upper house: Royal Council
  - Lower house: National Assembly
- History
  - Unification: 11 May 1947
  - Independence: 22 October 1953
  - Recognized: 21 July 1954
  - United Nations admission: 14 December 1955
  - Pathet Lao takeover of Vientiane: 23 August 1975
  - Lao PDR established: 2 December 1975

Area
  - Total: 236,800 km^{2} (91,400 sq mi)

Population
- 3,100,000
- Currency: Kip (₭) (LAK)
- Time zone: UTC+7 (ICT)
- Date format: dmy
- Calling code: +856
- ISO 3166 code: LA
Preceded by	Succeeded by
French protectorate of Laos; French Indochina	Lao People's Democratic Republic
- Today part of: Laos

The Kingdom of Laos was the former government of Laos from 1947 to 1975. Located in Southeast Asia at the heart of the Indochinese Peninsula, it was bordered by Burma and China to the northwest, North Vietnam to the east, Cambodia to the southeast, and Thailand to the west and southwest. The country was governed as a constitutional monarchy beginning with its independence on 22 October 1953. It survived until 2 December 1975, when its last king, Sisavang Vatthana, surrendered the throne to the Pathet Lao during the civil war in Laos, who abolished the monarchy in favour of a Marxist–Leninist state called the Lao People's Democratic Republic.

Given self-rule with the new Constitution in 1947 as part of the French Union and a federation with the rest of French Indochina, the 1953 Franco-Lao Treaty finally established a sovereign, independent Laos, but did not stipulate who would rule the country. In the years that followed, three groups, led by the so-called Three Princes, contended for power: the neutralists under Prince Souvanna Phouma, the right-wing party under Prince Boun Oum of Champassak, and the left-wing, North Vietnamese-backed Pathet Lao under Prince Souphanouvong and future Prime Minister Kaysone Phomvihane.

The Pathet Lao eventually emerged victorious in the Laotian Civil War and established the Lao People's Democratic Republic in 1975.

== History ==
The Kingdom of Laos was officially proclaimed when the new Constitution was promulgated in 1947, as part of the colonial French Union, and obtained full independence in 1953. The monarchy lasted until 2 December 1975, when the last king Sisavang Vatthana abdicated the throne to the Pathet Lao, who abolished the kingdom and proclaimed Laos as a communist state.

== Government ==
Following the Franco-Lao Treaty of 1953, which gave Laos independence, the Royal Lao Government took control of the country. This treaty established a constitutional monarchy, with Sisavang Vong as King and Prince Souvanna Phouma as Prime Minister.

Many attempts were made by the Three Princes and King Sisavang Vatthana to establish a coalition government. The First Government of National Unity was established in 1958 under Prince Souvanna Phouma, but collapsed after two months. The Prime Minister, who under the constitution appointed his ministers and received advice from the King, made a deal with his brother Prince Souphanouvong.

Souvanna Phouma gave the Communists two seats in the Cabinet, and in return Souphanouvong would integrate 1,500 of his 6,000 Communist troops into the royal army. Prince Souphanouvong was given the post of Minister of Planning, Reconstruction and Urbanization, while another member of the Communist Party was named Minister of Religion and Fine Arts.

The legislature of the Kingdom was bicameral.

== Military ==
The Kingdom of Laos was divided into five military regions. The Royal Lao Armed Forces were responsible for the defense of the country, comprising three branches of service: the Royal Lao Army, the Royal Lao Navy, and the Royal Lao Air Force, which was under the control of the Ministry of Defence in Vientiane.

The United States supplied the Royal Lao Navy with twenty river patrol boats and sixteen amphibious landing craft. Between 1962 and 1971, the United States provided Laos with an estimated US$500 million in military assistance.

== Foreign relations ==
The Royal Lao Government had close relations with the United States, which gave the country aid and assisted it in the campaign against the Pathet Lao and the North Vietnamese Communist movement. During 1957, the United States spent more per capita on foreign aid for Laos than it had on any other nation. That worked out as US$150 per Laotian, twice the average person's annual income. Some of the money went to support pro-American candidates in an election, while other money went to a program to support the local currency, the kip.

King Savang Vatthana visited the United States in 1963 to meet with President Kennedy.

Laos was also supported by France, Australia, Burma, Thailand and Japan.

== North Vietnamese invasion of Laos and civil war ==
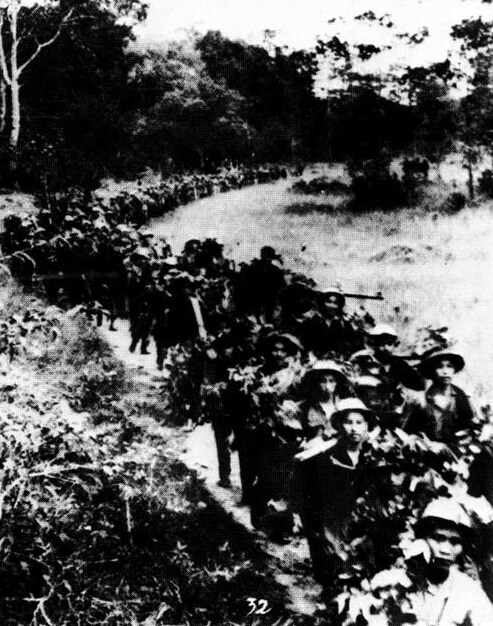
North Vietnamese troops march through Laos, 1967.

In 1960, amidst a series of rebellions, fighting broke out between the Royal Lao Army and the Soviet Union-backed, communist Pathet Lao, a second Provisional Government of National Unity formed by Prince Souvanna Phouma in 1962 proved to be unsuccessful, and the situation steadily deteriorated thereafter as the conflict in Laos became a focus for superpower rivalry. During the North Vietnamese invasion of Laos, the Pathet Lao were backed militarily by the People's Army of Vietnam (PAVN) and Vietcong.

Laos was also dragged into the Vietnam War after parts of Laos were invaded and occupied by North Vietnam for use as a supply route for its war against South Vietnam. In response, the United States initiated a bombing campaign against the North Vietnamese positions, supported regular and irregular anticommunist forces in Laos, including those led by Hmong General Vang Pao, and supported Army of the Republic of Vietnam incursions into Laos. It also provided supplies, training and funding for the central government.

In 1968, the PAVN launched a multi-division attack to help the Pathet Lao fight the Royal Lao Army. The attack resulted in the army largely demobilizing, leaving the conflict to irregular forces raised by the United States and Thailand.

Massive aerial bombardment against Pathet Lao and PAVN forces was carried out by the United States. It has been reported that Laos was hit by an average of one B-52 bombload every eight minutes, 24 hours a day, between 1964 and 1973. US bombers dropped more ordnance on Laos in this period than was dropped during the entire Second World War. Of the 260 million bombs that rained down, particularly in Xiangkhouang Province on the Plain of Jars, some 80 million failed to explode and continue to injure and kill residents to this day.

Laos is the most heavily bombed country, per capita, in the world. Because it was particularly heavily affected by cluster bombs during this war, Laos was a strong advocate of the Convention on Cluster Munitions to ban the weapons and assist victims and hosted the First Meeting of States Parties to the convention in November 2010.

In 1975, the Pathet Lao, along with the PAVN and backed by the Soviet Union, overthrew the royalist Lao government, forcing King Savang Vatthana to abdicate on 2 December 1975.

== Fall of the government ==
A ceasefire was finally attained in February 1973, following the Paris Peace Accords between the United States and North Vietnam. In April 1974, another Provisional Government of National Unity was established, with Prince Souvanna Phouma as Prime Minister. However, by this time, Pathet Lao forces controlled large areas of the country, and following the fall of Saigon and Phnom Penh to communist forces in April 1975, removed any chances of a coalition government forming in Laos. Following the communist victories in both countries, they advanced on to Vientiane.

On 2 December 1975 in Vientiane, Prince Vong Savang submitted the letter of abdication of King Savang Vatthana to the Pathet Lao. The Lao People's Democratic Republic was established with Prince Souphanouvong as President. Kaysone Phomvihane acted as Prime Minister and Secretary-General of the Lao People's Revolutionary Party.

== Aftermath ==
About 30,000 to 40,000 citizens and members of the old government, including the royal family, were taken to re-education camps in remote areas of Laos. The King, Queen and Crown Prince all died in captivity.

== See also ==
- History of Laos since 1945
- Lao Veterans of America
- Laotian Royal Family
- Laos Memorial
- Hmong (disambiguation)
- Lao Veterans of America Institute
- Vang Pao
