= Hmong =

Hmong may refer to:

- Hmong people, an ethnic group living mainly in Southwest China, Vietnam, Laos, and Thailand
- Hmong cuisine
- Hmong customs and culture
  - Hmong music
  - Hmong textile art
- Hmong language, a continuum of closely related tongues/dialects
  - Hmong–Mien languages
  - Pahawh Hmong, an indigenous semi-syllabic script
  - Nyiakeng Puachue Hmong, a modern alphabetic script
- Hmong Americans, Americans of Hmong descent

== See also ==
- Hmong folk religion
- Hmong in Wisconsin
  - Hmong American Peace Academy
- Hmong Studies Journal
- Hong (disambiguation)
- Miao people
- Mong (disambiguation)
