= Hong guerreroi =

Scientific classification
- Domain: Eukaryota
- Kingdom: Animalia
- Phylum: Arthropoda
- Class: Insecta
- Order: Coleoptera
- Suborder: Polyphaga
- Infraorder: Cucujiformia
- Family: Coccinellidae
- Genus: Hong
- Species: H. guerreroi

Binomial name
- Hong guerreroi González & Escalona, 2013

Species of beetle

Hong guerreroi is a species of ladybird beetle which is in the genus Hong which has been rarely found and sighted, it was first described in 2013 in the province of Cauquenes Los Ruiles National Reserve.

== Food ==
H. guerreroi is thought to feed off of coccids, like many other species from the tribe Microweiseini.

== See also ==
- Hong
