= Stanisław Adam Ślipiński =

Polish entomologist (born 1956)

- Born: November 13, 1956; Żurawica, Poland
- Citizenship: Poland, Australia
- Education: Warsaw University of Life Sciences (SGGW)
- Known for: Systematics and evolution of beetles
- Awards: Medal "For Merit for the Development of the Polish Entomological Society" (1998)
- Scientific career
- Fields: Coleopterology
- Workplaces: Museum and Institute of Zoology, Polish Academy of Sciences; University of Zielona Góra; Commonwealth Scientific and Industrial Research Organisation (Australia)
- Thesis: (1982)

Stanisław Adam Ślipiński (born 13 November 1956) is a Polish entomologist specializing in coleopterology (the study of beetles).

== Biography ==
He earned his Master of Engineering degree in 1980 from the Warsaw University of Life Sciences (SGGW). He received his Ph.D. in 1982 at the Institute of Systematics and Evolution of Animals, Polish Academy of Sciences in Kraków. In 1993 he obtained his habilitation at the University of Wrocław based on the first part of his world monograph of the Cerylonidae family. He later became director of the Museum and Institute of Zoology, Polish Academy of Sciences, where he was granted the title of professor in 2000. He also worked at the Institute of Biotechnology and Environmental Protection, University of Zielona Góra.

Between 1995 and 2002, he was a member of the Zoological Committee of the Polish Academy of Sciences (PAN). In 1998 he received the medal "For Merit for the Development of the Polish Entomological Society". He is currently a research scientist at the Commonwealth Scientific and Industrial Research Organisation (CSIRO) in Australia.

Ślipiński is the author of over 80 original scientific publications, mainly on the systematics and evolutionary biology of beetles belonging to the superfamilies Tenebrionoidea, Cleroidea, and Coccinelloidea, especially the families Zopheridae, Cerylonidae, Coccinellidae, and Nosodendridae. He has described numerous new taxa for science, including subfamilies, genera, and species. He is also the author of four volumes in the series Keys to the Identification of Polish Insects.

== Species named in his honor ==
Several beetle species have been named in his honor, including Aphanocephalus slipinskii, Baconia slipinskii, Catogenus slipinskii, Colydium slipinskii, Diodesma slipinskii, Diomus slipinskii, Eniclases slipinskii, Hong slipinskii, Hylis slipinskii, Lema slipinskii, Nosodendron slipinskii, Papuaepilachna slipinskii, Rhyzobius slipinskii, and Trichodryas slipinskii.
