= Nyiakeng Puachue Hmong (Unicode block) =

- Range: U+1E100..U+1E14F (80 code points)
- Plane: SMP
- Scripts: Nyiakeng Puachue Hmong
- Assigned: 71 code points
- Unused: 9 reserved code points

Unicode version history
- 12.0 (2019): 71 (+71)

Unicode documentation
- Code chart ∣ Web page

Nyiakeng Puachue Hmong is a Unicode block containing characters devised in the 1980s for writing the White Hmong and Green Hmong languages.

Nyiakeng Puachue Hmong^{[1]}^{[2]} Official Unicode Consortium code chart (PDF)
	0	1	2	3	4	5	6	7	8	9	A	B	C	D	E	F
U+1E10x	𞄀	𞄁	𞄂	𞄃	𞄄	𞄅	𞄆	𞄇	𞄈	𞄉	𞄊	𞄋	𞄌	𞄍	𞄎	𞄏
U+1E11x	𞄐	𞄑	𞄒	𞄓	𞄔	𞄕	𞄖	𞄗	𞄘	𞄙	𞄚	𞄛	𞄜	𞄝	𞄞	𞄟
U+1E12x	𞄠	𞄡	𞄢	𞄣	𞄤	𞄥	𞄦	𞄧	𞄨	𞄩	𞄪	𞄫	𞄬			
U+1E13x	𞄰	𞄱	𞄲	𞄳	𞄴	𞄵	𞄶	𞄷	𞄸	𞄹	𞄺	𞄻	𞄼	𞄽		
U+1E14x	𞅀	𞅁	𞅂	𞅃	𞅄	𞅅	𞅆	𞅇	𞅈	𞅉					𞅎	𞅏
Notes: 1. As of Unicode version 16.0; 2. Grey areas indicate non-assigned code points

== History ==
The following Unicode-related documents record the purpose and process of defining specific characters in the Nyiakeng Puachue Hmong block:

Version	Final code points (Note: Proposed code points and characters names may differ from final code points and names)	Count	L2 ID	WG2 ID	Document
12.0	U+1E100..1E12C, 1E130..1E13D, 1E140..1E149, 1E14E..1E14F	71	L2/16-070	N4710	Everson, Michael (2016-03-19), Preliminary proposal for encoding the Cher Vang Hmong script in the SMP
12.0	U+1E100..1E12C, 1E130..1E13D, 1E140..1E149, 1E14E..1E14F	71	L2/17-002R3	N4780R3	Everson, Michael (2017-02-15), Proposal to encode the Nyiakeng Puachue Hmong
12.0	U+1E100..1E12C, 1E130..1E13D, 1E140..1E149, 1E14E..1E14F	71	L2/17-037		Anderson, Deborah; Whistler, Ken; Pournader, Roozbeh; Glass, Andrew; Iancu, Laurențiu; Moore, Lisa; Liang, Hai; Ishida, Richard; Misra, Karan; McGowan, Rick (2017-01-21), "10. Hniakeng Puachue Hmong", Recommendations to UTC #150 January 2017 on Script Proposals
12.0	U+1E100..1E12C, 1E130..1E13D, 1E140..1E149, 1E14E..1E14F	71	L2/17-153		Anderson, Deborah (2017-05-17), "10. Nyiakeng Puachue Hmong", Recommendations to UTC #151 May 2017 on Script Proposals
12.0	U+1E100..1E12C, 1E130..1E13D, 1E140..1E149, 1E14E..1E14F	71	L2/17-103		Moore, Lisa (2017-05-18), "C.4", UTC #151 Minutes
12.0	U+1E100..1E12C, 1E130..1E13D, 1E140..1E149, 1E14E..1E14F	71	L2/19-008		Moore, Lisa (2019-02-08), "Action Item 158-A111", UTC #158 Minutes, "Update the general category of U+1E14F NYIAKENG PUACHUE HMONG CIRCLED CA from gc="Lo" to "So", for Unicode version 12.0."
