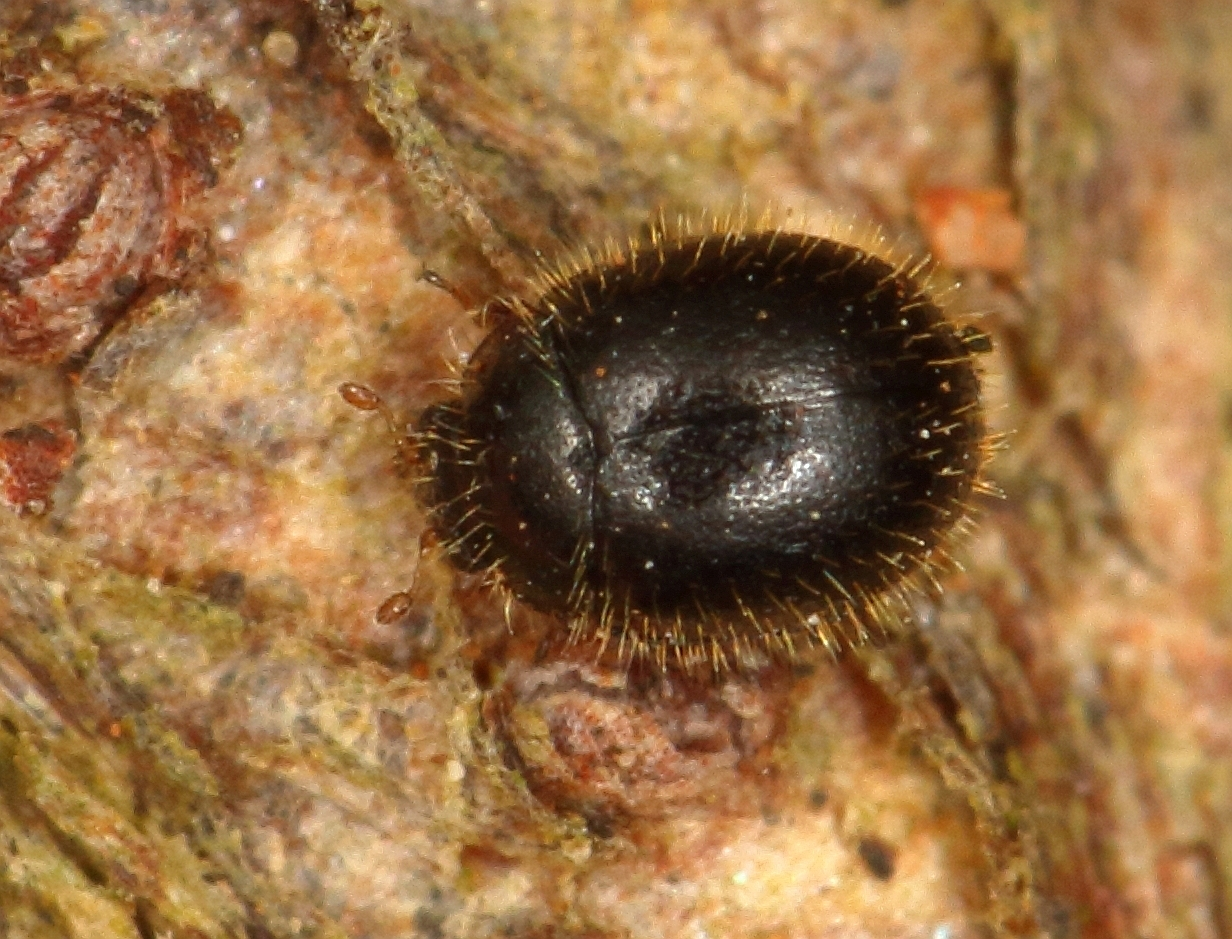
- Microfreudea cyclica

Scientific classification
- Kingdom: Animalia
- Phylum: Arthropoda
- Class: Insecta
- Order: Coleoptera
- Suborder: Polyphaga
- Infraorder: Cucujiformia
- Family: Coccinellidae
- Subfamily: Microweiseinae
- Tribe: Microweiseini; Leng, 1920

Genera
- See text

Synonyms
- Sukunahikonini Kamiya, 1960

= Microweiseini =

Tribe of beetles

Microweiseini is a tribe of ladybird beetles.

== Genera ==
The taxonomy of this group has recently been revised.

- Allenius
- Cathedrana
- Coccidophilus
- Gordoneus
- Hong
- Microcapillata
- Microfreudea
- Microweisea
- Nipus
- Paracoelopterus
- Paraphellus
- Parasidis
- Pharellus
- Sarapidus
- Scymnomorphus
- Stictospilus

Fossil genera:

- Baltosidis gen. nov.
  - B. damgaardi sp. nov.
  - B. damzeni sp. nov.
  - B. szadziewskii sp. nov.

Amongst the genera that have been included within the tribe are:

- Cryptoweisea
- Diloponis
- Pseudosmilia
