= Microweisea coccidivora =

Scientific classification
- Kingdom: Animalia
- Phylum: Arthropoda
- Class: Insecta
- Order: Coleoptera
- Suborder: Polyphaga
- Infraorder: Cucujiformia
- Family: Coccinellidae
- Genus: Microweisea
- Species: M. coccidivora

Binomial name
- Microweisea coccidivora (Ashmead, 1880)

Synonyms
- Hyperaspidius coccidivora Ashmead, 1880

Species of beetle

Microweisea coccidivora is a species of beetle of the family Coccinellidae. It is found in North America, where it has been recorded from Florida, Georgia and South Carolina.

== Description ==
Adults reach a length of about 0.8–1.0 mm. They have a yellowish red body, with base and apex of the elytra dark brown and a yellowish brown median area.
