= Allenius =

Scientific classification
- Domain: Eukaryota
- Kingdom: Animalia
- Phylum: Arthropoda
- Class: Insecta
- Order: Coleoptera
- Suborder: Polyphaga
- Infraorder: Cucujiformia
- Family: Coccinellidae
- Subfamily: Microweiseinae
- Tribe: Microweiseini
- Genus: Allenius; Escalona & Ślipiński, 2012

Species
- Allenius iviei Escalona & Ślipiński, 2012

Genus of beetles

Allenius is a genus of lady beetles in the family Coccinellidae, containing a single species, Allenius iviei.

Allenius iviei, known as the enigma ladybeetle is found in the U.S. states of Idaho and Montana. It is one of the rarest insects of the United States and was discovered in 2009. The pronotal plate of this species is very elongated, and easily conceals the head from above. The species is unique in the ability to tuck its head into its thorax for protection.
