= Hong glorious =

Scientific classification
- Domain: Eukaryota
- Kingdom: Animalia
- Phylum: Arthropoda
- Class: Insecta
- Order: Coleoptera
- Suborder: Polyphaga
- Infraorder: Cucujiformia
- Family: Coccinellidae
- Genus: Hong
- Species: H. glorious

Binomial name
- Hong glorious Ślipiński, 2007

Species of beetle

Hong glorious is a species of ladybird beetle in the genus Hong.

== Taxonomy ==
The specific epithet is taken from the location and name of Mount Glorious.

== See also ==
- Hong
