= Microweisea minuta =

Scientific classification
- Kingdom: Animalia
- Phylum: Arthropoda
- Class: Insecta
- Order: Coleoptera
- Suborder: Polyphaga
- Infraorder: Cucujiformia
- Family: Coccinellidae
- Genus: Microweisea
- Species: M. minuta

Binomial name
- Microweisea minuta (Casey, 1899)

Synonyms
- Smilia minuta Casey, 1899; Pentilia caseyi Korschefsky, 1931

Species of beetle

Microweisea minuta is a species of beetle of the family Coccinellidae. It is found in Texas.

== Description ==
Adults reach a length of about 0.85–0.88 mm. They have a piceous coloured body, with the ventral surface dark brown.
