= Microweisea texana =

Scientific classification
- Kingdom: Animalia
- Phylum: Arthropoda
- Class: Insecta
- Order: Coleoptera
- Suborder: Polyphaga
- Infraorder: Cucujiformia
- Family: Coccinellidae
- Genus: Microweisea
- Species: M. texana

Binomial name
- Microweisea texana (Gordon, 1985)

Synonyms
- Gnathoweisea texana Gordon, 1985

Species of beetle

Microweisea texana is a species of lady beetle in the family Coccinellidae. It is found in North America, where it has been recorded from Texas.

== Description ==
Adults reach a length of about 1 mm. They have a dark brown body, with a nearly black head and pronotum.

== Etymology ==
The species name refers to the state in which the holotype was collected.
