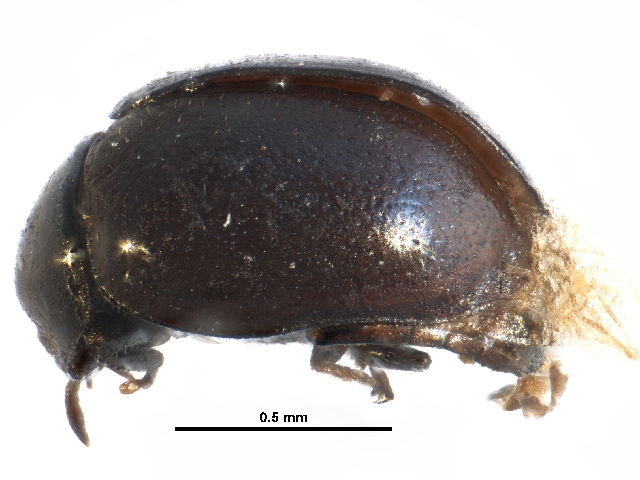
- Microweisea misella

Scientific classification
- Kingdom: Animalia
- Phylum: Arthropoda
- Class: Insecta
- Order: Coleoptera
- Suborder: Polyphaga
- Infraorder: Cucujiformia
- Family: Coccinellidae
- Genus: Microweisea
- Species: M. misella

Binomial name
- Microweisea misella (LeConte, 1878)

Synonyms
- Pentilia misella LeConte, 1878

= Microweisea misella =

Species of beetle

Microweisea misella is a species of lady beetle in the family Coccinellidae. It is found in North America. Darkly colored and very small at about 1 to 1.5mm in length, it occurs throughout southern Canada and much of the United States. It preys on Diaspididae scale insects on blueberry and other shrubs and trees.
