= Microweisea ferox =

Scientific classification
- Kingdom: Animalia
- Phylum: Arthropoda
- Class: Insecta
- Order: Coleoptera
- Suborder: Polyphaga
- Infraorder: Cucujiformia
- Family: Coccinellidae
- Genus: Microweisea
- Species: M. ferox

Binomial name
- Microweisea ferox (Gordon, 1985)

Synonyms
- Gnathoweisea ferox Gordon, 1985

Species of beetle

Microweisea ferox is a species of beetle of the family Coccinellidae. It is found in North America, where it has been recorded from Nevada.

== Description ==
Adults reach a length of about 1 mm. They have a dark brown body, while the head and pronotum are black.

== Etymology ==
The species name is derived from Latin and means fierce. This refers to the forbidding appearance of the head and mouthparts.
