= Scymnomorphus =

Scientific classification
- Kingdom: Animalia
- Phylum: Arthropoda
- Class: Insecta
- Order: Coleoptera
- Suborder: Polyphaga
- Infraorder: Cucujiformia
- Family: Coccinellidae
- Tribe: Microweiseini
- Genus: Scymnomorphus; Weise, 1897

Synonyms
- Scotoscymnus Weise, 1901; Orculus Sicard, 1931; Sukunahikona Kamiya, 1960; Hikonasukuna Sasaji, 1967

Genus of beetles

Scymnomorphus is a genus of minute lady beetles in the family Coccinellidae.

== Species ==
- Scymnomorphus apterus
- Scymnomorphus australis
- Scymnomorphus bicolor
- Scymnomorphus bimaculatus
- Scymnomorphus castaneus
- Scymnomorphus colombianus
- Scymnomorphus cuspidatus
- Scymnomorphus elongatus
- Scymnomorphus facetus
- Scymnomorphus fulvus
- Scymnomorphus glabripilosus
- Scymnomorphus globosus
- Scymnomorphus hirtus
- Scymnomorphus isolateralis
- Scymnomorphus japonicus
- Scymnomorphus kausi
- Scymnomorphus ker
- Scymnomorphus luteus
- Scymnomorphus magnopunctatus
- Scymnomorphus maximus
- Scymnomorphus minutus
- Scymnomorphus monticola
- Scymnomorphus niger
- Scymnomorphus orchidion
- Scymnomorphus papuensis
- Scymnomorphus parvulus
- Scymnomorphus perpusillus
- Scymnomorphus popei
- Scymnomorphus prapawan
- Scymnomorphus principensis
- Scymnomorphus punctatissimus
- Scymnomorphus punctipennis
- Scymnomorphus pygmaeus
- Scymnomorphus rotundatus
- Scymnomorphus stephensi
- Scymnomorphus storeyi
- Scymnomorphus subevanidus
- Scymnomorphus triangularis
- Scymnomorphus wagneri
- Scymnomorphus xiaomengyangus
- Scymnomorphus yadongensis
- Scymnomorphus zeijsti
