= Coccidophilus marginata =

Scientific classification
- Kingdom: Animalia
- Phylum: Arthropoda
- Class: Insecta
- Order: Coleoptera
- Suborder: Polyphaga
- Infraorder: Cucujiformia
- Family: Coccinellidae
- Genus: Coccidophilus
- Species: C. marginata

Binomial name
- Coccidophilus marginata (LeConte, 1878)

Synonyms
- Pentilia marginata LeConte, 1878

Species of beetle

Coccidophilus marginata is a species of beetle of the family Coccinellidae. It is found in North America, where it has been recorded from Maine, Michigan, New Jersey, New York and Pennsylvania.

== Description ==
Adults reach a length of about 1.20–1.25 mm. They have a light brown body.
