= Nipus planatus =

Scientific classification
- Kingdom: Animalia
- Phylum: Arthropoda
- Class: Insecta
- Order: Coleoptera
- Suborder: Polyphaga
- Infraorder: Cucujiformia
- Family: Coccinellidae
- Genus: Nipus
- Species: N. planatus

Binomial name
- Nipus planatus Gordon, 1970

Species of beetle

Nipus planatus is a species of beetle of the family Coccinellidae. It is found in North America, where it has been recorded from Colorado and Arizona.

== Description ==
Adults reach a length of about 1.19–1.24 mm. They have a brown body. The anterior and lateral borders of the pronotum are yellowish brown.
