= Nipus occiduus =

Scientific classification
- Kingdom: Animalia
- Phylum: Arthropoda
- Class: Insecta
- Order: Coleoptera
- Suborder: Polyphaga
- Infraorder: Cucujiformia
- Family: Coccinellidae
- Genus: Nipus
- Species: N. occiduus

Binomial name
- Nipus occiduus Gordon, 1970

Species of beetle

Nipus occiduus is a species of beetle of the family Coccinellidae. It is found in North America, where it has been recorded from Utah and Arizona.

== Description ==
Adults reach a length of about 1.20–1.24 mm. They have a piceous coloured body. The elytron has a large yellow spot and the anterior margin of the pronotum is yellowish brown.
