= Gordoneus schwarzi =

Scientific classification
- Kingdom: Animalia
- Phylum: Arthropoda
- Class: Insecta
- Order: Coleoptera
- Suborder: Polyphaga
- Infraorder: Cucujiformia
- Family: Coccinellidae
- Genus: Gordoneus
- Species: G. schwarzi

Binomial name
- Gordoneus schwarzi (Gordon, 1970)

Synonyms
- Gnathoweisea schwarzi Gordon, 1970; Microweisea schwarzi

Species of beetle

Gordoneus schwarzi is a species of beetle of the family Coccinellidae. It is found in North America, where it has been recorded from Arizona.

== Description ==
Adults reach a length of about 0.98–1.03 mm. They have a medium brown body, with a dark brown or piceous pronotum.
