= Scymnomorphus facetus =

Scientific classification
- Kingdom: Animalia
- Phylum: Arthropoda
- Class: Insecta
- Order: Coleoptera
- Suborder: Polyphaga
- Infraorder: Cucujiformia
- Family: Coccinellidae
- Genus: Scymnomorphus
- Species: S. facetus

Binomial name
- Scymnomorphus facetus (Gordon, 1977)

Synonyms
- Scotoscymnus facetus Gordon, 1977

Species of beetle

Scymnomorphus facetus is a species of beetle of the family Coccinellidae. It is found in Mexico (San Luis Potosi).

== Description ==
Adults reach a length of about 1.05 mm. Adults are dark reddish brown, while the head and pronotum are yellowish red.

== Etymology ==
The species name is a Latin adjective meaning fine, well made.
