= Coccidophilus cariba =

Scientific classification
- Kingdom: Animalia
- Phylum: Arthropoda
- Class: Insecta
- Order: Coleoptera
- Suborder: Polyphaga
- Infraorder: Cucujiformia
- Family: Coccinellidae
- Genus: Coccidophilus
- Species: C. cariba

Binomial name
- Coccidophilus cariba Gordon, 1978

Species of beetle

Coccidophilus cariba is a species of beetle of the family Coccinellidae. It is found in Antigua, Curaçao, Montserrat, St. Kitts and Nevis.

== Description ==
Adults reach a length of about 0.85–1.1 mm. Adults are brownish piceous, although the pronotum, head and lateral border of the elytron are reddish brown.

== Biology ==
Aspidiotus destructor is the most commonly recorded host for this species.

== Etymology ==
The species name refers to the Caribbean distribution.
