= Scymnomorphus elongatus =

Scientific classification
- Kingdom: Animalia
- Phylum: Arthropoda
- Class: Insecta
- Order: Coleoptera
- Suborder: Polyphaga
- Infraorder: Cucujiformia
- Family: Coccinellidae
- Genus: Scymnomorphus
- Species: S. elongatus

Binomial name
- Scymnomorphus elongatus (Gordon, 1977)

Synonyms
- Scotoscymnus elongatus Gordon, 1977

Species of beetle

Scymnomorphus elongatus is a species of beetle of the family Coccinellidae. It is found in Mexico, although it was described from Texas, based on specimens found on imported orchids.

== Description ==
Adults reach a length of about 1-1.2 mm. Adults are dark reddish brown with a yellowish brown head.

== Etymology ==
The species name is a Latin adjective referring to the elongate body form.
