= Coccidophilus atronitens =

Scientific classification
- Kingdom: Animalia
- Phylum: Arthropoda
- Class: Insecta
- Order: Coleoptera
- Suborder: Polyphaga
- Infraorder: Cucujiformia
- Family: Coccinellidae
- Genus: Coccidophilus
- Species: C. atronitens

Binomial name
- Coccidophilus atronitens (Casey, 1899)

Synonyms
- Smilia atronitens Casey, 1899; Smilia reversa Fall, 1901

Species of beetle

Coccidophilus atronitens is a species of lady beetle in the family Coccinellidae. It is found in North America, where it has been recorded from Colorado and Arizona to Oregon and California.

== Description ==
Adults reach a length of about 1.10-1.20 mm. They have a dark brown body and yellowish brown legs.
