= Scymnomorphus pygmaeus =

Scientific classification
- Kingdom: Animalia
- Phylum: Arthropoda
- Class: Insecta
- Order: Coleoptera
- Suborder: Polyphaga
- Infraorder: Cucujiformia
- Family: Coccinellidae
- Genus: Scymnomorphus
- Species: S. pygmaeus

Binomial name
- Scymnomorphus pygmaeus (Gordon, 1977)

Synonyms
- Scotoscymnus pygmaeus Gordon, 1977

Species of beetle

Scymnomorphus pygmaeus is a species of beetle of the family Coccinellidae. It is found in Honduras.

== Description ==
Adults reach a length of about 1 mm. Adults are dark reddish brown, although the pronotum is slightly paler. The head is yellowish brown and the legs are yellow.

== Etymology ==
The species name is a Latin adjective meaning dwarfed or pygmy.
