= Microweisea hageni =

Scientific classification
- Kingdom: Animalia
- Phylum: Arthropoda
- Class: Insecta
- Order: Coleoptera
- Suborder: Polyphaga
- Infraorder: Cucujiformia
- Family: Coccinellidae
- Genus: Microweisea
- Species: M. hageni

Binomial name
- Microweisea hageni (Gordon, 1985)

Synonyms
- Gnathoweisea hageni Gordon, 1985

Species of beetle

Microweisea hageni is a species of beetle of the family Coccinellidae. It is found in North America, where it has been recorded from California.

== Description ==
Adults reach a length of about 1.25-1.50 mm. They have a brown body, with the head and pronotum dark brown.

== Etymology ==
The species is named for Kenneth Hagen, the collector of the type.
