= Hong =

Hong may refer to:

== Places ==
- Høng, a town in Denmark
- Hong, Nigeria
- Hong River in China and Vietnam
- Lake Hong in China

== Surnames ==
- Hong (Chinese surname)
- Hong (Korean surname)

== Creatures ==
- Hamsa (bird), a mythical bird also known was hong
- Hong (rainbow-dragon), a two-headed dragon in Chinese mythology
- Hong (genus), a genus of ladybird

== Other uses ==
- Hong (business), general term for a 19th–20th century trading company based in Hong Kong, Macau or Canton
- Sister Hong, a man posing as a woman in Nanjing, China

== See also ==
- Hongmen (洪門), a Chinese fraternal organization
- Hong Kong, a city and a special administrative region in China
