= Microweisea ovalis =

Scientific classification
- Kingdom: Animalia
- Phylum: Arthropoda
- Class: Insecta
- Order: Coleoptera
- Suborder: Polyphaga
- Infraorder: Cucujiformia
- Family: Coccinellidae
- Genus: Microweisea
- Species: M. ovalis

Binomial name
- Microweisea ovalis (LeConte, 1878)

Synonyms
- Pentilia ovalis LeConte, 1878; Smilia felschei Weise, 1892

Species of beetle

Microweisea ovalis is a species of beetle of the family Coccinellidae. It is found in North America, where it has been recorded from Florida and Georgia.

== Description ==
Adults reach a length of about 0.95–1.05 mm. They have a brown body, with a piceous coloured elytral suture and yellowish brown legs.
