= Scymnomorphus stephensi =

Scientific classification
- Kingdom: Animalia
- Phylum: Arthropoda
- Class: Insecta
- Order: Coleoptera
- Suborder: Polyphaga
- Infraorder: Cucujiformia
- Family: Coccinellidae
- Genus: Scymnomorphus
- Species: S. stephensi

Binomial name
- Scymnomorphus stephensi (Gordon, 1977)

Synonyms
- Scotoscymnus stephensi Gordon, 1977

Species of beetle

Scymnomorphus stephensi is a species of beetle of the family Coccinellidae. It is found in Costa Rica and Panama.

== Description ==
Adults reach a length of about 1 mm. Adults are piceous, with a dark reddish brown head.

== Etymology ==
The species is named for the collector of the type series.
