= Microweisea suturalis =

Scientific classification
- Kingdom: Animalia
- Phylum: Arthropoda
- Class: Insecta
- Order: Coleoptera
- Suborder: Polyphaga
- Infraorder: Cucujiformia
- Family: Coccinellidae
- Genus: Microweisea
- Species: M. suturalis

Binomial name
- Microweisea suturalis (Schwarz, 1904)

Synonyms
- Pseudoweisea suturalis Schwarz, 1904

Species of beetle

Microweisea suturalis is a species of beetle of the family Coccinellidae. It is found in California.

== Description ==
Adults reach a length of about 1.0–1.1 mm. They have a piceous coloured body. The elytron is yellowish brown.

== Biology ==
It was introduced on Bermuda for the control of Lepidosaphes pallida and Carulaspis minima.
