= Microweisea micula =

Scientific classification
- Kingdom: Animalia
- Phylum: Arthropoda
- Class: Insecta
- Order: Coleoptera
- Suborder: Polyphaga
- Infraorder: Cucujiformia
- Family: Coccinellidae
- Genus: Microweisea
- Species: M. micula

Binomial name
- Microweisea micula (Gordon, 1985)

Synonyms
- Gnathoweisea micula Gordon, 1985

Species of beetle

Microweisea micula is a species of beetle of the family Coccinellidae. It is found in North America, where it has been recorded from Arizona and New Mexico.

== Description ==
Adults reach a length of about 1.05 mm. They have a light brown body, with the head, pronotum and ventral surface slightly darker brown.

== Etymology ==
The species name is derived from Latin mica (meaning crumb) and refers to the small size.
