= Scymnomorphus globosus =

Scientific classification
- Kingdom: Animalia
- Phylum: Arthropoda
- Class: Insecta
- Order: Coleoptera
- Suborder: Polyphaga
- Infraorder: Cucujiformia
- Family: Coccinellidae
- Genus: Scymnomorphus
- Species: S. globosus

Binomial name
- Scymnomorphus globosus (Gordon, 1977)

Synonyms
- Scotoscymnus globosus Gordon, 1977

Species of beetle

Scymnomorphus globosus is a species of beetle of the family Coccinellidae. It is native to Mexico, but was described from specimens intercepted in Texas.

== Description ==
Adults reach a length of about 0.82 mm. Adults are dark reddish brown, with the head and pronotum slightly paler.

== Etymology ==
The species name is a Latin adjective referring to the rounded body form.
