= Hong (beetle) =

Scientific classification
- Domain: Eukaryota
- Kingdom: Animalia
- Phylum: Arthropoda
- Class: Insecta
- Order: Coleoptera
- Suborder: Polyphaga
- Infraorder: Cucujiformia
- Family: Coccinellidae
- Subfamily: Microweiseinae
- Tribe: Microweiseini
- Genus: Hong; Ślipiński, 2007

Genus of beetles

Hong is a genus of ladybird beetles which contains three species, all of which have only been infrequently found.

== Species ==
The species of this genus differ from one another mostly in the shape of their bodies.

- Hong glorious Ślipiński, 2007
- Hong guerreroi Gonzalez & Escalona, 2013
- Hong slipinskii Gonzalez & Escalona, 2013

== See also ==
- Hong (disambiguation)
