= Microcapillata clypealis =

Scientific classification
- Kingdom: Animalia
- Phylum: Arthropoda
- Class: Insecta
- Order: Coleoptera
- Suborder: Polyphaga
- Infraorder: Cucujiformia
- Family: Coccinellidae
- Genus: Microcapillata
- Species: M. clypealis

Binomial name
- Microcapillata clypealis Gordon, 1977

Species of beetle

Microcapillata clypealis is a species of beetle in the family Coccinellidae. It is found in Mexico (San Luis Potosi).

== Description ==
Adults reach a length of about 1.16 mm. Adults are mostly yellowish brown, but the elytron is darker reddish brown.

== Etymology ==
The species name is a Latin adjective referring to the clypeus.
