= Stictospilus darwini =

Scientific classification
- Kingdom: Animalia
- Phylum: Arthropoda
- Class: Insecta
- Order: Coleoptera
- Suborder: Polyphaga
- Infraorder: Cucujiformia
- Family: Coccinellidae
- Genus: Stictospilus
- Species: S. darwini

Binomial name
- Stictospilus darwini Brèthes, 1925

Species of beetle

Stictospilus darwini is a species of beetle of the family Coccinellidae. It is found in Chile.
