= Nipus =

Scientific classification
- Kingdom: Animalia
- Phylum: Arthropoda
- Class: Insecta
- Order: Coleoptera
- Suborder: Polyphaga
- Infraorder: Cucujiformia
- Family: Coccinellidae
- Tribe: Microweiseini
- Genus: Nipus; Casey, 1899

Genus of beetles

Nipus is a genus of lady beetles in the family Coccinellidae. There are at least four described species in Nipus.

== Species ==
These four species belong to the genus Nipus:

- Nipus biplagiatus Casey, 1899
- Nipus niger Casey, 1899
- Nipus occiduus Gordon, 1970
- Nipus planatus Gordon, 1970
