= Coccidophilus =

Scientific classification
- Kingdom: Animalia
- Phylum: Arthropoda
- Class: Insecta
- Order: Coleoptera
- Suborder: Polyphaga
- Infraorder: Cucujiformia
- Family: Coccinellidae
- Tribe: Microweiseini
- Genus: Coccidophilus; Brethes, 1905

Synonyms
- Cryptoweisea Gordon, 1970; Pseudosmilia Brèthes, 1925

Genus of beetles

Coccidophilus is a genus of lady beetles in the family Coccinellidae.

== Species ==
These species belong to the genus Coccidophilus:

- Coccidophilus aimogastaensis González & Pedemonte, 2010
- Coccidophilus arrowi (Brèthes, 1925)
- Coccidophilus atronitens (Casey, 1899)
- Coccidophilus barrigai González, 2012
- Coccidophilus cariba Gordon, 1978
- Coccidophilus chilensis González, 2012
- Coccidophilus citricola Brèthes, 1905
- Coccidophilus ferrui González, 2012
- Coccidophilus lozadai González, 2012
- Coccidophilus luciae González, 2012
- Coccidophilus marginata (LeConte, 1878)
- Coccidophilus mendozai González, 2012
- Coccidophilus niger Duverger, 1986
- Coccidophilus occidentalis González, 2012
- Coccidophilus octomerus González, 2012
- Coccidophilus peninsularis (Gordon, 1970)
- Coccidophilus steparium Honour & González, 2016
- Coccidophilus transandinus González, 2012
- Coccidophilus vandenbergae González, 2012
