= Microweisea =

Scientific classification
- Kingdom: Animalia
- Phylum: Arthropoda
- Class: Insecta
- Order: Coleoptera
- Suborder: Polyphaga
- Infraorder: Cucujiformia
- Family: Coccinellidae
- Tribe: Microweiseini
- Genus: Microweisea; Cockerell, 1903

Synonyms
- Smilia Weise, 1892 (preocc.); Epismilia Cockerell, 1900 (preocc.); Pseudoweisea Cockerell in Schwarz, 1904; Gnathoweisea Gordon, 1970

Genus of beetles

Microweisea is a genus of minute lady beetles in the family Coccinellidae.

== Species ==
These species belong to the genus Microweisea:

- Microweisea capsularis González, 2012
- Microweisea coccidivora (Ashmead, 1880)
- Microweisea colombiana González, 2012
- Microweisea ferox (Gordon, 1985)
- Microweisea hageni (Gordon, 1985)
- Microweisea micula (Gordon, 1985)
- Microweisea minuta (Casey, 1899)
- Microweisea misella (LeConte, 1878)
- Microweisea ovalis (LeConte, 1878)
- Microweisea planiceps (Casey, 1899)
- Microweisea suturalis (Schwarz, 1904)
- Microweisea texana (Gordon, 1985)
