= Scymnomorphus colombianus =

Scientific classification
- Kingdom: Animalia
- Phylum: Arthropoda
- Class: Insecta
- Order: Coleoptera
- Suborder: Polyphaga
- Infraorder: Cucujiformia
- Family: Coccinellidae
- Genus: Scymnomorphus
- Species: S. colombianus

Binomial name
- Scymnomorphus colombianus (Gordon, 1977)

Synonyms
- Scotoscymnus colombianus Gordon, 1977

Species of beetle

Scymnomorphus colombianus is a species of beetle in the family Coccinellidae. It is native to Colombia, but was described from specimens found on orchids in Florida.

== Description ==
Adults reach a length of about 1 mm. Adults are dark reddish piceous, while the head and pronotum are reddish brown.

== Etymology ==
The species name is a Latin adjective referring to the country of origin.
