= Scymnomorphus perpusillus =

Scientific classification
- Kingdom: Animalia
- Phylum: Arthropoda
- Class: Insecta
- Order: Coleoptera
- Suborder: Polyphaga
- Infraorder: Cucujiformia
- Family: Coccinellidae
- Genus: Scymnomorphus
- Species: S. perpusillus

Binomial name
- Scymnomorphus perpusillus (Gordon, 1977)

Synonyms
- Scotoscymnus perpusillus Gordon, 1977

Species of beetle

Scymnomorphus perpusillus is a species of beetle of the family Coccinellidae. It is native to Colombia, but was described from specimens found on bananas in New York.

== Description ==
Adults reach a length of about 1 mm. Adults are black. The pronotum is dark reddish piceous and the head slightly paler.

== Etymology ==
The species name is a Latin adjective meaning very small.
