= Microweisea planiceps =

Scientific classification
- Kingdom: Animalia
- Phylum: Arthropoda
- Class: Insecta
- Order: Coleoptera
- Suborder: Polyphaga
- Infraorder: Cucujiformia
- Family: Coccinellidae
- Genus: Microweisea
- Species: M. planiceps

Binomial name
- Microweisea planiceps (Casey, 1899)

Synonyms
- Smilia planiceps Casey, 1899; Gnathoweisea planiceps

Species of beetle

Microweisea planiceps is a species of beetle of the family Coccinellidae. It is found in North America, where it has been recorded from Arizona and California.

== Description ==
Adults reach a length of about 0.85–1.10 mm. They have a dark brown or piceous coloured body.
