= Gordoneus =

Scientific classification
- Kingdom: Animalia
- Phylum: Arthropoda
- Class: Insecta
- Order: Coleoptera
- Suborder: Polyphaga
- Infraorder: Cucujiformia
- Family: Coccinellidae
- Tribe: Microweiseini
- Genus: Gordoneus; Escalona & Slipinski, 2012

Genus of beetles

Gordoneus is a genus of minute lady beetles in the family Coccinellidae.

== Species ==
- Gordoneus schwarzi (Gordon, 1970)
