= Nipus biplagiatus =

Scientific classification
- Kingdom: Animalia
- Phylum: Arthropoda
- Class: Insecta
- Order: Coleoptera
- Suborder: Polyphaga
- Infraorder: Cucujiformia
- Family: Coccinellidae
- Genus: Nipus
- Species: N. biplagiatus

Binomial name
- Nipus biplagiatus Casey, 1899

Species of beetle

Nipus biplagiatus is a species of lady beetle in the family Coccinellidae. It is found in North America, where it has been recorded from California.

== Description ==
Adults reach a length of about 1.25-1.50 mm. They have a piceous coloured body, while a large median area on the elytron, as well as the anterior margin of the pronotum are yellow.
