= Nipus niger =

Scientific classification
- Kingdom: Animalia
- Phylum: Arthropoda
- Class: Insecta
- Order: Coleoptera
- Suborder: Polyphaga
- Infraorder: Cucujiformia
- Family: Coccinellidae
- Genus: Nipus
- Species: N. niger

Binomial name
- Nipus niger Casey, 1899

Species of beetle

Nipus niger is a species of beetle of the family Coccinellidae. It is found in North America, where it has been recorded from California.

== Description ==
Adults reach a length of about 1.05–1.10 mm. They have a brownish piceous body, while the anterior margin of the pronotum is yellowish brown.
