= Sarapidus australis =

Scientific classification
- Kingdom: Animalia
- Phylum: Arthropoda
- Class: Insecta
- Order: Coleoptera
- Suborder: Polyphaga
- Infraorder: Cucujiformia
- Family: Coccinellidae
- Genus: Sarapidus
- Species: S. australis

Binomial name
- Sarapidus australis Gordon, 1977

Species of beetle

Sarapidus australis is a species of beetle in the family Coccinellidae. It is found in Chile.

== Description ==
Adults reach a length of about 1.40 mm. Adults are piceous, but the elytron is yellowish red with the basal one-fourth and apical area piceous.

== Etymology ==
The species name is a Latin adjective referring to the southern distribution of this species.
