= Microcapillata =

Scientific classification
- Kingdom: Animalia
- Phylum: Arthropoda
- Class: Insecta
- Order: Coleoptera
- Suborder: Polyphaga
- Infraorder: Cucujiformia
- Family: Coccinellidae
- Tribe: Microweiseini
- Genus: Microcapillata; Gordon, 1977

Genus of beetles

Microcapillata is a genus of minute lady beetles in the family Coccinellidae.

== Species ==
- Microcapillata clypealis Gordon, 1977
