= Coccidophilus arrowi =

Scientific classification
- Kingdom: Animalia
- Phylum: Arthropoda
- Class: Insecta
- Order: Coleoptera
- Suborder: Polyphaga
- Infraorder: Cucujiformia
- Family: Coccinellidae
- Genus: Coccidophilus
- Species: C. arrowi

Binomial name
- Coccidophilus arrowi (Brèthes, 1925)

Synonyms
- Pseudosmilia arrowi Brèthes, 1925

Species of beetle

Coccidophilus arrowi is a species of beetle of the family Coccinellidae. It is found in Chile.

== Description ==
Adults are somewhat pubescent and darkly ferruginous with a longitudinal black mark on the pronotum and a black patch around the scutellum.
