= Sarapidus =

Scientific classification
- Missing taxonomy template (fix): Sarapidus

Genus of beetles

Sarapidus is a genus of minute lady beetles in the family Coccinellidae.

== Species ==
- Sarapidus australis Gordon, 1977
