= Nyiakeng Puachue Hmong =

Writing system

Nyiakeng Puachue Hmong 𞄀𞄩𞄰𞄁𞄓𞄱𞄂𞄤𞄳𞄬𞄃𞄤𞄳
- Script type: Alphabet
- Creator: Chervang Kong
- Created: 1980s
- Direction: Left-to-right
- Languages: White Hmong, Green Hmong

ISO 15924
- ISO 15924: Hmnp (451), Nyiakeng Puachue Hmong

Unicode
- Unicode alias: Nyiakeng Puachue Hmong
- Unicode range: U+1E100–U+1E14F

Nyiakeng Puachue Hmong (Hmong: 𞄐𞄦𞄲𞄤𞄎𞄫𞄰𞄚𞄧𞄲𞄤𞄔𞄬𞄱; RPA: Ntawv Nyiajkeeb Puajtxwm Hmoob) is an alphabet script devised for White Hmong and Green Hmong in the 1980s by Chervang Kong for use within his United Christians Liberty Evangelical Church. The church, which moved around California, Minnesota, Wisconsin, North Carolina, Colorado, and other states, has used the script in printed material and videos. It is reported to have some use in Laos, Thailand, Vietnam, France, and Australia.

The script bears strong resemblance to Thai script in structure and form and characters inspired from the Hebrew alphabet; the characters themselves are different. It contains 36 consonant characters, 9 vowel characters, and 7 combining tone characters. There are also 5 characters for determinatives used to indicate that the preceding noun is the name of a person, place, thing, vertebrate or invertebrate animal, or a pet name for the animal. Determinatives, which are not pronounced, help distinguish homophones. They appear as the last character in a word, and are not separated by a space.

== Terminology ==
The term Ntawv Nyiajkeeb Puajtxwm Hmoob means ‘Genesis Complete Hmong script’; ntawv means ‘letter’, nyiajkeeb means ‘genesis’, puajtxwm means ‘complete’, and hmoob is ‘Hmong’. The script is also called Hmong Kong Hmong, Pa Dao Hmong (also the name of a different Hmong script), and 'the Chervang script', after its inventor.

== Consonants ==
𞄀	𞄁	𞄂	𞄃
MA	TSA	NTA	TA
𞄄	𞄅	𞄆	𞄇
HA	NA	XA	NKA
𞄈	𞄉	𞄊	𞄋
CA	LA	SA	ZA
𞄌	𞄍	𞄎	𞄏
NCA	NTSA	KA	DA
𞄐	𞄑	𞄒	𞄓
NYA	NRA	VA	NTXA
𞄔	𞄕	𞄖	𞄗
TXA	FA	RA	QA
𞄘	𞄙	𞄚	𞄛
YA	NQA	PA	XYA
𞄜	𞄝	𞄞	𞄟
NPA	DLA	NPLA	HAH
𞄠	𞄡	𞄢	𞄣
MLA	PLA	GA	RRA

== Vowels ==
𞄤	𞄥	𞄦	𞄧	𞄨	𞄩	𞄪	𞄫	𞄬
A	AA	I	U	O	OO	E	EE	W

== Tone markers ==
𞄰	𞄱	𞄲	𞄳		𞄴	𞄵	𞄶
high-level	low-glottalized	high-falling	mid-rising	mid-level	low-level	falling-breathy	low-rising
b	m	j	v	Ø	s	g	d

== Noun indicators ==
𞄷	𞄸	𞄹	𞄺	𞄻
person	thing	place	vertebrate	invertebrate
OOV	PES	KHABTHEEB	KHUAMLUAS	POOS

== Digits ==
𞅀	𞅁	𞅂	𞅃	𞅄	𞅅	𞅆	𞅇	𞅈	𞅉
0	1	2	3	4	5	6	7	8	9

== Punctuation marks ==
𞄼	𞄽
repeat	syllable lengthener
XW XW	SEEV

== Logograms ==
𞅎	𞅏
Currency	Ownership

== Unicode ==
Nyiakeng Puachue Hmong script was added to the Unicode Standard on March 5, 2019 with the release of version 12.0.

The Unicode block for Nyiakeng Puachue Hmong is U+1E100–U+1E14F:

Nyiakeng Puachue Hmong^{[1]}^{[2]} Official Unicode Consortium code chart (PDF)
	0	1	2	3	4	5	6	7	8	9	A	B	C	D	E	F
U+1E10x	𞄀	𞄁	𞄂	𞄃	𞄄	𞄅	𞄆	𞄇	𞄈	𞄉	𞄊	𞄋	𞄌	𞄍	𞄎	𞄏
U+1E11x	𞄐	𞄑	𞄒	𞄓	𞄔	𞄕	𞄖	𞄗	𞄘	𞄙	𞄚	𞄛	𞄜	𞄝	𞄞	𞄟
U+1E12x	𞄠	𞄡	𞄢	𞄣	𞄤	𞄥	𞄦	𞄧	𞄨	𞄩	𞄪	𞄫	𞄬			
U+1E13x	𞄰	𞄱	𞄲	𞄳	𞄴	𞄵	𞄶	𞄷	𞄸	𞄹	𞄺	𞄻	𞄼	𞄽		
U+1E14x	𞅀	𞅁	𞅂	𞅃	𞅄	𞅅	𞅆	𞅇	𞅈	𞅉					𞅎	𞅏
Notes 1.As of Unicode version 18.0 2.Grey areas indicate non-assigned code points

== Fonts ==
- Nyiakeng-Puachue-Hmong-Fonts
- Download Nyiakeng Puachue Hmong fonts
