= Hong slipinskii =

Scientific classification
- Kingdom: Animalia
- Phylum: Arthropoda
- Class: Insecta
- Order: Coleoptera
- Suborder: Polyphaga
- Infraorder: Cucujiformia
- Family: Coccinellidae
- Genus: Hong
- Species: H. slipinskii

Binomial name
- Hong slipinskii González & Escalona, 2013

Species of beetle

Hong slipinskii is a species of beetle in the genus Hong which is known from specimens collected from Chile, the specific epithet honours Andrew Ślipiński, the authority for genus Hong.

== See also ==
- Hong
