= Stictospilus =

Scientific classification
- Missing taxonomy template (fix): Stictospilus

Genus of beetles

Stictospilus is a genus of minute lady beetles in the family Coccinellidae.

== Species ==
- Stictospilus darwini Brèthes, 1925
