= Nanjing Sister Hong incident =

2025 scandal in China

- Native name: 南京红姐事件
- Date: July 6, 2025
- Location: Nanjing, China
- Type: Scandal
- Motive: Profit
- Arrests: 1
- Accused: A 38-year-old man surnamed Jiao (Sister Hong)

The Nanjing Sister Hong incident (simplified Chinese: 南京红姐事件; traditional Chinese: 南京紅姐事件; pinyin: Nánjīng Hóng Jiě shìjiàn) is a scandal that emerged in July 2025 involving a 38-year-old man surnamed Jiao (Chinese: 焦; pinyin: Jiāo) from Nanjing, China, who allegedly posed as a woman, "Sister Hong" (Chinese: 红姐; pinyin: Hóng Jiě; lit. 'Sister Red'), and has engaged in sexual acts with several men. The encounters were reportedly recorded, and the videos subsequently circulated online. The investigation is ongoing and has sparked widespread media coverage and public debate in Chinese-speaking regions and internationally and has generated many Internet memes and derivative content.‍

== Incident ==
According to media reports, the individual at the center of the scandal, a 38-year-old man surnamed Jiao, adopted the online persona of "Sister Hong". Presenting as a woman, he is alleged to have arranged and participated in sexual encounters with numerous male partners. These encounters were systematically recorded.‍ Reports on the social media platform RedNote indicate that Jiao's method involved presenting as a married woman on dating apps, thereby attracting men who were specifically enticed by the fantasy of intimate relations with another person's spouse.‍‍

The incident came to broader public attention when these explicit videos began to be shared and sold on various online platforms. The scale of the videos and the number of men involved quickly made "Sister Hong" a viral topic on Chinese social media. While initial online rumors claimed that over 1,600 men had been involved, police dismissed that number as an exaggeration.‍ He operated by offering "free sexual services" to lure men, forgoing cash payments in lieu of gifts such as peanut oil, fruit, milk, or a small appliance. The victims included college students, young professionals, gym attendants, and foreign nationals. To profit from the video footage, he created an online group where he shared the clips, charging a 150 yuan (US$20) membership fee.‍

Some individuals reportedly returned on multiple occasions to engage in sexual activity with Jiao.‍ Media reports described certain visitors as well-dressed and physically attractive, using terms such as "little fresh meat" (a colloquial phrase for youthful, good-looking men) and "high-quality straight men".‍

== Investigation and arrest ==
In early July 2025, police in Nanjing launched an investigation into the matter. This led to the arrest of a man behind the "Sister Hong" persona on July 6. He is facing charges related to the production and distribution of obscene material. Authorities have been working to remove the illicit videos from the Internet and have urged the public to cease their dissemination.‍

While initial online rumours claimed that over 1,600 men had been involved, police dismissed that number as an exaggeration. Authorities have not released a definitive number of men involved, nor have they specified how much Jiao profited from the videos.‍

The Legal Daily confirmed that at least three of the victims who reported the case tested positive for HIV, but it could not be confirmed whether it was related to Jiao. The local disease control center stated that it has intervened and is investigating. Victims who had close contact with Jiao and are concerned about their health can go for testing at any time.

== Reaction ==
The hashtag "红姐" (pinyin: Hóng Jiě; lit. 'Sister Hong') dominated China's popular social media site Weibo on July 8, hitting the number‐one trending spot with more than 200 million views.‍

Following the release of the videos, some of the men were identified by personal acquaintances, while their social media profiles were independently discovered by online observers. One woman reportedly recognized her spouse among the headshots and filed for divorce.‍

In response, the Nanjing Municipal Centre for Disease Control and Prevention (CDC) offered health screenings for anyone suspecting exposure to sexually transmitted infections (STIs). Citing medical privacy laws, the agency has not confirmed Jiao's own infection status.‍

The incident quickly evolved into an Internet sensation. It inspired a vast array of derivative content, including Internet memes, AI-generated parodies, and fashion tutorials on how to replicate the "Sister Hong" style. The online phenomenon saw users employing artificial intelligence to insert "Sister Hong"'s likeness into mock advertisements, toy packaging, and parody posters for television dramas. Commercial retailers capitalized on the incident with advertisements. Some campaigns promoted guides on how to "attract high-quality men" using "essential items" modeled after Jiao's appearance—such as blunt-cut wigs, solid-colored face masks, floral blouses, and black maxi skirts.‍‍

An augmented reality filter called the "Sister Hong Filter Challenge" appeared on Instagram. It places the user in a realistic recreation of Jiao's bedroom, using the bed and walls from the videos as a backdrop and labeling the scene with the Thai text for "Mystery Room".‍

A Vietnamese stage play featured a character based on Sister Hong. The actor gave only a brief greeting before promptly exiting the stage, but their appearance drew cheers from the audience.‍

The Brazilian version of the learning platform Duolingo posted on X, showing its mascot, Duo, carrying a bag of fruit and entering the home of Jiao. The caption read, "Guys, I've come to a super strange place to teach Chinese. I can't quite explain what's going on."
