= Hmong language =

West Hmongic dialect continuum

Hmong
- Mong
- lus Hmoob / lug Moob / lol Hmongb / lus Hmôngz (Vietnam) / 𖬇𖬰𖬞 𖬌𖬣𖬵 / 𞄉𞄧𞄵𞄀𞄩𞄰
- Pronunciation: [m̥ɔ̃́]
- Native to: China, Vietnam, Laos, Myanmar and Thailand
- Ethnicity: Hmong
- Native speakers: 4.5 million^{[a]} (2015)
- Language family: Hmong–Mien: Hmongic; Core Hmongic; West Hmongic; Chuanqiandian cluster; Hmong
- Writing system: Hmong writing: incl. Pahawh Hmong, Nyiakeng Puachue Hmong, multiple Latin standards

Official status
- Recognised minority language in: China; Laos; Myanmar; Vietnam; Thailand

Language codes
- ISO 639-2: hmn Hmong, Mong (China, Laos)
- ISO 639-3: hmn – inclusive code for the Hmong/Mong macrolanguage (China, Laos), including all Core Hmongic languages, except hmf and hmv Individual codes: cqd – Chuanqiandian Cluster Miao (cover term for Hmong in China) hea – Northern Qiandong Miao hma – Southern Mashan Hmong hmc – Central Huishui Hmong hmd – Large Flowery Miao hme – Eastern Huishui Hmong hmf – Hmong Don (Vietnam) hmg – Southwestern Guiyang Hmong hmh – Southwestern Huishui Hmong hmi – Northern Huishui Hmong hmj – Ge hml – Luopohe Hmong hmm – Central Mashan Hmong hmp – Northern Mashan Hmong hmq – Eastern Qiandong Miao hms – Southern Qiandong Miao hmv – Hmong Dô (Vietnam) hmw – Western Mashan Hmong hmy – Southern Guiyang Hmong hmz – Hmong Shua (Sinicized Miao) hnj – Mong Njua/Mong Leng (China, Laos), Blue/Green Hmong (United States) hrm – A-Hmo, Horned Miao (China) huj – Northern Guiyang Hmong mmr – Western Xiangxi Miao muq – Eastern Xiangxi Miao mww – Hmong Daw (China, Laos), White Hmong (United States) sfm – Small Flowery Miao
- Glottolog: firs1234
- Linguasphere: 48-AAA-a
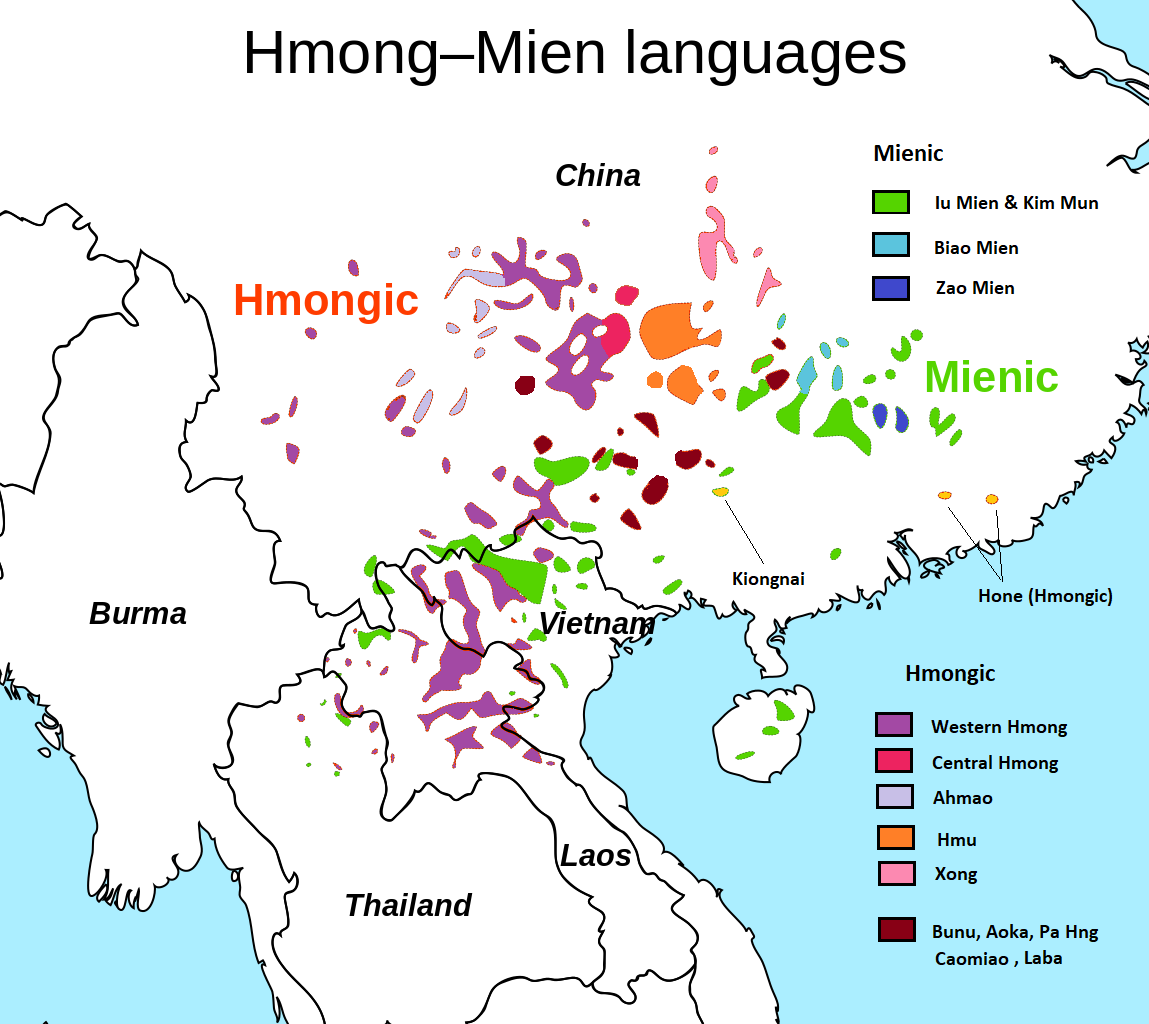
- Map of Hmong-Mien languages, West Hmongic language in purple

Hmong or Mong (/ˈmʌŋ/ MUNG; RPA: Hmoob, Chữ Hmông Việt: Hmôngz, Nyiakeng Puachue: 𞄀𞄩𞄰, Pahawh: 𖬌𖬣𖬵, [m̥ɔ̃́]) is a dialect continuum of the West Hmongic branch of the Hmongic languages spoken by the Hmong people of Southwestern China, northern Vietnam, Thailand, and Laos. There are an estimated 4.5 million speakers of varieties that are largely mutually intelligible, including over 280,000 Hmong Americans as of 2013. Over half of all Hmong speakers speak the various dialects in China, where the Dananshan dialect forms the basis of the standard language. However, Hmong Daw and Mong Leng are widely known only in Laos and the United States; Dananshan is more widely known in the native region of Hmong.

== Varieties ==
Mong Leng (Moob Leeg) and Hmong Daw (Hmoob Dawb) are part of a dialect cluster known in China as Chuanqiandian Miao (Chinese: 川黔滇苗; lit. 'Sichuan–Guizhou–Yunnan Miao'), called the "Chuanqiandian cluster" in English (or "Miao cluster" in other languages) since West Hmongic is also called Chuanqiandian Miao. The variety spoken from Sichuan in China to Thailand and Laos is referred to in China as the "First Local Variety" (第一土语) of the cluster. Mong Leng and Hmong Daw are just those varieties of the cluster that migrated to Laos. The names Mong Leng, Hmong Dleu/Der, and Hmong Daw are also used in China for various dialects of the cluster.

Ethnologue once distinguished only the Laotian varieties (Hmong Daw, Mong Leng), Sinicized Miao (Hmong Shua), and the Vietnamese varieties (Hmong Dô, Hmong Don). The Vietnamese varieties are very poorly known; population estimates are not even available. In 2007, Horned Miao, Small Flowery Miao, and the Chuanqiandian cluster of China were split off from Mong Leng [blu].

These varieties are as follows, along with some alternative names.

- Hmong/Mong/Chuanqiandian Miao macrolanguage (China, Laos, also spoken by minorities in Thailand and the United States), including:
  - Hmong Daw (Hmong Der, Hmoob Dawb, Hmong Dleu, Hmongb Dleub, 'White Hmong'; Chinese: 白苗, Bái Miáo, 'White Miao'),
  - Mong Leng (Moob Leeg, Moob Ntsuab, Mongb Nzhuab, 'Blue/Green Hmong'; Chinese: 青苗, Qīng Miáo, 'Blue-Green Miao'),
  - Hmong Shua (Hmongb Shuat; 'Sinicized Miao'),
  - Hmo or A-Hmo (Chinese: 角苗, Jiǎo Miáo, 'Horned Miao'),
  - Small Flowery Miao,
  - and the rest of the Chuanqiandian Miao cluster located in China.
- Hmong languages of Vietnam, not considered part of the China/Laos macrolanguage and possibly forming their own distinct macrolanguage — they are still not very well classified even if they are described by Ethnologue as having vigorous use (in Vietnam) but without population estimates; they have most probably been influenced by Vietnamese, as well as by French (in the former Indochina colonies) and later American English, and they may be confused with varieties spoken by minorities living today in the United States, Europe or elsewhere in Asia (where their varieties may have been assimilated locally, but separately in each area, with other Hmong varieties imported from Laos and China):
  - Hmong Dô (Vietnam),
  - Hmong Don (Vietnam, assumed).

The Centers for Disease Control and Prevention (CDC) stated that the White and Leng dialects "are said to be mutually intelligible to a well-trained ear, with pronunciation and vocabulary differences analogous to the differences between British and American English."

Several Chinese varieties may overlap with or be more distinct than the varieties listed above:

- Dananshan Miao (Hmong Drout Raol, Hmong Hout Lab; called Hmong Dou in Northern Hmong), the basis of the Chinese standard of the Chuanqiandian cluster
- Black Miao (subgroups: Hmong Dlob, Hmong Buak/Hmoob Puas; Chinese: 黑苗, Hēi Miáo)
- Southern Hmong (subgroups: Hmongb Shib, Hmongb Lens, Hmongb Dlex Nchab, Hmongb Sad; includes Mong Leng)
- Northern Hmong (subgroups: Hmongb Soud, Hmong Be/Hmongb Bes, Hmongb Ndrous)
- Western Sichuan Miao (Chinese: 川苗, Chuān Miáo)

In the 2007 request to establish an ISO code for the Chuanqiandian cluster, corresponding to the "first local dialect" (第一土语) of the Chuanqiandian cluster in Chinese, the proposer made the following statement on mutual intelligibility:

A colleague has talked with speakers of a number of these closely-related lects in the US, in Thailand and in China, and has had many discussions with Chinese linguists and foreign researchers or community development workers who have had extensive contact with speakers of these lects. As a result of these conversations this colleague believes that many of these lects are likely to have high inherent mutual intelligibility within the cluster. Culturally, while each sub-group prides itself on its own distinctives, they also recognize that other sub-groups within this category are culturally similar to themselves and accept the others as members of the same general ethnic group. However, this category of lects is internally varied and geographically scattered and mixed over a broad land area, and comprehensive intelligibility testing would be required to confirm reports of mutual intelligibility throughout the cluster.

=== Varieties in Laos ===
According to the CDC, "although there is no official preference for one dialect over the other, White Hmong seems to be favored in many ways": the Romanized Popular Alphabet (RPA) most closely reflects that of White Hmong (Hmong Daw); most educated Hmong speak White Hmong because White Hmong people lack the ability to understand Mong Leng; and most Hmong dictionaries only include the White Hmong dialect. Furthermore, younger generations of Hmong are more likely to speak White Hmong, and speakers of Mong Leng are more likely to understand White Hmong than speakers of White Hmong are to understand Mong Leng.

=== Varieties in the United States ===
Most Hmong in the United States speak White Hmong (Hmoob Dawb) and Mong Leng (Moob Leeg), with around 60% speaking White Hmong and 40% Mong Leng. The CDC states that "though some Hmong report difficulty understanding speakers of a dialect not their own, for the most part, Mong Leng seem to do better when understanding both dialects."

== Phonology ==
The three dialects described here are Hmong Daw (also called White Miao or Hmong Der), Mong Leeg (also called Blue/Green Miao or Mong Leng), and Dananshan (Standard Chinese Miao). Hmong Daw and Mong Leeg are the two major dialects spoken by Hmong Americans. Although mutually intelligible, the dialects differ in both lexicon and certain aspects of phonology. For instance, Mong Leeg lacks the voiceless/aspirated /m̥/ of Hmong Daw (as exemplified by their names) and has a third nasalized vowel, /ã/; Dananshan has a couple of extra diphthongs in native words, numerous Chinese loans, and an eighth tone.

=== Vowels ===
The vowel systems of Hmong Daw and Mong Leeg are as shown in the following charts. (Phonemes particular to Hmong Daw† and Mong Leeg‡ are color-coded and indicated by a dagger or double dagger respectively.)

1. 1st Row: IPA, Hmong RPA
2. 2nd Row: Nyiakeng Puachue
3. 3rd Row: Pahawh

Monophthongs
	Front		Central		Back	
	oral	nasal	oral	nasal	oral	nasal
Close	i ⟨i⟩ 𖬂, 𖬃		ɨ ⟨w⟩ 𖬘, 𖬙		u ⟨u⟩ 𖬆, 𖬇	
Mid	e ⟨e⟩ 𖬈, 𖬉	ẽ~eŋ ⟨ee⟩ 𖬀, 𖬁			ɔ ⟨o⟩ 𖬒, 𖬓	ɔ̃~ɔŋ ⟨oo⟩ 𖬌, 𖬍
Open			a ⟨a⟩ 𖬖, 𖬗	ã~aŋ ⟨aa⟩ 𖬚, 𖬛‡		

Diphthongs
	Closing	Centering
Close component is front	ai ⟨ai⟩ 𞄤𞄦, 𞄣 𖬊, 𖬋	iə ⟨ia⟩ 𞄦𞄤, 𞄞 𖬔, 𖬕†
Close component is central	aɨ ⟨aw⟩ 𞄤𞄬, 𞄢 𖬎, 𖬏	
Close component is back	au ⟨au⟩ 𞄤𞄨, 𞄠 𖬄, 𖬅	uə ⟨ua⟩ 𞄧𞄤, 𞄜 𖬐, 𖬑

The Dananshan standard of China is similar. Phonemic differences from Hmong Daw and Mong Leeg are color-coded and marked as absent or added.

Dananshan Miao vowels
	Front		Central		Back	
	oral	nasal	oral	nasal	oral	nasal
Close	i		(ɨ) (added)		u	
Mid	e	en			o	oŋ
Open			a	aŋ		

Diphthongs
	Closing	Centering
Close component is front	aj ⟨ai⟩	(absent)
Close component is back	aw ⟨au⟩	wɒ ⟨ua⟩
Close component is back	əw ⟨ou⟩ eβ ⟨eu⟩ (added)	

Dananshan [ɨ] occurs only after non-palatal affricates, and is written ⟨i⟩, much like Mandarin Chinese. /u/ is pronounced [y] after palatal consonants. There is also a triphthong /jeβ/ ⟨ieu⟩, as well as other i- and u-initial sequences in Chinese borrowings, such as /waj/.

=== Consonants ===
Hmong makes a number of phonemic contrasts unfamiliar to English speakers. All non-glottal stops and affricates distinguish aspirated and unaspirated forms, and most also distinguish prenasalization independently of this. The consonant inventory of Hmong is shown in the chart below. (Consonants particular to Hmong Daw† and Mong Leeg‡ are color-coded and indicated by a dagger or double dagger respectively.)

1. 1st Row: IPA, Hmong RPA
2. 2nd Row: Nyiakeng Puachue
3. 3rd Row: Pahawh

Hmong Daw and Mong Leeg consonants
		Labial		Alveolar			Retroflex		Palatal	Velar	Uvular	Glottal
		plain	lateral^{*}	plain	sibilant	lateral^{*}	plain	sibilant	Palatal	Velar	Uvular	Glottal
Nasal	voiceless	m̥ ⟨hm⟩ 𞄀𞄄 𖬣𖬵†	(m̥ˡ) ⟨hml⟩ 𞄠𞄄 𖬠𖬰†	n̥ ⟨hn⟩ 𞄅𞄄 𖬩†					ɲ̥ ⟨hny⟩ 𞄐𞄄 𖬣𖬰†			
Nasal	voiced	m ⟨m⟩ 𞄀 𖬦	(mˡ) ⟨ml⟩ 𞄠 𖬠	n ⟨n⟩ 𞄅 𖬬					ɲ ⟨ny⟩ 𞄐 𖬮𖬵	(ŋ ⟨g⟩ marginal)	⟨ɴ⟩ 𞄢	
Plosive/ Affricate	tenuis	p ⟨p⟩ 𞄚 𖬪𖬵	(pˡ) ⟨pl⟩ 𞄡 𖬟𖬵	t ⟨t⟩ 𞄃 𖬧𖬵	ts ⟨tx⟩ 𞄔 𖬯𖬵	(tˡ) ⟨dl⟩ 𞄏 𖬞𖬰‡	ʈ ⟨r⟩ 𞄖 𖬡	tʂ ⟨ts⟩ 𞄁 𖬝𖬰	c ⟨c⟩ 𞄈 𖬯	k ⟨k⟩^{***} 𞄎	q ⟨q⟩ 𞄗 𖬦𖬵	ʔ ⟨au⟩ 𞄠 𖬮𖬰
Plosive/ Affricate	aspirated	pʰ ⟨ph⟩ 𞄚𞄄 𖬝𖬵	(pˡʰ) ⟨plh⟩ 𞄡𞄄 𖬪	tʰ ⟨th⟩ 𞄃𞄄 𖬟𖬰	tsʰ ⟨txh⟩ 𞄔𞄄 𖬦𖬰	(tˡʰ) ⟨dlh⟩ 𞄏𞄄 𖬞𖬵‡	ʈʰ ⟨rh⟩ 𞄖𞄄 𖬢𖬵	tʂʰ ⟨tsh⟩ 𞄁𞄄 𖬪𖬰	cʰ ⟨ch⟩ 𞄈𞄄 𖬧	kʰ ⟨kh⟩ 𞄎𞄄 𖬩𖬰	qʰ ⟨qh⟩ 𞄗𞄄 𖬣	
Plosive/ Affricate	voiced			d ⟨d⟩ 𞄏 𖬞𖬰†								
Plosive/ Affricate	murmured			dʱ ⟨dh⟩ 𞄏𞄄 𖬞𖬵†								
Plosive/ Affricate	prenasalized^{**}	ᵐb ⟨np⟩ 𞄜 𖬨𖬵	(ᵐbˡ) ⟨npl⟩ 𞄞 𖬫𖬰	ⁿd ⟨nt⟩ 𞄂 𖬩𖬵	ⁿdz ⟨ntx⟩ 𞄓 𖬢𖬰	(ⁿdˡ) ⟨ndl⟩ 𞄝 𖬭𖬰‡	ᶯɖ ⟨nr⟩ 𞄑 𖬜𖬰	ᶯdʐ ⟨nts⟩ 𞄍 𖬝	ᶮɟ ⟨nc⟩ 𞄌 𖬤𖬰	ᵑɡ ⟨nk⟩ 𞄇 𖬢	ᶰɢ ⟨nq⟩ 𞄙 𖬬𖬰	
Plosive/ Affricate	prenasalized^{**}	ᵐpʰ ⟨nph⟩ 𞄜𞄄 𖬡𖬰	(ᵐpˡʰ) ⟨nplh⟩ 𞄞𞄄 𖬡𖬵	ⁿtʰ ⟨nth⟩ 𞄂𞄄 𖬫	ⁿtsʰ ⟨ntxh⟩ 𞄓𞄄 𖬥𖬵	(ⁿtˡʰ) ⟨ndlh⟩ 𞄝𞄄 𖬭𖬵‡	ᶯʈʰ ⟨nrh⟩ 𞄑𞄄 𖬨𖬰	ᶯtʂʰ ⟨ntsh⟩ 𞄍𞄄 𖬯𖬰	ᶮcʰ ⟨nch⟩ 𞄌𞄄 𖬨	ᵑkʰ ⟨nkh⟩ 𞄇𞄄 𖬫𖬵	ᶰqʰ ⟨nqh⟩ 𞄙𞄄 𖬬𖬵	
Continuant	voiceless	f ⟨f⟩ 𞄕 𖬜𖬵		s ⟨x⟩ 𞄆 𖬮		l̥ ⟨hl⟩ 𞄄𞄉 𖬥	ʂ ⟨s⟩ 𞄊 𖬤𖬵		ɕ ~ ç ⟨xy⟩ 𞄛 𖬧𖬰			h ⟨h⟩ 𞄄 𖬟
Continuant	voiced	v ⟨v⟩ 𞄒 𖬜				l ⟨l⟩ 𞄉 𖬞	ʐ ⟨z⟩ 𞄋 𖬥𖬰		ʑ ~ ʝ ⟨y⟩ 𞄘 𖬤			
Approximant							⟨ɻ⟩ 𞄣					

The Dananshan standard of China is similar. (Phonemic differences from Hmong Daw and Mong Leeg are color-coded and marked as absent or added. Minor differences, such as the voicing of prenasalized stops, or whether /c/ is an affricate or /h/ is velar, may be a matter of transcription.) Aspirates, voiceless fricatives, voiceless nasals, and glottal stop only occur with yin tones (1, 3, 5, 7). Standard orthography is added in angled brackets. The glottal stop is not written; it is not distinct from a zero initial. There is also a /w/, which occurs only in foreign words.

Dananshan Miao consonants
		Labial		Alveolar			Retroflex		Palatal	Velar	Uvular	Glottal
		plain	lateral^{*}	plain	sibilant	lateral^{*}	plain	sibilant	Palatal	Velar	Uvular	Glottal
Nasal	voiceless	m̥ ⟨hm⟩	(absent)	n̥ ⟨hn⟩					ɲ̥ ⟨hni⟩			
Nasal	voiced	m ⟨m⟩	(absent)	n ⟨n⟩					ɲ ⟨ni⟩	ŋ ⟨ngg⟩ (added)		
Plosive/ Affricate	tenuis	p ⟨b⟩	(pˡ) ⟨bl⟩	t ⟨d⟩	ts ⟨z⟩	(tˡ) ⟨dl⟩	ʈ ⟨dr⟩	tʂ ⟨zh⟩	tɕ ⟨j⟩	k ⟨g⟩	q ⟨gh⟩	(ʔ)
Plosive/ Affricate	aspirated	pʰ ⟨p⟩	(pˡʰ) ⟨pl⟩	tʰ ⟨t⟩	tsʰ ⟨c⟩	(tˡʰ) ⟨tl⟩	ʈʰ ⟨tr⟩	tʂʰ ⟨ch⟩	tɕʰ ⟨q⟩	kʰ ⟨k⟩	qʰ ⟨kh⟩	
Plosive/ Affricate	voiced			(absent)								
Plosive/ Affricate	prenasalized^{**}	ᵐp ⟨nb⟩	(ᵐpˡ) ⟨nbl⟩	ⁿt ⟨nd⟩	ⁿts ⟨nz⟩	(absent)	ᶯʈ ⟨ndr⟩	ᶯtʂ ⟨nzh⟩	ⁿtɕ ⟨nj⟩	ᵑk ⟨ng⟩	ᶰq ⟨ngh⟩	
Plosive/ Affricate	prenasalized^{**}	ᵐpʰ ⟨np⟩	(ᵐpˡʰ) ⟨npl⟩	ⁿtʰ ⟨nt⟩	ⁿtsʰ ⟨nc⟩	(absent)	ᶯʈʰ ⟨ntr⟩	ᶯtʂʰ ⟨nch⟩	ⁿtɕʰ ⟨nq⟩	ᵑkʰ ⟨nk⟩	ᶰqʰ ⟨nkh⟩	
Continuant	voiceless	f ⟨f⟩		s ⟨s⟩		l̥ ⟨hl⟩	ʂ ⟨sh⟩		ɕ ⟨x⟩	x ⟨h⟩		
Continuant	voiced	v ⟨v⟩				l ⟨l⟩	ʐ ⟨r⟩		ʑ ~ ʝ ⟨y⟩	(w)		

^* The status of the consonants described here as single phonemes with lateral release is controversial. A number of scholars instead analyze them as biphonemic clusters with /l/ as the second element. The difference in analysis (e.g., between /pˡ/ and /pl/) is not based on any disagreement in the sound or pronunciation of the consonants in question, but on differing theoretical grounds. Those in favor of a unit-phoneme analysis generally argue for this based on distributional evidence (i.e., if clusters, these would be the only clusters in the language, although see below) and dialect evidence (the laterally released dentals in Mong Leeg, e.g. /tˡʰ/, correspond to the voiced dentals of White Hmong), whereas those in favor of a cluster analysis tend to argue on the basis of general phonetic principles (other examples of labial phonemes with lateral release appear extremely rare or nonexistent).

^** Some linguists prefer to analyze the prenasalized consonants as clusters whose first element is /n/. However, this cluster analysis is not as common as the above one involving /l/.

^*** Only used in Hmong RPA and not in Pahawh Hmong, since Hmong RPA uses Latin script and Pahawh Hmong does not. For example, in Hmong RPA, to write keeb, the order Consonant + Vowel + Tone (CVT) must be followed, so it is k + ee + b = keeb, but in Pahawh Hmong, it is just Keeb "𖬀" (3rd-Stage Version).

=== Syllable structure ===
Hmong syllables have simple structure: all syllables have an onset consonant (except in a few particles), nuclei may consist of a monophthong or diphthong, and the only coda consonants that occur are nasals. In Hmong Daw and Mong Leeg, nasal codas have become nasalized vowels, though they may be accompanied by weakly articulated [ŋ]. Similarly, a short [ʔ] may accompany the low-falling creaky tone.

Dananshan has a syllabic /l̩/ (written ⟨l⟩) in Chinese loans, such as lf 'two' and lx 'child'.

=== Tones ===
Hmong is a tonal language and makes use of seven (Hmong Daw and Mong Leeg) or eight (Dananshan) distinct tones.

Tone	Hmong Daw example	Hmong/Mong RPA spelling	Vietnamese Hmong spelling	Nyiakeng Puachue	Pahawh Hmong
High ˥	/pɔ́/ 'ball'	pob	poz	𞄚𞄨𞄰	𖬒𖬪𖬵
Mid ˧	/pɔ/ 'spleen'	po	po	𞄚𞄨	𖬓𖬰𖬪𖬵
Low ˩	/pɔ̀/ 'thorn'	pos	pos	𞄚𞄨𞄴	𖬓𖬲𖬪𖬵
High-falling ˥˧	/pɔ̂/ 'female'	poj	pox	𞄚𞄨𞄲	𖬒𖬲𖬪𖬵
Mid-rising ˧˦	/pɔ̌/ 'to throw'	pov	por	𞄚𞄨𞄳	𖬓𖬪𖬵
Low checked (creaky) tone ˩ (phrase final: long low rising ˨˩˧)	/pɔ̰̀/ 'to see'	pom	pov	𞄚𞄨𞄱	𖬒𖬰𖬪𖬵
Mid-falling breathy tone ˧˩	/pɔ̤̂/ 'grandmother'	pog	pol	𞄚𞄨𞄵	𖬓𖬶𖬪𖬵

The Dananshan tones are transcribed as pure tone. However, given how similar several of them are, it is likely that there are also phonational differences as in Hmong Daw and Mong Leeg. Tones 4 and 6, for example, are said to make tenuis plosives breathy voiced (浊送气), suggesting they may be breathy/murmured like the Hmong g-tone. Tones 7 and 8 are used in early Chinese loans with entering tone, suggesting they may once have marked checked syllables.

Because voiceless consonants apart from tenuis plosives are restricted to appearing before certain tones (1, 3, 5, 7), those are placed first in the table:

Dananshan Miao tone
Tone	IPA	Orthography
1 high falling	˦˧ 43	b
3 top	˥ 5	d
5 high	˦ 4	t
7 mid	˧ 3	k
2 mid falling	˧˩ 31	x
4 low falling (breathy)	˨˩̤ 21	l
6 low rising (breathy)	˩˧̤ 13	s
8 mid rising	˨˦ 24	f

So much information is conveyed by the tones that it is possible to speak intelligibly using musical tunes only; there is a tradition of young lovers communicating covertly playing a Jew's harp to convey vowel sounds.

== Orthography ==
Robert Cooper, an anthropologist, collected a Hmong folktale saying that the Hmong used to have a written language, and important information was written down in a treasured book. The folktale explains that cows and rats ate the book, so, in the words of Anne Fadiman, author of The Spirit Catches You and You Fall Down, "no text was equal to the task of representing a culture as rich as that of the Hmong." Therefore, the folktale states that the Hmong language was exclusively oral from that point onwards.

Natalie Jill Smith, author of "Ethnicity, Reciprocity, Reputation and Punishment: An Ethnoexperimental Study of Cooperation among the Chaldeans and Hmong of Detroit (Michigan)", wrote that the Qing Dynasty had caused a previous Hmong writing system to die out when it stated that the death penalty would be imposed on those who wrote it down.

Since the end of the 19th century, linguists created over two dozen Hmong writing systems, including systems using Chinese characters, the Lao alphabet, the Cyrillic script, the Thai alphabet, and the Vietnamese alphabet. In addition, in 1959 Shong Lue Yang, a Hmong spiritual leader from Laos, created an 81 symbol writing system called Pahawh. Yang was not previously literate in any language. Chao Fa, an anti-Laotian government Hmong group, uses this writing system.

In the 1980s, Nyiakeng Puachue Hmong script was created by a Hmong Minister, Reverend Chervang Kong Vang, to be able to capture Hmong vocabulary clearly and also to remedy redundancies in the language as well as address semantic confusions that was lacking in other scripts. Nyiakeng Puachue Hmong script was mainly used by United Christians Liberty Evangelical Church, a church also founded by Vang, although the script have been found to be in use in Laos, Thailand, Vietnam, France, and Australia. The script bears strong resemblance to the Lao alphabet in structure and form and characters inspired from the Hebrew alphabets, although the characters themselves are different.

Other experiments by Hmong and non-Hmong orthographers have been undertaken using invented letters.

The Romanized Popular Alphabet (RPA), the most widely used script for Hmong Daw and Mong Leeg, was developed in Laos between 1951 and 1953 by three Western missionaries. In the United States Hmong do not use RPA for spelling of proper nouns, because they want their names to be easily pronounced by people unfamiliar with RPA. For instance Hmong in the U.S. spell Hmoob as "Hmong," and Liab Lis is spelled as Lia Lee.

The Dananshan standard in China is written in a pinyin-based alphabet, with tone letters similar to those used in RPA.

=== Correspondence between orthographies ===
The following is a list of pairs of RPA and Dananshan segments having the same sound (or very similar sounds). Note however that RPA and the standard in China not only differ in orthographic rules, but are also used to write different languages. The list is ordered alphabetically by the RPA, apart from prenasalized stops and voiceless sonorants, which come after their oral and voiced homologues. There are three overriding patterns to the correspondences: RPA doubles a vowel for nasalization, whereas pinyin uses ⟨ng⟩; RPA uses ⟨h⟩ for aspiration, whereas pinyin uses the voicing distinction of the Latin script; pinyin uses ⟨h⟩ (and ⟨r⟩) to derive the retroflex and uvular series from the dental and velar, whereas RPA uses sequences based on ⟨t, x, k⟩ vs. ⟨r, s, q⟩ for the same.

==== Vowels ====
RPA	Pinyin	Vietnamese	Pahawh
a			𖬖, 𖬗
aa	ang		𖬚, 𖬛
ai			𖬊, 𖬋
au		âu	𖬄, 𖬅
aw	–	ơư	𖬎, 𖬏
e		ê	𖬈, 𖬉
ee	eng	ênh	𖬀, 𖬁
–	eu	–	–
i			𖬂, 𖬃
ia	–	iê	𖬔, 𖬕
o			𖬒, 𖬓
oo	ong	ông	𖬌, 𖬍
–	ou	–	–
u		u	𖬆, 𖬇
ua		uô	𖬐, 𖬑
w	i	ư	𖬘, 𖬙

==== Consonants ====
RPA	Dananshan	Vietnamese	Pahawh
c	j	ch	𖬯
ch	q		𖬧
nc	nj	nd	𖬤𖬰
nch	nq		𖬨
d	–	đ	𖬞𖬰
dh	–	đh	𖬞𖬵
dl		đr	𖬞𖬰 (Green only)
dlh	tl	đl	𖬞𖬵 (Green only)
ndl	–	nđr	𖬭𖬰
ndlh	–	nđl	𖬭𖬵
f		ph	𖬜𖬵
h			𖬟
k	g	c	–
kh	k	kh	𖬩𖬰
nk	ng	g	𖬢
nkh	nk	nkh	𖬫𖬵
l			𖬞
hl			𖬥
m			𖬦
hm			𖬣𖬵
ml	–	mn	𖬠
hml	–	hmn	𖬠𖬰
n			𖬬
hn		hn	𖬩
–	ngg	–	–
ny	ni	nh	𖬮𖬵
hny	hni	hnh	𖬣𖬰
p	b	p	𖬪𖬵
ph	p	ph	𖬝𖬵
np	nb	b	𖬨𖬵
nph	np	mf	𖬡𖬰
pl	bl	pl	𖬟𖬵
plh	pl	fl	𖬪
npl	nbl	bl	𖬫𖬰
nplh	npl	mfl	𖬡𖬵
q	gh	k	𖬦𖬵
qh	kh	qh	𖬣
nq	ngh	ng	𖬬𖬰
nqh	nkh	nkr	𖬬𖬵
r	dr	tr	𖬡
rh	tr	rh	𖬢𖬵
nr	ndr	r	𖬜𖬰
nrh	ntr	nr	𖬨𖬰
s	sh	s	𖬤𖬵
t	d	t	𖬧𖬵
th	t	th	𖬟𖬰
nt	nd	nt	𖬩𖬵
nth	nt	nth	𖬫
ts	zh	ts	𖬝𖬰
tsh	ch	tsh	𖬪𖬰
nts	nzh	nts	𖬝
ntsh	nch	ntsh	𖬯𖬰
tx	z	tx	𖬯𖬵
txh	c	cx	𖬦𖬰
ntx	nz	nz	𖬢𖬰
ntxh	nc	nx	𖬥𖬵
v			𖬜
–	w	–	–
x	s	x	𖬮
xy	x	sh	𖬧𖬰
y		z	𖬤
z	r	j	𖬥𖬰

There is no simple correspondence between the tone letters. The historical connection between the tones is as follows. The Chinese names reflect the tones given to early Chinese loan words with those tones in Chinese.

Tone class	Tone number	Dananshan orthog.	RPA		Vietnamese Hmong
Tone class	Tone number	Dananshan orthog.	White	Green	Vietnamese Hmong
平 or A	1	b ˦˧	b ˥		z
平 or A	2	x ˧˩	j ˥˧		x
上 or B	3	d ˥	v ˧˦		r
上 or B	4	l ˨˩̤	s	g	s
去 or C	5	t ˦	(unmarked) ˧		
去 or C	6	s ˩˧̤	g ˧˩̤		l
入 or D	7	k ˧	s ˩		s
入 or D	8	f ˨˦	m ˩̰ ~ d ˨˩˧		v ~ k

Tones 4 and 7 merged in Hmoob Dawb, whereas tones 4 and 6 merged in Mong Leeg.

Example: lus Hmoob /̤ lṳ˧˩ m̥õ˦ / 𞄉𞄧𞄴𞄀𞄄𞄰𞄩 / (White Hmong) / lug Moob / 𞄉𞄧𞄵𞄀𞄩𞄰 / (Mong Leng) / lol Hmongb (Dananshan) / lus Hmôngz (Vietnamese) "Hmong language".

== Grammar ==
Hmong is an analytic SVO language in which adjectives and demonstratives follow the noun.

=== Nouns ===
Noun phrases can contain the following elements (parentheses indicate optional elements):

(possessive) + (quantifier) + (classifier) + noun + (adjective) + (demonstrative)

The Hmong pronominal system distinguishes between three grammatical persons and three numbers – singular, dual, and plural. They are not marked for case, that is, the same word is used to translate both "I" and "me", "she" and "her", and so forth. These are the personal pronouns of Hmong Daw and Mong Leeg:

1. 1st Row: IPA, Hmong RPA
2. 2nd Row: Vietnamese Hmong
3. 3rd Row: Pahawh Hmong
4. 4th Row: Nyiakeng Puachue

White Hmong Pronouns
Number:	Singular	Dual	Plural
First	kuv cur 𖬆𖬲 𞄎𞄧𞄳	wb ưz 𖬘𖬰𖬮𖬰 𞄬𞄰	peb pêz 𖬈𖬰𖬪𖬵 𞄚𞄪𞄰
Second	koj cox 𖬒𖬲 𞄎𞄨𞄲	neb nêz 𖬈𖬰𖬬 𞄅𞄪𞄰	nej nêx 𖬈𖬲𖬬 𞄅𞄪𞄲
Third	nws nưs 𖬙𖬲𖬬 𞄅𞄬𞄴	nkawd gơưk 𖬎𖬱𖬢 𞄇𞄤𞄶𞄬	lawv lơưr 𖬎𖬶𖬞 𞄉𞄤𞄳𞄬

Green Hmong Pronouns
Number:	Singular	Dual	Plural
First	kuv cur 𖬆𖬲 𞄎𞄧𞄳	ib iz 𖬂𖬲𖬮𖬰 𞄦𞄰	peb pêz 𖬈𖬰𖬪𖬵 𞄚𞄪𞄰
Second	koj cox 𖬒𖬲 𞄎𞄨𞄲	meb mêz 𖬈𖬰𖬦 𞄀𞄪𞄰	mej mêx 𖬈𖬲𖬦 𞄀𞄪𞄲
Third	nwg nưs 𖬙𖬶𖬬 𞄅𞄬𞄵	ob tug oz tus 𖬒𖬰𖬮𖬰 𖬇𖬲𖬧𖬵 𞄨𞄰𞄃𞄧𞄵	puab puôz 𖬐𖬶𖬪𖬵 𞄚𞄧𞄰𞄤

==== Classifiers ====
Classifiers are one of the features recurrently found in languages of Southeast Asia. In Hmong, the noun does not directly follow a numeral, and a classifier or an adjective is required to count objects. Here are examples from Mong Leeg (Green Hmong):

ob tug dlev
𖬒𖬰𖬮𖬰 𖬇𖬲𖬧𖬵 𖬉𖬭𖬰
𞄨𞄰 𞄃𞄧𞄶 𞄝𞄪𞄳
two CLF dog
'two dogs'

ob (tug) nyuas dlev
𖬒𖬰𖬮𖬰 (𖬇𖬲𖬧𖬵) 𖬑𖬲𖬮𖬵 𖬉𖬭𖬰
𞄨𞄰 (𞄃𞄧𞄶) 𞄐𞄧𞄤𞄴 𞄝𞄪𞄳
two CLF little dog
'two little dogs'

Also, classifiers may occur with a noun without any numerals for definite and/or specific reference in Hmong. The following examples are again from Green Hmong:

kuv pum dlev
𖬆𖬲 𖬆𖬪𖬵 𖬉𖬭𖬰
𞄎𞄧𞄳 𞄚𞄧𞄱 𞄝𞄪𞄳
1SG see dog
'I saw dogs/a dog.' (indefinite and non-specific)

kuv pum tug dlev
𖬆𖬲 𖬆𖬪𖬵 𖬇𖬲𖬧𖬵 𖬉𖬭𖬰
𞄎𞄧𞄳 𞄚𞄧𞄱 𞄃𞄧𞄶 𞄝𞄪𞄳
1SG see CLF dog
'I saw the dog.' (definite and specific)

kuv pum ib tug dlev
𖬆𖬲 𖬆𖬪𖬵 𖬂𖬲𖬮𖬰 𖬇𖬲𖬧𖬵 𖬉𖬭𖬰
𞄎𞄧𞄳 𞄚𞄧𞄱 𞄦𞄰 𞄃𞄧𞄶 𞄝𞄪𞄳
1SG see one CLF dog
'I saw a (specific) dog.' (indefinite and specific)

kuv pum ob tug dlev hov
𖬆𖬲 𖬆𖬪𖬵 𖬒𖬰𖬮𖬰 𖬇𖬲𖬧𖬵 𖬉𖬭𖬰 𖬒𖬶𖬟
𞄎𞄧𞄳 𞄚𞄧𞄱 𞄨𞄰 𞄃𞄧𞄶 𞄝𞄪𞄳 𞄄𞄨𞄳
1SG see two CLF dog DEM:3
'I saw those two dogs.' (definite and specific)

Moreover, nominal possessive phrases are expressed with a classifier; however, it may be omitted when the referent of the possessed noun is inalienable from the possessor as shown in the following Hmong Daw (White Hmong) phrases:

nws rab ntaj
𖬙𖬲𖬬 𖬖𖬲𖬡 𖬖𖬰𖬩𖬵
𞄅𞄬𞄴 𞄖𞄤𞄰 𞄂𞄤𞄲
3SG CLF sword
'his sword'

kuv txiv
𖬆𖬲 𖬂𖬶𖬯𖬵
𞄎𞄧𞄳 𞄔𞄦𞄳
1SG father
'my father'

Relativization is also expressed with classifiers.

Although absent in Mandarin Chinese, definite reference by bare classifier constructions are found in Cantonese (Sinitic) and Zhuang (Kra-dai), which is the case for possessive classifier constructions as well.

=== Verbs ===
Hmong is an isolating language in which most morphemes are monosyllables. As a result, verbs are not overtly inflected. Tense, aspect, mood, person, number, gender, and case are indicated lexically.

==== Serial verb construction ====
Hmong verbs can be serialized, with two or more verbs combined in one clause. It is common for as many as five verbs to be strung together, sharing the same subject.

Here is an example from White Hmong:

Yam zoo tshaj plaws, nej yuav tsum mus, nrhiav, nug, xyuas, saib luag muaj kev pab hom {dab tsi} nyob ncig ib {cheeb tsam} ntawm nej.
Zav jông tshax plơưs, nêx zuôr tsuv mus, nriêz, nuv, shuôs, saiz luôv muôj cêr paz hov {đaz tsi} nhoz ndil ib {qênhz tsav} ntơưv nêx.
𖬖𖬤 𖬍𖬥𖬰 𖬖𖬰𖬪𖬰 𖬏𖬰𖬟𖬵, 𖬈𖬲𖬬 𖬐𖬲𖬤 𖬆𖬝𖬰 𖬇𖬰𖬦, 𖬔𖬲𖬨𖬰, 𖬇𖬲𖬬, 𖬑𖬲𖬧𖬰, 𖬊𖬰𖬤𖬵 𖬑𖬶𖬞 𖬐𖬰𖬦 𖬉 𖬖𖬲𖬪𖬵 𖬒𖬟 {𖬖𖬲𖬞𖬰 𖬃𖬝𖬰} 𖬒𖬰𖬮𖬵 𖬃𖬲𖬤𖬰 𖬂𖬲𖬮𖬰 {𖬀𖬶𖬧 𖬖𖬝𖬰} 𖬎𖬰𖬩𖬵 𖬈𖬲𖬬.
𞄘𞄤𞄱 𞄋𞄩 𞄁𞄄𞄤𞄲 𞄡𞄤𞄬𞄴, 𞄅𞄪𞄲 𞄘𞄧𞄤𞄳 𞄁𞄧𞄱 𞄀𞄧𞄴, 𞄑𞄄𞄦𞄤𞄳, 𞄅𞄧𞄶, 𞄛𞄧𞄤𞄴, 𞄊𞄤𞄦𞄰 𞄉𞄧𞄤𞄶 𞄀𞄧𞄤𞄲 𞄎𞄪𞄳 𞄚𞄤𞄰 𞄄𞄨𞄱 {𞄏𞄤𞄰𞄁𞄦} 𞄐𞄨𞄰 𞄌𞄦𞄶 𞄦𞄰 {𞄈𞄄𞄫𞄰 𞄁𞄤𞄱} 𞄂𞄤𞄬𞄱 𞄅𞄪𞄲.
Thing best very full, 2PL IRR must go, seek, ask, examine, look others have services variations type what be.at around one area at 2PL
'The best thing you can do is to explore your neighborhood and find out what services are available.'

==== Tense ====
Because the verb form in Hmong does not change to indicate tense, the simplest way to indicate the time of an event is to use temporal adverb phrases like "last year," "today," or "next week."

Here is an example from White Hmong:

{Nag hmo} kuv mus tom khw.
{Nav hmo} cur mus tov khư.
𖬗𖬶𖬬 𖬓𖬰𖬣𖬵 𖬆𖬲 𖬇𖬰𖬦 𖬒𖬧𖬵 𖬙𖬰𖬩𖬰.
𞄅𞄤𞄵 𞄀𞄄𞄨 𞄎𞄧𞄳 𞄀𞄧𞄴 𞄃𞄨𞄱 𞄎𞄄𞄬.
yesterday I go LOC market
'I went to the market yesterday.'

==== Aspect ====
Aspectual differences are indicated by a number of verbal modifiers. Here are the most common ones:

Progressive: (Mong Leeg) taab tom + verb, (White Hmong) tab tom + verb = situation in progress

Puab {taab tom} haus dlej.
Puôz {tangz tov} hâus đrêx
𖬐𖬶𖬪𖬵 {𖬚𖬲𖬧𖬵 𖬒𖬧𖬵} 𖬅𖬰𖬟 𖬈𖬲𖬭.
𞄚𞄧𞄰𞄤 {𞄃𞄥𞄰 𞄃𞄨𞄱} 𞄄𞄤𞄴𞄨 𞄏𞄪𞄲.
they PROG drink water
'They are drinking water.'

Taab/tab tom + verb can also be used to indicate a situation that is about to start. That is clearest when taab/tab tom occurs in conjunction with the irrealis marker yuav. Note that the taab tom construction is not used if it is clear from the context that a situation is ongoing or about to begin.

Perfective: sentence/clause + lawm = completed situation

Kuv noj mov lawm.
Cur nox mor lơưv
𖬆𖬲 𖬒𖬲𖬬 𖬒𖬶𖬦 𖬎𖬰𖬞.
𞄎𞄧𞄳 𞄅𞄨𞄲 𞄀𞄨𞄳 𞄉𞄤𞄱𞄬.
I eat rice PERF
'I am finished/I am done eating rice.' / 'I have already eaten "rice".'

Lawm at the end of a sentence can also indicate that an action is underway:

Tus tub tau rab hneev, nws thiaj mus {ua si} lawm.
𖬇𖬰𖬧𖬵 𖬆𖬰𖬧𖬵 𖬧𖬵 𖬖𖬲𖬡 𖬀𖬲𖬩, 𖬙𖬲𖬬 𖬔𖬶𖬟𖬰 𖬇𖬰𖬦 𖬑𖬮𖬰 𖬃𖬤𖬵 𖬎𖬰𖬞.
𞄃𞄧𞄴 𞄃𞄧𞄰 𞄃𞄤𞄨 𞄖𞄤𞄰 𞄅𞄄𞄳𞄫, 𞄅𞄬𞄴 𞄃𞄄𞄦𞄲𞄤 𞄀𞄧𞄴 {𞄧𞄤 𞄊𞄦} 𞄉𞄤𞄱𞄬.
CLF boy get CLF crossbow he then go play PFV
'The boy got the crossbow and went off to play.' / 'The boy went off to play because he got the bow.'

Another common way to indicate the accomplishment of an action or attainment is by using tau, which, as a main verb, means 'to get/obtain.' It takes on different connotations when it is combined with other verbs. When it occurs before the main verb (i.e. tau + verb), it conveys the attainment or fulfillment of a situation. Whether the situation took place in the past, the present, or the future is indicated at the discourse level rather than the sentence level. If the event took place in the past, tau + verb translates to the past tense in English.

Lawv tau noj nqaij nyug.
𖬎𖬶𖬞 𖬧𖬵 𖬒𖬲𖬬 𖬊𖬶𖬬𖬰 𖬇𖬲𖬮𖬵.
𞄉𞄤𞄳𞄬 𞄃𞄤𞄨 𞄅𞄨𞄲 𞄙𞄤𞄲𞄦 𞄐𞄧𞄵.
they attain eat meat beef
'They ate beef.'

Tau is optional if an explicit past time marker is present (e.g. nag hmo, last night). Tau can also mark the fulfillment of a situation in the future:

Thaum txog peb caug lawm {sawv daws} thiaj tau hnav {khaub ncaws} tshiab.
𖬄𖬟𖬰 𖬓𖬯𖬵 𖬈𖬰𖬪𖬵 𖬅𖬲𖬯 𖬎𖬰𖬞 {𖬎𖬶𖬤𖬵 𖬏𖬰𖬞𖬰} 𖬔𖬶𖬟𖬰 𖬧𖬵 𖬗𖬩 {𖬄𖬰𖬩𖬰 𖬏𖬰𖬤𖬰} 𖬔𖬪𖬰.
𞄃𞄄𞄤𞄱𞄨 𞄔𞄨𞄵 𞄚𞄪𞄰 𞄈𞄤𞄵𞄨 𞄉𞄤𞄱𞄬 {𞄊𞄤𞄳𞄬 𞄏𞄤𞄴𞄬} 𞄃𞄄𞄦𞄲𞄤 𞄃𞄤𞄨 𞄅𞄄𞄳𞄤 {𞄎𞄄𞄤𞄰𞄨 𞄌𞄤𞄴𞄬} 𞄁𞄄𞄦𞄰𞄤.
when arrive New Year PFV everybody then attain wear clothes new
'So when the New Year arrives, everybody gets to wear new clothes.'

When tau follows the main verb (i.e. verb + tau), it indicates the accomplishment of the purpose of an action.

Kuv xaav xaav {ib plag}, kuv xaav tau {tswv yim}.
𖬆𖬲 𖬛𖬮 𖬛𖬮 {𖬂𖬲𖬮𖬰 𖬗𖬶𖬟𖬵}, 𖬆𖬲 𖬛𖬮 𖬧𖬵 𖬙𖬝𖬰 𖬂𖬤.
𞄎𞄧𞄳 𞄆𞄥𞄳 𞄆𞄥𞄳 {𞄦𞄰 𞄡𞄤𞄵}, 𞄎𞄧𞄳 𞄆𞄥𞄳 𞄃𞄤𞄨 {𞄁𞄬𞄳 𞄘𞄦𞄱}.
I think think awhile, I think get idea
'I thought it over and got an idea.'

Tau is also common in serial verb constructions that are made up of a verb, followed by an accomplishment: (White Hmong) nrhiav tau, to look for; caum tau, to chase; yug tau, to give birth.

==== Mood ====
The grammatical marker yuav is analyzed by some scholars as a future tense marker when it appears preceding a verb:

Kuv yuav moog.
𖬆𖬲 𖬐𖬲𖬤 𖬍𖬶𖬦.
𞄎𞄧𞄳 𞄘𞄧𞄳𞄤 𞄀𞄩𞄵.
'I will be going.'

Yuav can also be analyzed as a marker of irrealis mood, for situations that are unfulfilled or unrealized. That includes hypothetical or non-occurring situations with past, present, or future time references:

Tus Tsov {hais tias}, "Kuv tshaib tshaib plab li kuv yuav noj koj".
𖬇𖬰𖬧𖬵 𖬒𖬶𖬝𖬰 {𖬋𖬰𖬟 𖬕𖬰𖬧𖬵}, "𖬆𖬲 𖬊𖬰𖬪𖬰 𖬊𖬰𖬪𖬰 𖬖𖬲𖬟𖬵 𖬃𖬞 𖬆𖬲 𖬐𖬲𖬤 𖬒𖬲𖬬 𖬒𖬲."
𞄃𞄧𞄴 𞄁𞄨𞄳 {𞄄𞄤𞄴𞄦 𞄃𞄦𞄴𞄤}, "𞄎𞄧𞄳 𞄁𞄄𞄤𞄰𞄦 𞄁𞄄𞄤𞄰𞄦 𞄡𞄤𞄰 𞄉𞄦 𞄎𞄧𞄳 𞄘𞄧𞄳𞄤 𞄅𞄨𞄲 𞄎𞄨𞄲".
CLF Tiger say, I hungry hungry stomach INT I IRR eat you
'The Tiger said, "I'm very hungry and I'm going to eat you.'

Tus Qav tsis paub yuav ua li cas li.
𖬇𖬰𖬧𖬵 𖬗𖬦𖬵 𖬃𖬰𖬝𖬰 𖬄𖬰𖬪𖬵 𖬐𖬲𖬤 𖬑𖬮𖬰 𖬃𖬞 𖬗𖬲𖬯 𖬃𖬞.
𞄃𞄧𞄴 𞄗𞄤𞄳 𞄁𞄦𞄴 𞄚𞄤𞄰𞄨 𞄘𞄧𞄳𞄤 𞄧𞄤 𞄉𞄦 𞄈𞄤𞄴 𞄉𞄦.
CLF Frog NEG know IRR do {} what INT
'The frog didn't know what to do.'

== Vocabulary ==
=== Overview ===
Hmong vocabulary comes from several sources: native Hmongic words, Chinese borrowings, and Tibeto-Burman borrowings, as well as additional borrowings from the national languages where Hmong communities live outside China, including borrowings from Thai/Lao and English.

=== Domains ===
==== Colors ====
Many Hmong and non-Hmong people who are learning the Hmong language tend to use the word xim (a borrowing from Thai/Lao) as the word for 'color', while the native Hmong word for 'color' is kob. For example, xim appears in the sentence Liab yog xim ntawm kev phom sij with the meaning "Red is the color of danger / The red color is of danger".

List of colors:

The following color terms are given as in Hmong Daw (HD; White Hmong) and Mong Leeg (ML; Green Hmong).

𖬔𖬞 liab (HD); 𖬖𖬲𖬞; 𖬖𖬞 lab (ML) 'red'

𖬐𖬶𖬝; 𖬐𖬝 ntsuab 'green'

𖬖𖬝𖬰 𖬈𖬮; 𖬖𖬰𖬝𖬰 𖬈𖬰𖬮 tsam xem 'purple'

𖬆𖬰𖬞𖬰; 𖬆𖬞𖬰 dub (HD); 𖬆𖬰𖬭𖬰; 𖬆𖬞𖬰 dlub (ML) 'black'

𖬔𖬲𖬮; 𖬕𖬮 xiav (HD); 𖬗𖬮 xav (ML) 'blue'

𖬎𖬞𖬰 dawb (HD); 𖬎𖬭𖬰; 𖬎𖬞𖬰 dlawb (ML) 'white'

𖬗𖬮𖬰 / 𖬗𖬲 𖬉𖬲𖬜𖬵 av / kas fes 'brown'

𖬖𖬰𖬞𖬰; 𖬖𖬲𖬞𖬰 daj (HD); 𖬚𖬰𖬭𖬰; 𖬚𖬲𖬞𖬰 dlaaj (ML) 'yellow'

𖬓𖬰𖬦𖬰 txho 'grey'

𖬖𖬲 𖬙𖬢𖬰 kab ntxwv (HD); 𖬚𖬲 𖬙𖬢𖬰 kaab ntxwv (ML) 'orange'

𖬖𖬰𖬪𖬵 𖬀𖬶𖬤; 𖬖𖬲𖬪𖬵 𖬀𖬤 paj yeeb (HD); 𖬚𖬰𖬪𖬵 𖬀𖬰𖬤; 𖬚𖬲𖬪𖬵 𖬀𖬤 paaj yeeb (ML) 'pink'

Several of the Hmong terms for colors are native roots that date back to at least the Proto-Hmongic period, such as dub 'black', dawb 'white', and liab 'red', while daj 'yellow' was a very early borrowing from Chinese. Several other terms are more recent innovations.

==== Numbers ====
Numeral	Pahawh Hmong Numeral	Hmong RPA	Pahawh Hmong	Hmong Loanwords	Pahawh Symbols
0	𖭐	Ntxaiv	𖬊𖬲𖬢𖬰	Xoom (term from Thai/Lao)	𖭐 (Ones)
1	𖭑	Ib	𖬂𖬲𖬮𖬰		
2	𖭒	Ob	𖬒𖬰𖬮𖬰		
3	𖭓	Peb	𖬈𖬰𖬪𖬵		
4	𖭔	Plaub	𖬄𖬰𖬟𖬵		
5	𖭕	Tsib	𖬂𖬲𖬝𖬰		
6	𖭖	Rau	𖬡		
7	𖭗	Xya	𖬗𖬰𖬧𖬰		
8	𖭘	Yim	𖬂𖬤		
9	𖭙	Cuaj	𖬐𖬰𖬯		
10	𖭑𖭐	Kaum	𖬄		𖭛 (Tens)
11	𖭑𖭑	Kaum ib	𖬄 𖬂𖬲𖬮𖬰		
20	𖭒𖭐	Nees nkaum	𖬁𖬰𖬬 𖬄𖬢		
21	𖭒𖭑	Nees nkaum ib	𖬁𖬰𖬬 𖬄𖬢 𖬂𖬲𖬮𖬰		
30	𖭓𖭐	Peb caug	𖬈𖬰𖬪𖬵 𖬅𖬲𖬯		
31	𖭓𖭑	Peb caug ib	𖬈𖬰𖬪𖬵 𖬅𖬲𖬯 𖬂𖬲𖬮𖬰		
40	𖭔𖭐	Plaub caug	𖬄𖬰𖬟𖬵 𖬅𖬲𖬯		
41	𖭔𖭑	Plaub caug ib	𖬄𖬰𖬟𖬵 𖬅𖬲𖬯 𖬂𖬲𖬮𖬰		
50	𖭕𖭐	Tsib caug	𖬂𖬲𖬝𖬰 𖬅𖬲𖬯		
51	𖭕𖭑	Tsib caug ib	𖬂𖬲𖬝𖬰 𖬅𖬲𖬯 𖬂𖬲𖬮𖬰		
60	𖭖𖭐	Rau caum	𖬡 𖬄𖬯		
61	𖭖𖭑	Rau caum ib	𖬡 𖬄𖬯 𖬂𖬲𖬮𖬰		
70	𖭗𖭐	Xya caum	𖬗𖬰𖬧𖬰 𖬄𖬯		
71	𖭗𖭑	Xya caum ib	𖬗𖬰𖬧𖬰 𖬄𖬯 𖬂𖬲𖬮𖬰		
80	𖭘𖭐	Yim caum	𖬂𖬤 𖬄𖬯		
81	𖭘𖭑	Yim caum ib	𖬂𖬤 𖬄𖬯 𖬂𖬲𖬮𖬰		
90	𖭙𖭐	Cuaj caum	𖬐𖬰𖬯 𖬄𖬯		
91	𖭙𖭑	Cuaj caum ib	𖬐𖬰𖬯 𖬄𖬯 𖬂𖬲𖬮𖬰		
100	𖭑𖭐	Ib puas	𖬂𖬲𖬮𖬰 𖬑𖬲𖬪𖬵		𖭜 (Hundreds)
1,000	𖭑,𖭐𖭐𖭐	Ib txhiab	𖬂𖬲𖬮𖬰 𖬔𖬦𖬰	Ib phav (Thai/Lao word)	𖭜𖭐 (Thousands)
10,000	𖭑𖭐,𖭐𖭐𖭐	Kaum txhiab	𖬄 𖬔𖬦𖬰	Kaum phav (Thai/Lao word)	𖭝 (Ten thousand)
100,000	𖭑𖭐𖭐,𖭐𖭐𖭐	Ib puas txhiab	𖬂𖬲𖬮𖬰 𖬑𖬲𖬪𖬵 𖬔𖬦𖬰	Ib puas phav (Thai/Lao word)	𖭝𖭐 (Hundred Thousands)
1,000,000	𖭑,𖭐𖭐𖭐,𖭐𖭐𖭐	Ib roob	𖬂𖬲𖬮𖬰 𖬌𖬡	Ib lab (Thai/Lao word)	𖭞 (Millions)
10,000,000	𖭑𖭐,𖭐𖭐𖭐,𖭐𖭐𖭐	Kaum roob	𖬄 𖬌𖬡	Kaum lab (Thai/Lao word)	𖭞𖭐 (Ten Millions)
100,000,000	𖭑𖭐𖭐,𖭐𖭐𖭐,𖭐𖭐𖭐	Ib puas roob	𖬂𖬲𖬮𖬰 𖬑𖬲𖬪𖬵 𖬌𖬡	Ib puas lab (Thai/Lao word)	𖭟 (Hundred Millions)
1,000,000,000	𖭑,𖭐𖭐𖭐,𖭐𖭐𖭐,𖭐𖭐𖭐	Ib kem	𖬂𖬲𖬮𖬰 𖬈	Ib phav lab (Thai/Lao word)	𖭟𖭐 (Billions)
10,000,000,000	𖭑𖭐,𖭐𖭐𖭐,𖭐𖭐𖭐,𖭐𖭐𖭐	Kaum kem	𖬄 𖬈	Kaum phav lab (Thai/Lao word)	𖭠 (Ten Billions)
100,000,000,000	𖭑𖭐𖭐,𖭐𖭐𖭐,𖭐𖭐𖭐,𖭐𖭐𖭐	Ib puas kem	𖬂𖬲𖬮𖬰 𖬑𖬲𖬪𖬵 𖬈	Ib puas phav lab (Thai/Lao word)	𖭠𖭐 (Hundred Billions)
1,000,000,000,000	𖭑,𖭐𖭐𖭐,𖭐𖭐𖭐,𖭐𖭐𖭐,𖭐𖭐𖭐	Ib tas	𖬂𖬲𖬮𖬰 𖬗𖬧𖬵	Ib lab lab (Thai/Lao word)	𖭡 (Trillions)

The number 57023 would be written as 𖭕𖭗𖭐𖭒𖭓.

==== Days of the week ====
Days	Hmong RPA	Pahawh Hmong	Hmong Loanwords (from Thai/Lao)
Sunday	Zwj hnub	𖬘𖬲𖬥𖬰 𖬆𖬰𖬩	Vas thiv
Monday	Zwj hli	𖬘𖬲𖬥𖬰 𖬃𖬥	Vas cas
Tuesday	Zwj quag	𖬘𖬲𖬥𖬰 𖬑𖬶𖬦𖬵	Vas as qhas
Wednesday	Zwj feeb	𖬘𖬲𖬥𖬰 𖬀𖬶𖬜𖬵	Vas phuv
Thursday	Zwj teeb	𖬘𖬲𖬥𖬰 𖬀𖬶𖬧𖬵	Vas phab hav
Friday	Zwj kuab	𖬘𖬲𖬥𖬰 𖬐𖬶	Vas xuv
Saturday	Zwj cag	𖬘𖬲𖬥𖬰 𖬗𖬶𖬯	Vas xom ~ Vas xaum

A sentence like "Today is Monday" in Hmong, using only non-borrowed, non-calqued terms, would be said as Hnub no yog zwj hli, rather than Hnub no yog Monday. However, Hmong speakers in English-speaking countries sometimes use Thai/Lao loanwords or English terms for the days of the week instead, as in Mong Leng ua ntej nub Saturday 'before Saturday'.

==== Months of the year ====
Months	Formal, Hmong RPA	Pahawh Hmong	Informal, Hmong RPA
January	Tsov hli; tsuv hli	𖬒𖬶𖬝𖬰 𖬃𖬥; 𖬆𖬲𖬝𖬰 𖬃𖬥	Ib hlis
February	Luav hli	𖬐𖬲𖬞 𖬃𖬥	Ob hlis
March	Zaj hli; zaaj hli	𖬖𖬰𖬥𖬰 𖬃𖬥	Peb hlis
April	Neeg hli	𖬁𖬲𖬬 𖬃𖬥	Plaub hlis
May	Nees hli; neeg hli	𖬁𖬰𖬬 𖬃𖬥	Tsib hlis
June	Yaj hli; yaaj hli	𖬖𖬰𖬤 𖬃𖬥	Rau hlis
July	Dev hli; dlev hli	𖬉𖬞𖬰 𖬃𖬥	Xya hlis
August	Qai hli; qa hli	𖬋𖬦𖬵 𖬃𖬥 𖬗𖬰𖬦𖬵 𖬃𖬥	Yim hlis
September	Liab hli; lab hli	𖬔𖬞 𖬃𖬥	Cuaj hlis
October	Npua hli	𖬑𖬨𖬵 𖬃𖬥	Kaum hlis
November	Nas hli; naag hli	𖬗𖬲𖬬 𖬃𖬥	Kaum ib hlis
December	Nyuj hli	𖬆𖬶𖬮𖬵 𖬃𖬥	Kaum ob hlis

The Hmong people traditionally followed the Chinese lunar calendar, but starts the year with the month of the Rabbit instead of the month of the Tiger. Most Hmong speakers, however, would also use numerals to keep track of months and days instead, as in Hmong Daw ua ntej ob hlis 'before February'.

== Worldwide usage ==
=== Presence in community and education ===
The Hmong language has found a significant presence in the United States, particularly in Minnesota. The Hmong people first arrived in Minnesota in late 1975 following the communist seizure of power in Indochina. Many educated Hmong elites with leadership experience and English-language skills were among the first to be welcomed by Minnesotans. These elites worked to solidify the social services targeted to refugees, attracting others to migrate to the region. The first Hmong family arrived in Minnesota on 5 November 1975.

The Hmong language program in the Department of Asian and Middle Eastern Studies at the University of Minnesota is one of the first programs in the United States to teach language-accredited Hmong classes.

=== Translation ===
In February 2012, Microsoft released "Hmong Daw" as an option in Bing Translator. In May 2013, Google Translate introduced support for Hmong Daw (referred to only as Hmong).

Research in nursing shows that when translating from English to Hmong, the translator must take into account that Hmong comes from an oral tradition and equivalent concepts may not exist. For example, the word and concept for "prostate" does not exist.

== Sample texts ==
Article 1 of the Universal Declaration of Human Rights in Hmong:

Pahawh Hmong:

𖬑𖬦𖬰 𖬇𖬰𖬧𖬵 𖬁𖬲𖬬 𖬇𖬲𖬤 𖬓𖬲𖬞 𖬐𖬰𖬦 𖬉 𖬘𖬲𖬤 𖬀𖬰𖬝𖬵 𖬔𖬟𖬰 𖬂𖬲𖬤𖬵 𖬅𖬲𖬨𖬵 𖬓𖬲𖬥𖬰 𖬄𖬲𖬟 𖬒𖬲𖬯𖬵 𖬋𖬯. 𖬎𖬶𖬞 𖬖𖬰𖬮 𖬓𖬜𖬰 𖬆𖬰𖬞 𖬖𖬞𖬰 𖬎𖬲𖬟𖬰 𖬔𖬟𖬰 𖬆𖬰𖬞 𖬔𖬤𖬵 𖬔𖬟𖬰 𖬂𖬮𖬰 𖬁𖬲𖬞 𖬐𖬲𖬤 𖬆𖬝𖬰 𖬒𖬲𖬯 𖬅𖬮𖬰 𖬉𖬰 𖬎𖬰𖬩𖬵 𖬂𖬲𖬮𖬰 𖬁𖬲𖬞 𖬎𖬰𖬩𖬵 𖬒𖬲𖬯𖬵 𖬉 𖬅𖬮𖬰 𖬙 𖬂𖬰𖬧𖬵.

Nyiakeng Puachue:

𞄔𞄄𞄧𞄤𞄃𞄧𞄴𞄅𞄫𞄵𞄘𞄧𞄵𞄉𞄨𞄴 𞄀𞄧𞄲𞄤𞄎𞄪𞄳𞄘𞄬𞄲𞄚𞄄𞄲𞄫𞄃𞄄𞄦𞄰𞄤 𞄊𞄦𞄰𞄜𞄤𞄵𞄨𞄋𞄨𞄴 𞄄𞄤𞄳𞄨𞄔𞄨𞄲𞄈𞄤𞄦. 𞄉𞄤𞄳𞄬𞄆𞄤𞄲 𞄑𞄨𞄵𞄉𞄧𞄰𞄉𞄤𞄲𞄃𞄄𞄤𞄲𞄬 𞄃𞄄𞄦𞄰𞄤𞄉𞄧𞄰𞄊𞄦𞄰𞄤𞄃𞄄𞄦𞄰𞄤 𞄦𞄰𞄉𞄫𞄵𞄘𞄧𞄳𞄤𞄁𞄧𞄱𞄈𞄨𞄲 𞄧𞄤 𞄎𞄪𞄂𞄤𞄱𞄬𞄦𞄰𞄉𞄫𞄵𞄂𞄤𞄱𞄬𞄔𞄨𞄲𞄎𞄪𞄧𞄳 𞄧𞄤𞄎𞄬𞄳𞄃𞄦𞄲.

Hmong RPA:

Txhua tus neeg yug los muaj kev ywj pheej thiab sib npaug zos hauv txoj cai. Lawv xaj nrog lub laj thawj thiab lub siab thiab ib leeg yuav tsum coj ua ke ntawm ib leeg ntawm txoj kev ua kwv tij.

Vietnamese Hmong:

Cxuô tus nênhl zul los muôx cêr zưx fênhx thiêz siz npâul jôs hâur txox chai. Lơưr xax ndol luz lax thơưx thiêz luz siêz thiêz iz lênhl zuôr tsuv chox uô cê ntơưv iz lênhl ntơưv txôx cêr uô cưr tiz.

Hmong IPA:

tsʰuə˧ tu˩ neŋ˧˩̤ ʝu˧˩̤ lɒ˩ muə˥˧ ke˧˧˦ ʝɨ˥˧ pʰeŋ˥˧ tʰiə˦ ʂi˦ ᵐbau˧˩̤ ʐɒ˩ hau˧˦ tsɒ˥˧ cai˧. Laɨ˧˦ sa˥˧ ᶯɖɒ˧˩̤ lu˦ la˥˧ tʰaɨ˥˧ tʰiə˦ lu˦ ʂiə˦ tʰiə˦ i˦ leŋ˧˩̤ ʝuə˧˦ tʂu˩̰ cɒ˥˧ uə˧ ke˧ ⁿdaɨ˩̰ i˦ leŋ˧˩̤ ⁿdaɨ˩̰ tsɒ˥˧ ke˧˧˦ uə˧ kɨ˧˦ ti˥˧.

English:

All human beings are born free and equal in dignity and rights. They are endowed with reason and conscience and should act towards one another in a spirit of brotherhood.

Sample text in Hmong RPA, Pahawh Hmong, and Hmong IPA:

Hmong RPA:

Hmoob yog ib nywj keeb neeg uas yeej nrog ntiaj teb neeg tib txhij tshwm sim los. Niaj hnoob tam sim no tseem muaj nyob thoob plaws hauv ntiaj teb, xws: es xias, yus lauv, auv tas lias, thiab as mes lis kas. Hom neeg Hmoob no yog thooj li cov neeg nyob sab es xias. Tab sis nws muaj nws puav pheej teej tug, moj kuab, txuj ci, mooj kav moj coj, thiab txheeb meem mooj meej kheej ib yam nkaus li lwm haiv neeg. Hmoob yog ib hom neeg uas nyiam txoj kev ncaj ncees, nyiam kev ywj pheej, nyiam phooj ywg, muaj kev cam hwm, muaj txoj kev sib hlub, sib pab thiab sib tshua heev.

Pahawh Hmong:

𖬌𖬣𖬵 𖬓𖬤 𖬂𖬲𖬮𖬰 𖬘𖬲𖬮𖬵 𖬀𖬶 𖬁𖬲𖬬 𖬑𖬲𖬮𖬰 𖬀𖬰𖬤 𖬓𖬜𖬰 𖬔𖬶𖬩𖬵 𖬈𖬰𖬧𖬵 𖬁𖬲𖬬 𖬂𖬲𖬧𖬵 𖬂𖬰𖬦𖬰 𖬘𖬪𖬰 𖬂𖬤𖬵 𖬓𖬲𖬞. 𖬔𖬶𖬬 𖬌𖬩 𖬖𖬧𖬵 𖬂𖬤𖬵 𖬓𖬰𖬬 𖬓𖬲𖬞 𖬀𖬝𖬰 𖬐𖬰𖬦 𖬒𖬰𖬮𖬵 𖬌𖬟𖬰 𖬏𖬰𖬟𖬵 𖬄𖬲𖬟 𖬔𖬶𖬩𖬵 𖬈𖬰𖬧𖬵, 𖬙𖬲𖬮 𖬃𖬞: 𖬉𖬲𖬮𖬰 𖬕𖬰𖬮, 𖬇𖬰𖬤 𖬄𖬲𖬞, 𖬄𖬲𖬮𖬰 𖬗𖬲𖬧𖬵 𖬕𖬰𖬞, 𖬔𖬟𖬰 𖬗𖬲𖬮𖬰 𖬉𖬲𖬦 𖬃𖬰𖬞 𖬗𖬲. 𖬒𖬟 𖬁𖬲𖬬 𖬌𖬣𖬵 𖬓𖬰𖬬 𖬓𖬤 𖬌𖬲𖬟𖬰 𖬃𖬞 𖬒𖬶𖬯 𖬁𖬲𖬬 𖬒𖬰𖬮𖬵 𖬖𖬲𖬤𖬵 𖬉𖬲𖬮𖬰 𖬕𖬰𖬮. 𖬖𖬲𖬧𖬵 𖬃𖬰𖬤𖬵 𖬙𖬲𖬬 𖬐𖬰𖬦 𖬙𖬲𖬬 𖬐𖬲𖬪𖬵 𖬀𖬰𖬝𖬵 𖬀𖬰𖬧𖬵 𖬇𖬲𖬧𖬵, 𖬒𖬲𖬦 𖬐𖬶, 𖬆𖬶𖬯𖬵 𖬃𖬯, 𖬌𖬲𖬦 𖬗 𖬒𖬲𖬦 𖬒𖬲𖬯, 𖬔𖬟𖬰 𖬀𖬶𖬦𖬰 𖬀𖬦 𖬌𖬲𖬦 𖬀𖬰𖬦 𖬀𖬰𖬩𖬰 𖬂𖬲𖬮𖬰 𖬖𖬤 𖬅𖬰𖬢 𖬃𖬞 𖬘𖬞 𖬊𖬲𖬟 𖬁𖬲𖬬. 𖬌𖬣𖬵 𖬓𖬤 𖬂𖬲𖬮𖬰 𖬒𖬟 𖬁𖬲𖬬 𖬑𖬲𖬮𖬰 𖬔𖬰𖬮𖬵 𖬒𖬲𖬯𖬵 𖬉 𖬖𖬰𖬤𖬰 𖬁𖬰𖬤𖬰, 𖬔𖬰𖬮𖬵 𖬉 𖬘𖬲𖬤 𖬀𖬰𖬝𖬵, 𖬔𖬰𖬮𖬵 𖬌𖬲𖬝𖬵 𖬙𖬶𖬤, 𖬐𖬰𖬦 𖬉 𖬖𖬯 𖬘𖬟, 𖬐𖬰𖬦 𖬒𖬲𖬯𖬵 𖬉 𖬂𖬲𖬤𖬵 𖬆𖬰𖬥, 𖬂𖬲𖬤𖬵 𖬖𖬲𖬪𖬵 𖬔𖬟𖬰 𖬂𖬲𖬤𖬵 𖬑𖬪𖬰 𖬀𖬲𖬟.

Hmong IPA:

mɒŋ˦ ʝɒ˧˩̤ i˦ ɲɨ˥˧ keŋ˦ neŋ˧˩̤ uə˩ ʝeŋ˥˧ ᶯɖɒ˧˩̤ ⁿdiə˥˧ te˦ neŋ˧˩̤ ti˦ tsʰi˥˧ tʂʰɨ˩̰ ʂi˩̰ lɒ˩. Niə˥˧ n̥ɒŋ˦ ta˩̰ ʂi˩̰ nɒ˧ tʂeŋ˩̰ muə˥˧ ɲɒ˦ tʰɒŋ˦ pˡaɨ˩ hau˧˦ ⁿdiə˥˧ te˦, sɨ˩: e˩ siə˩, ʝu˩ lau˧˦, au˧˦ ta˩ li˧ə˩, tʰiə˦ a˩ me˩ li˧˩ ka˩. Hɒ˩̰ neŋ˧˩̤ M̥ɒŋ˦ nɒ˧ ʝɒ˧˩̤ tʰɒŋ˥˧ li˧ cɒ˧˦ neŋ˧˩̤ ɲɒ˦ ʂa˦ e˩ siə˩. Ta˦ ʂi˩ nɨ˩ muə˥˧ nɨ˩ puə˧˦ pʰeŋ˥˧ teŋ˥˧ tu˧˩̤, mɒ˥˧ kuə˦, tsu˥˧ ci˧, mɒŋ˥˧ ka˧˦ mɒ˥˧ cɒ˥˧, tʰiə˦ tsʰeŋ˦ meŋ˩̰ mɒŋ˥˧ meŋ˥˧ kʰeŋ˥˧ i˦ ʝa˩̰ ᵑɡau˩ li˧ lɨ˩̰ hai˧˦ neŋ˧˩̤. M̥ɒŋ˦ ʝɒ˧˩̤ i˦ Hɒ˩̰ neŋ˧˩̤ uə˩ ɲiə˩̰ tsɒ˥˧ ke˧˦ ᶮɟa˥˧ ᶮɟeŋ˩, ɲiə˩̰ ke˧˦ ʝɨ˥˧ pʰeŋ˥˧, ɲiə˩̰ pʰɒŋ˥˧ ʝɨ˧˩̤, muə˥˧ ke˧˦ ca˩̰ hɨ˩̰, muə˥˧ tsɒ˥˧ ke˧˦ ʂi˦ l̥u˦, ʂi˦ pa˦ tʰiə˦ ʂi˦ tʂʰuə˧ heŋ˧˦.

== In popular culture ==
The 2008 film Gran Torino by Clint Eastwood features a large American Hmong speaking cast. The screenplay was written in English and the actors improvised the Hmong parts of the script. The decision to cast Hmong actors received a positive reception in Hmong communities. The film also gained recognition and collected awards such as the Ten Best Films of 2008 from the American Film Institute and a César Award in France for Best Foreign Film.

== Films ==
The following films feature the Hmong language:

- 2008 – "Gran Torino". Directed by Clint Eastwood; produced by Clint Eastwood, Bill Gerber, Robert Lorenz. The story follows Walt Kowalski, a recently widowed Korean War veteran alienated from his family and angry at the world. Walt's young neighbor, Thao Vang Lor, is pressured by his cousin into trying to steal Walt's prized 1972 Ford Torino for his initiation into a gang. Walt thwarts the theft and subsequently develops a relationship with the boy and his family.
- 2011 – "Bittersweet Tears (Kua Muag Iab)". Directors by Kelly Vang & Mandy Xiong; Writer: Kelly Vang. Bittersweet Tears is a romantic comedy about a vengeful and bittersweet love between Gaomao (Jenny Lor) and Vong (Beng Hang). Vong is the only son of Chong Yee (Billy Yang). Having lost everything Gaomao swears vengeance on Chong Yee, the man whom she claims to be responsible for her loss. Will Gaomao be able to overcome her own heart and take her revenge?
- 2016 – "1985". Director and writer by Kang Vang. When an adventurous Hmong teen discovers a secret map to a mythical dragon, he and his three best friends decide to go on a quest that leads them on a journey filled with danger, excitement, and self-discovery.

== See also ==
- Hmong people
- Nyiakeng Puachue Hmong
- Pahawh Hmong
- Romanized Popular Alphabet

== Notes ==
^{a} Ethnologue uses the term "Hmong" as a "macrolanguage", i.e., along the lines of the Chinese 苗语 Miáoyǔ "Miao language", to handle the fact that some mainland Chinese academic sources lump many individual languages together into single "language" categories, while international sources almost universally keep these languages distinct. As the current article is focused on the Hmong language proper as found in international published sources, the population figure here reflects this. Ethnologue (17th edition) lists the population of the larger macrolanguage at 8.1 million.

== Bibliography ==
- Bisang, Walter (1993). "Classifiers, Quantifiers and Class Nouns in Hmong". Studies in Language. 17 (1). John Benjamins Publishing Company: 1–51. doi:10.1075/sl.17.1.02bis. ISSN 0378-4177.
- Cooper, Robert, ed. (1998). The Hmong: A Guide to Traditional Lifestyles. Singapore: Times Editions. pp. 35–41.
- Enfield, N. J. (2018). Mainland Southeast Asian Languages: A Concise Typological Introduction. Cambridge: Cambridge University Press. doi:10.1017/9781139019552. ISBN 9781139019552. S2CID 133621227.
- Finck, John (1982). "Clan Leadership in the Hmong Community of Providence, Rhode Island". In Downing, Bruce T.; Olney, Douglas P. (eds.). The Hmong in the West. Minneapolis, MN: Southeast Asian Refugee Studies Project, Center for Urban and Regional Affairs, University of Minnesota. pp. 22–25.
- Jaisser, Annie (1984). Complementation in Hmong (MA thesis). San Diego State University.
- Matthews, Stephen (2007). "Cantonese Grammar in Areal Perspective". In Aikhenvald, Alexandra Y.; Dixon, R. M. W. (eds.). Grammars in Contact: A Cross-Linguistic Typology. Oxford: Oxford University Press. pp. 220–236. doi:10.1093/oso/9780199207831.003.0009. ISBN 978-0-19-920783-1.
- Mortensen, David (2019). "Hmong (Mong Leng)". In Vittrant, Alice; Watkins, Justin (eds.). The Mainland Southeast Asia Linguistic Area. Berlin and New York: De Gruyter Mouton. pp. 609–652. doi:10.1515/9783110401981-014. ISBN 978-3-11-040198-1. S2CID 195399573.
- Mottin, Jean (1978). Éléments de grammaire Hmong Blanc. Bangkok: Don Bosco Press.
- Ratliff, Martha (2010). Hmong-Mien Language History. Canberra: Pacific Linguistics.
- Simpson, Andrew; Soh, Hooi Ling; Nomoto, Hiroki (2011). "Bare Classifiers and Definiteness: A Cross-linguistic Investigation". Studies in Language. 35 (1). John Benjamins Publishing Company: 168–193.
- Thao, Paoze (1999). Mong Education at the Crossroads. New York: University Press of America. pp. 12–13.
- White, Nathan (2014). Non-spatial Setting in White Hmong (MA thesis). Trinity Western University.
- White, Nathan (2020). "Word in Hmong". In Aikhenvald, Alexandra Y.; Dixon, R. M. W.; White, Nathan (eds.). Phonological Word and Grammatical Word: A Cross-linguistic Typology. Oxford: Oxford University Press. pp. 213–259.
- White, Nathan (2021). "Language and variety mixing in diasporic Hmong". Italian Journal of Linguistics. 33 (1): 157–180. doi:10.26346/1120-2726-172.
- Xiong, Yuyou; Cohen, Diana (2005). Student's Practical Miao–Chinese–English Handbook / Npout Ndeud Xof Geuf Lol Hmongb Lol Shuad Lol Yenb. Yunnan Nationalities Publishing House. p. 539. ISBN 7-5367-3287-2.
