= Zong Zoua Her =

Hmong political leader (died 2000)

Zoov Zuag Hawj
- 𖬍𖬥𖬰 𖬑𖬶𖬥𖬰 𖬎𖬲𖬟
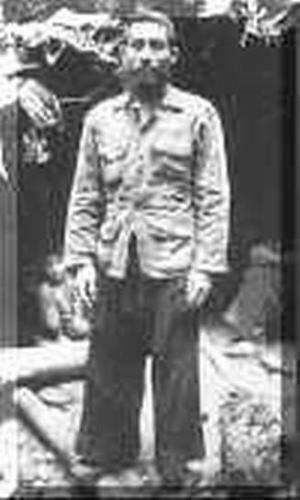
- Pronunciation: [ʐɔ̃̌ ʐṳə hâɨ]
- Born: Laos
- Died: 2000 in his base area on Phou Bia Mountain
- Known for: An earlier leader of the anti-Lao government

Zong Zoua Her (alternate spelling Tsong Zua Heu; RPA: Zoov Zuag Hawj [ʐɔ̃̌ ʐṳə hâɨ], Pahawh: 𖬍𖬥𖬰 𖬑𖬶𖬥𖬰 𖬎𖬲𖬟 [ʐɔ̃̌ ʐṳə hâɨ]) was an ethnic Hmong. He was a Major in the Royal Lao Army before 1975. He was a key follower of Shong Lue Yang, also known as the "Mother of Writing", who developed the script called Pahawh Hmong. After 1975, he was the main early leader of the Hmong ChaoFa movement in Laos, until dying in his base area on Phou Bia Mountain in around 2000.

In the late 1970s he worked closely with Pa Kao Her, who later became the President of the Ethnic Liberation Organization of Laos (ELOL), which eventually became the ChaoFa Democratic Party. Pa Kao Her was assassinated in Chiang Rai, Thailand, in 2002.
