= Hmong writing =

Writing systems used for transcribing Hmongic languages

Hmong writing refers to the various writing systems that have been used for transcribing various Hmongic languages, spoken by Hmong people in China, Vietnam, Laos, the United States, and Thailand, these being the top five countries. Over a dozen scripts have been reported for Hmong, none of which is considered standard for transcribing the languages in the eyes of the speakers.

== Historically referenced scripts ==
It is unknown whether a historic writing system existed for the Hmong. Several Hmong scripts have been noted in historical works, mostly in Chinese literature, as illustrated in the below sections. However, this evidence is disputed. For instance, according to Professor S. Robert Ramsey, there was no writing system among the Miao until the missionaries created them. Archaeologists are still searching for artifacts from periods of alleged Hmong literacy. These five scripts below are the most widely evidenced in primary literature sources:

=== Nanman script ===
From Chinese legends, the Nanman are largely considered to be the ancestors of the Hmong, also known as one of the "Four Barbarians" against the Huaxia, the ancestors of the Han. The Nanman lived originally in central-east China, but after battle losses and the expulsion of Chi You, who is allegedly considered a Godlike figure by the Hmong, the Nanman fled to the south. Different stories exist as to how their script and already encoded information disappeared: that the books were lost in a flood, that the Hmong had to eat the books as food due to the Chinese invasion, that they were eaten by other animals in their escapade from the Chinese, or that they had no way to cross the river without disposing of the books. All the stories have in common a loss of the books, water, and an invading Chinese tribe. This script has not been found.

=== Paj Ntaub (Flower Cloth) ===
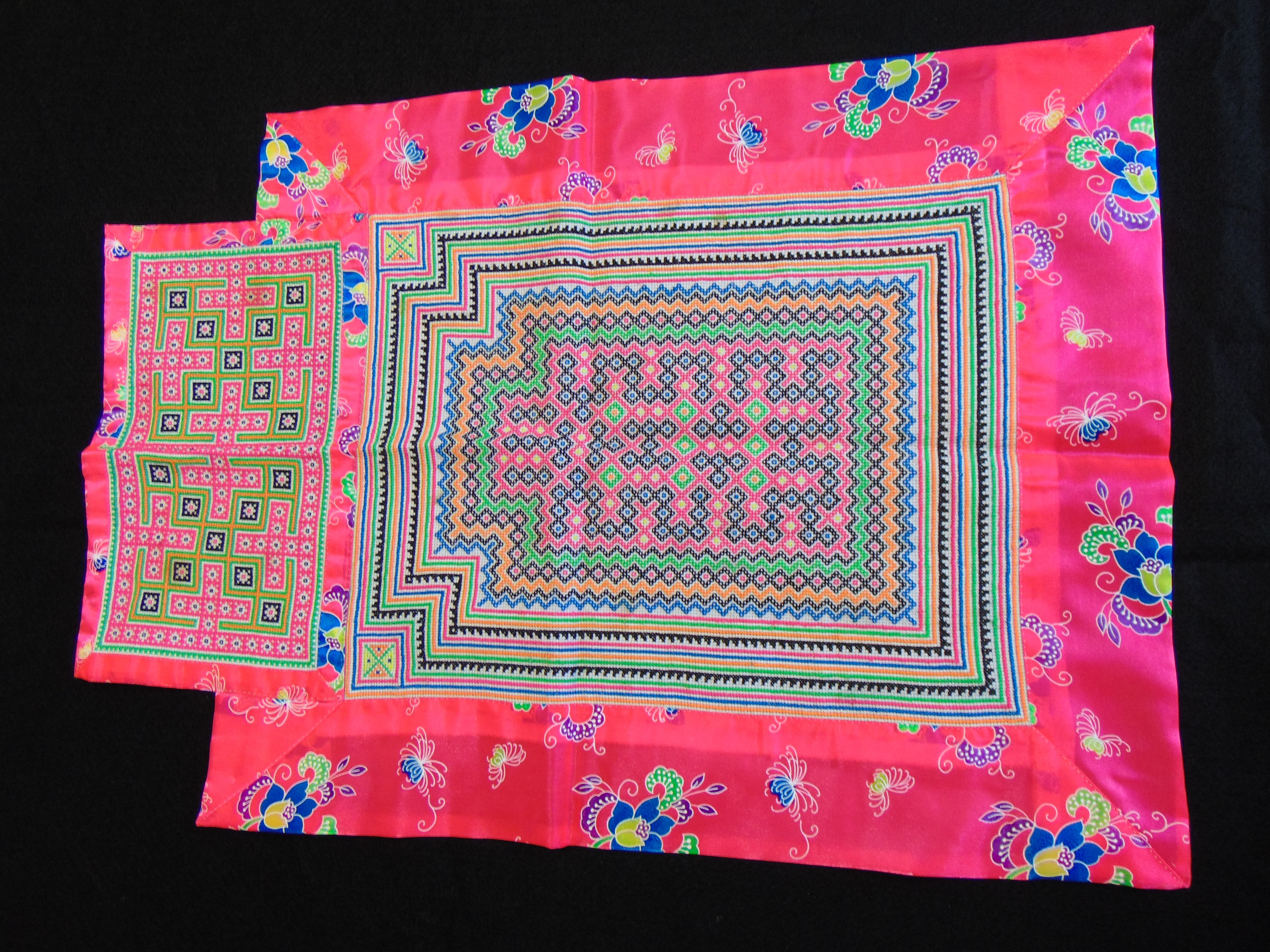
Flower cloth baby carrier

In response to the Chinese invasion, the Hmong claim that they preserved their ancient writing system in the "flower cloth" of the women. This seems to be a common story in response to the deluge and loss of books in the aftermath of the loss of the Nanman to the Huaxia. A modern script on the Internet known as the "Ancient Hmong Written System" claims to be a decipherment of this script, but no connection has been asserted from a neutral, reliable source. These symbols show the models of nature and architecture of the land where the Hmong people used to live. All of the designs in the Pau Ntaub have symbolism and meanings such as hearts, houses, and animals.

=== Qing Dynasty script ===
It is unknown whether this script differs from that of the Nanman, but it is known that as far as the Qing dynasty, the Hmong used a writing system to record information. It is unclear for how long they used this script, as Han settlers largely moved into the southern regions of China (where the Hmong lived), only during the Ming and Qing dynasties. In attempts to coerce the Hmong, also known as the Miao, Hmong villages were burned and relics of Hmong culture were destroyed. Hmongs were also banned from transcribing their language, so it is not known whether any Hmong writing from the era remains or where it remains.

=== Shaoyang Relics script ===
The "Book from Heaven" seems to be engraved in a Miao script, as reported in March 2012 from Shaoyang, Hunan. The Hunan Cultural Relic Department is reportedly investigating the script and any connections it may have. This may represent either the Qing script or the Nanman script, if dated, but any connections and authenticity are unclear.

=== Monumental Script ===
A group of monuments across Southern China written in Chinese-looking characters are reported to be those of an "Old Miao script". A particular monument in Leigongshan, Guizhou has been found with a residual monument inscribing "This year is also a good year." This is preserved in the Guizhou Provincial Museum. These characters are referred to in the Qing dynasty book, 洞溪纤志.

== Widely used scripts ==
=== Pollard script ===
The Pollard script was published in 1922 by Sam Pollard for writing A-Hmao, a Hmongic language in Sichuan, China. Published sources seem to indicate that the use of the script was widespread amongst Hmong in Sichuan; however, its use is waning, although it is held in esteem by Hmong of the Christian community and by elders. The current extent of its use is unknown.

=== Pahawh Hmong ===
Pahawh Hmong

Pahawh Hmong is one of the most successful indigenous scripts to have ever been created by illiterates. It was created by Shong Lue Yang, who was born in 1930 to a farmer. He was seen by the Hmong people as a "Chao Fa", or "Lord of the Sky", which makes him akin to the son of God in Hmong culture. He has a long history that began with the receipt of a divine mandate from the deity "Va", of whom he proclaimed he was the son. He apparently was visited in an isolated round house by two men from God, who taught him the script over the course of 60 days. When he came out and taught people the script, it gained a widespread following. However, two political problems emerged. First, both the French government and the Lao government began to view him with enmity as a result of his influence. Second, due to the military success of Pa Chai's followers, these governments began to associate him with a military agenda, even though none is known to have existed. Thus, he was assassinated in 1971. His script survived through his followers, however, and he even created a script called Pahawh Khmu for the Khmu language.

=== Ntawv Thoob Teb (RPA) ===
This script, known as the Romanized Popular Alphabet, was developed from 1951 to 1953 by Christian missionaries Yves Bertrais, G. Lindwood Barney, and William A. Smalley. Due to the widespread existence of the Roman script, in the United States, this script remains the most widely adopted among Hmong diaspora. It is also widely used on the Internet. These writing systems consists of symbolizing pronunciations more than meaningful words, portraying how the writing system looks more to produce accurate tones and pronunciations. Inaccurate tones and pronunciations can misrepresent the meanings of the words. However, controversy surrounding the script includes its representation of consonants in clusters, where many Hmong argue that the consonants are distinct and should not be represented in clusters of two or three. It is gaining popularity in China, but it is relatively disdained by speakers of Hmong Leng. It is seen as a more "pragmatic" solution to Hmong writing but a less "faithful" solution, as Hmongs hold Shong Lue Yang, and less indicative of a Hmong "identity".

=== Nyiakeng Puachue Hmong ===
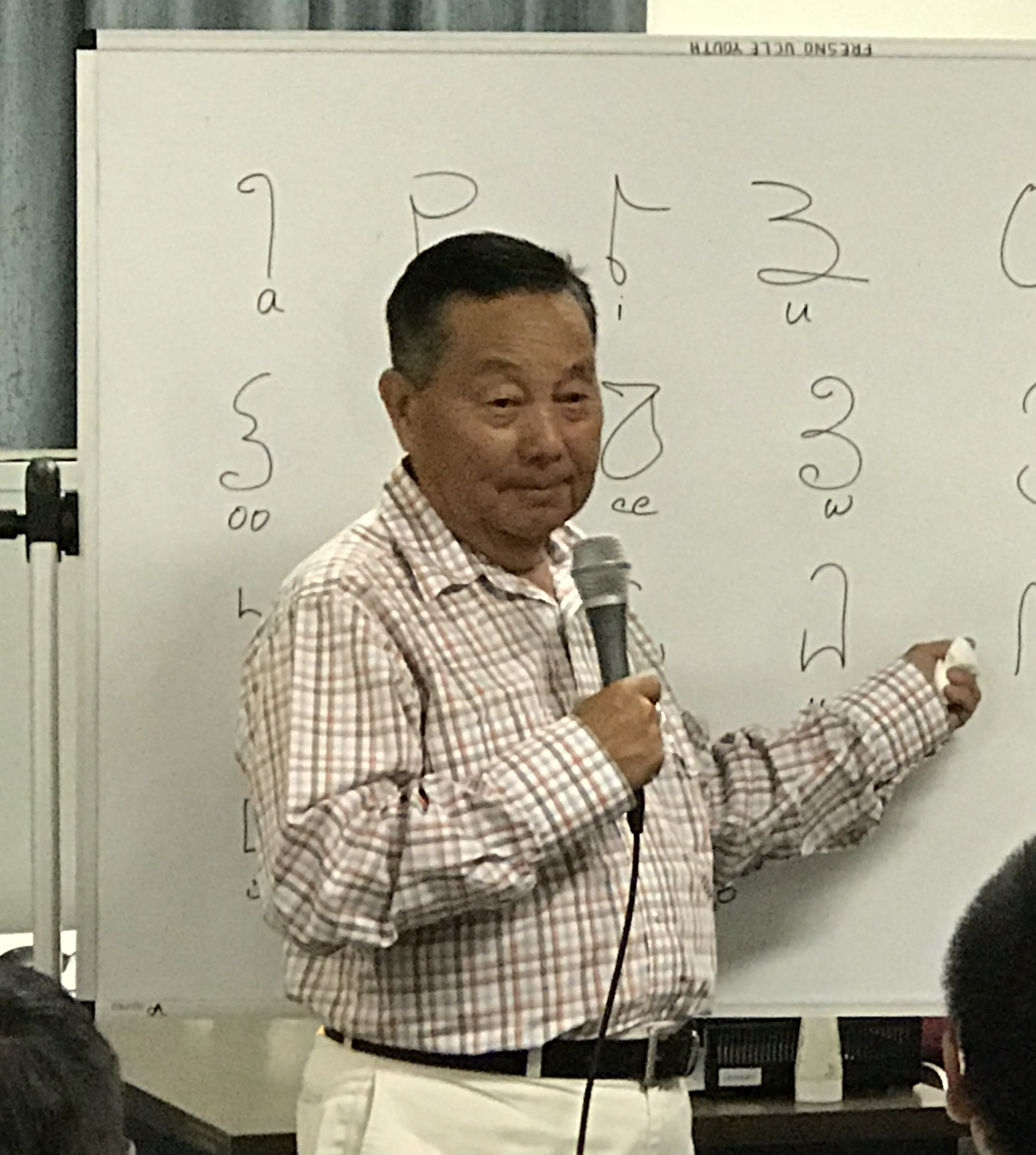
Chervang Kong Vang teaching Nyiakeng Puachue in 2017

Nyiakeng Puachue Hmong script was used in the 1980s by United Christians Liberty Evangelical Church, a church founded by Reverend Chervang Kong Vang, which moved around California, Minnesota, Wisconsin, North Carolina, Colorado, and many other states. Initially, it was not as widely accepted outside of the members of the church. The script seems to bear strong resemblance to the Lao alphabet in structure and form and characters inspired from the Hebrew alphabets, although the characters themselves are different. The Unicode proposal for this script uses the name 'Nyiakeng Puachue Hmong script'. This script has been used by members of the United Christians Liberty Evangelical church in America for more than 25 years, in printed material and videos. It is reported to have some use in Laos, Thailand, Vietnam, France, and Australia. On March 5, 2019, Nyiakeng Puachue Hmong Script was officially published into the Unicode Standard version 12.0 with a total of 71 characters in the Nyiakeng Puachue Hmong Unicode block.

== Historically used scripts ==
=== Sayaboury script ===
This is an alphabet that was used, at the very least, by Hmong residents of Sainyabuli Province (the script's namesake) in Laos, who came to a UN Refugee Camp in Chiang Kham, Thailand, as a result of the Vietnam War. It is called by anthropologists as "Ntawv Puaj Txwm"., which means "original writing". Nine volumes of texts reported to be 700–800 years old were handed over by Ga Va Her to Nina Wimuttikosol, an officer that Her had befriended while in the camp. Allegedly, these writings had been revealed by the Hmong deity La Bi Mi Nu, and the information in these manuscripts was then transcribed. Wimuttikosol gave it to Jacques Lemoine, a known French anthropologist in the field. It has a set of unusual features, which if discovered to be original, could dramatically alter the field of Hmong research. It is not known how much further research is currently being undertaken. The preliminary Unicode proposal for this script uses the name 'Eebee Hmong script'. It is used to write the Hmong Daw (White Hmong) dialect that is commonly spoken in Laos and in the United States.

=== Pa Chai script ===
Pa Chai was a leader of the Hmong in the early twentieth century. He was seen as the "Chao Fa" of the Hmong people before Shong Lue Yang, although his power was not as far-reaching. He was a leader in the movement against the French colonial empire, and one day, he was taken to the "Lord of the Sky and the Earth", known in Hmong as Lub Ntuj Lub Teb. He received a mandate to lead the Hmong people to change their way of life and develop a new writing system, and it is said that after he returned, he displayed magical powers. These manifested in the form of two years of successful resistance against the French. Apparently, although Pa Chai had instructed his people not to attack the Lao, they did, and this caused him to lose his supposed mandate, which caused the Hmong to begin losing, and in due course, in 1921, he was killed, ending the "War of the Insane", as it was known to the French. As Shong Lue was the next "Chao Fa", this alleged militant intention constantly hung over Shong Lue's head, which contributed to the acceleration of Shong Lue's defamation, mystery, and assassination. Pa Chai's script has reasonable success, with villagers reporting that they had seen Pa Chai's script, encoded laws, and writing methods during the French colonial rule. It is unknown what has survived.

=== Ntawv Savina (Hmong Vietnamese) ===
This was a French version of the Hmong alphabet developed by Father Savina during French colonization of Indochina. Rather than resembling Ntour Hmongz (Hmong Vietnamese) or Ntawv Hmoob (RPA), it uses tone symbols, like Quốc ngữ writing used for Vietnamese today. It may have been in use before independence, but its use since has waned. Hmong people living in Vietnam may be using a form of this inadvertently in writing Hmong based on Vietnamese.

=== Homer-Dixon Romanized Alphabet (Hmong Vietnamese) ===
This alphabet, published in 1939 by missionary Homera Homer-Dixon for the Hmong Leng, was never particularly popular, but was similar to Savina's romanization in many respects. The main differences involve the closer use of Quốc ngữ writing, with an analogous convention of indicating tones with diacritics, as opposed to using tone letters, as in RPA systems. This script remains unused.

=== Ntơưr Hmôngz (Hmong Vietnamese RPA) ===
This was a Romanized style of writing Hmongic languages in Vietnam. It bears resemblance to the Quốc ngữ writing used for Vietnamese today, but uses the tone letters, in similarity to RPA. This Vietnamese RPA script is only known to a few in Vietnam, predominantly of Christian faith, and it is thought that it will not be in use for much longer.

=== Hmong Lao scripts ===
This refers to the set of Hmong scripts that are based on the Lao alphabet, primarily used for transcribing the Green and White varieties of Hmong. Two versions are thought to have been initially developed. The first version was developed by Lor Fong, the brother of Hmong leader Fai Dang Lor, in 1948. After a meeting held by General Vang Pao at Long Tieng in 1964, a revised version was developed by Christian missionaries. It was used extensively in Laos before the communist takeover; however, its influence and use has waned. Apparently, people who are literate in Lao will not find too much trouble in reading and writing the script.

It is known that there was a distinct Hmong Lao script supported by the Kingdom of Laos, and one supported by the Pathet Lao communists. The connection between the Pathet Lao-supported script and the script designed by Lor Fong, is not very clear, however. Since Fai Dang Lor is a known communist supporter, and since Vang Pao is a known supporter of the Royal Lao government, the selection and revision of the Hmong Lao script described in the previous paragraph is unclear in allegiance. If the Lor Fong script is indeed the Pathet Lao-supported script, there may only be one or two scripts that were created. If the Lor Fong script is the royalist-accepted script, then there may have been up to three Hmong Lao scripts created. Yet, as the Pathet Lao has been accused of widespread genocide of the Hmong people in coordination with the North Vietnamese armies, the Hmong Lao script remains widely unaccepted. Nonetheless, the contemporary system of transcribing Hmong in Lao may inadvertently still use a form of this script.

=== Whitelock systems (Hmong Lao/Thai) ===
This represents two scripts designed by Doris Whitelock, a missionary in the area during the 1960s and 1970s. She first developed a Thai-based system for writing Hmong in the 1960s. However, the Thai system was never widely used, even though Hmong people may be unconsciously be using a similar system in Thailand today. In the 1970s she developed a Lao-based system; however, this became the subject of widespread criticism, as it was considered a "Lao counterfeit", and so was not adopted by the Hmong people of Laos. While neither system became popular, both are still used to an extent by missionaries working in Thailand and Laos, and people who can read the scripts may still exist.

=== Trung Script (Hmong Thai) ===
This system was published in 1932 by a Vietnamese missionary, C. K. Trung. The system uses Thai characters but reorients the system to fit the Hmong Leng language more closely. The system reportedly never gained much of a following.

=== Miao in Chinese Characters (Hmong Chinese) ===
In 1912, in Sichuan, a French officer named d'Ollone is said to have discovered some members of the Miao people reading and writing using Chinese characters, but they were allegedly very secretive about this script's existence and many members of the community vehemently denied it.

== Working experimental scripts ==
A vast majority of experimental scripts are based in the United States of America, specifically in the Midwest, where there is a relatively large population of Hmong refugees, primarily from Laos and Vietnam.

=== Ntaw Cher Ze ===
This was developed by Cher Ze Xiong, who died in May 2013 in Chicago. He allegedly developed the script in the 1950s while still in Laos. His script is distinct in that he uses left radicals, as in Chinese, to indicate the meaning of the words, with right radicals, or syllables, to indicate the pronunciation. In this way, it represents a fusion of Chinese and Pallava-based alphasyllabaries. It is not known if anyone else could read the script.

=== New Mong ===
This script was developed by Ian James for writing Hmong Daw and Hmong Njua. It is based on Pallava script, from which a vast majority of scripts in Southeast Asia descend. He reportedly intended to represent what Hmong 'would have looked like' had Hmong followed the same evolutionary descent from Pallava.

=== Ntaw Nee Hmoo ===
This script was developed by Tchuyi Vang in St. Paul, Minnesota, in the 1990s. It is called Ntawv Neej Hmoob, or "Hmong Life Script" by the author. It allegedly includes influences of the Chinese language.

== Unclassified scripts ==
=== Qauv Ntaub Qauv Ntawv ===
This script has appeared over the Internet as the "Ancient Hmong Written Language" and is allegedly the reading guide to the Pa Ntau flower cloths referenced historically. It is, however, only being promoted in America, and based on Internet testimony, there seems to be Hmong schools in the United States who teach it in official settings, and Hmong women who teach it to their children. Whether or not this transcription does represent the true transcription of the flower cloth is currently unverified by reliable, neutral sources.

=== Ntawv Hmoob 92 ===
This script supposedly contains consonants and vowels in the form of clan names, but this script has not properly been attributed in languages other than RPA Hmong, so international information is scarce. This script, however, is established enough to have a keyboard. Use of the keyboard is unknown. Additionally, its relationship to the purported Flower Cloth script mentioned above needs to be explored in greater depth, as the forms and strokes of characters in the two scripts bear some resemblance.

== Correspondence between orthographies ==
The following is a list of pairs of RPA and Dananshan pinyin segments having the same sound (or very similar sounds). Note however that RPA and the standard in China not only differ in orthographic rules, but are also used to write different languages. The list is ordered alphabetically by the RPA, apart from prenasalized stops and voiceless sonorants, which come after their oral and voiced homologues. There are three overriding patterns to the correspondences: RPA doubles a vowel for nasalization, whereas pinyin uses ⟨ng⟩; RPA uses ⟨h⟩ for aspiration, whereas pinyin uses the voicing distinction of the Latin script; pinyin uses ⟨h⟩ (and ⟨r⟩) to derive the retroflex and uvular series from the dental and velar, whereas RPA uses sequences based on ⟨t, x, k⟩ vs. ⟨r, s, q⟩ for the same.

Vowels
RPA	Pinyin	Vietnamese	Pahawh
a			𖬖, 𖬗
aa	ang		𖬚, 𖬛
ai			𖬊, 𖬋
au		âu	𖬄, 𖬅
aw	–	ơư	𖬎, 𖬏
e		ê	𖬈, 𖬉
ee	eng	ênh	𖬀, 𖬁
–	eu	–	–
i			𖬂, 𖬃
ia	–	iê	𖬔, 𖬕
o			𖬒, 𖬓
oo	ong	ông	𖬌, 𖬍
–	ou	–	–
u		u	𖬆, 𖬇
ua		uô	𖬐, 𖬑
w	i	ư	𖬘, 𖬙

Consonants
RPA	Dananshan	Vietnamese	Pahawh
c	j	ch	𖬯
ch	q		𖬧
nc	nj	nd	𖬤𖬰
nch	nq		𖬨
d	–	đ	𖬞𖬰
dh	–	đh	𖬞𖬵
dl		đr	𖬭
dlh	tl	đl	𖬭𖬴
ndl	–	nđr	𖬭𖬰
ndlh	–	nđl	𖬭𖬵
f		ph	𖬜𖬵
h			𖬟
k	g	c	–
kh	k	kh	𖬩𖬰
nk	ng	g	𖬢
nkh	nk	nkh	𖬫𖬵
l			𖬞
hl			𖬥
m			𖬦
hm			𖬣𖬵
ml	–	mn	𖬠
hml	–	hmn	𖬠𖬰
n			𖬬
hn		hn	𖬩
–	ngg	–	–
ny	ni	nh	𖬮𖬵
hny	hni	hnh	𖬣𖬰
p	b	p	𖬪𖬵
ph	p	ph	𖬝𖬵
np	nb	b	𖬨𖬵
nph	np	mf	𖬡𖬰
pl	bl	pl	𖬟𖬵
plh	pl	fl	𖬪
npl	nbl	bl	𖬫𖬰
nplh	npl	mfl	𖬡𖬵
q	gh	k	𖬦𖬵
qh	kh	qh	𖬣
nq	ngh	ng	𖬬𖬰
nqh	nkh	nkr	𖬬𖬵
r	dr	tr	𖬡
rh	tr	rh	𖬢𖬵
nr	ndr	r	𖬜𖬰
nrh	ntr	nr	𖬨𖬰
s	sh	s	𖬤𖬵
t	d	t	𖬧𖬵
th	t	th	𖬟𖬰
nt	nd	nt	𖬩𖬵
nth	nt	nth	𖬫
ts	zh	ts	𖬝𖬰
tsh	ch	tsh	𖬪𖬰
nts	nzh	nts	𖬝
ntsh	nch	ntsh	𖬯𖬰
tx	z	tx	𖬯𖬵
txh	c	cx	𖬦𖬰
ntx	nz	nz	𖬢𖬰
ntxh	nc	nx	𖬥𖬵
v			𖬜
–	w	–	–
x	s	x	𖬮
xy	x	sh	𖬧𖬰
y		z	𖬤
z	r	j	𖬥𖬰

There is no simple correspondence between the tone letters. The historical connection between the tones is as follows. The Chinese names reflect the tones given to early Chinese loan words with those tones in Chinese.

Tone class	Tone number	Dananshan orthog.	RPA		Vietnamese Hmong
Tone class	Tone number	Dananshan orthog.	Hmoob	Moob	Vietnamese Hmong
平 or A	1	b ˦˧	b ˥		z
平 or A	2	x ˧˩	j ˥˧		x
上 or B	3	d ˥	v ˧˦		r
上 or B	4	l ˨˩̤	s	g	s
去 or C	5	t ˦	(unmarked) ˧		
去 or C	6	s ˩˧̤	g ˧˩̤		l
入 or D	7	k ˧	s ˩		s
入 or D	8	f ˨˦	m ˩̰ ~ d ˨˩˧		v ~ k

Tones 4 and 7 merged in Hmoob Dawb, whereas tones 4 and 6 merged in Mong Leeg.

Example: lus Hmoob /̤ lṳ˧˩ m̥̥õ˦ / 𞄉𞄧𞄴𞄀𞄄𞄰𞄩 / (White Hmong) / lug Moob / 𞄉𞄧𞄵𞄀𞄩𞄰 / (Mong Leng) / lol Hmongb (Dananshan) / lus Hmôngz (Vietnamese) "Hmong language".

== See also ==
- Hmongic languages
- Hmong language
- Hmong people
