= Pa Kao Her =

Hmong politician (died 2002)

Paj Kaub Hawj
- 𖬖𖬰𖬪𖬵 𖬄𖬰 𖬎𖬲𖬟
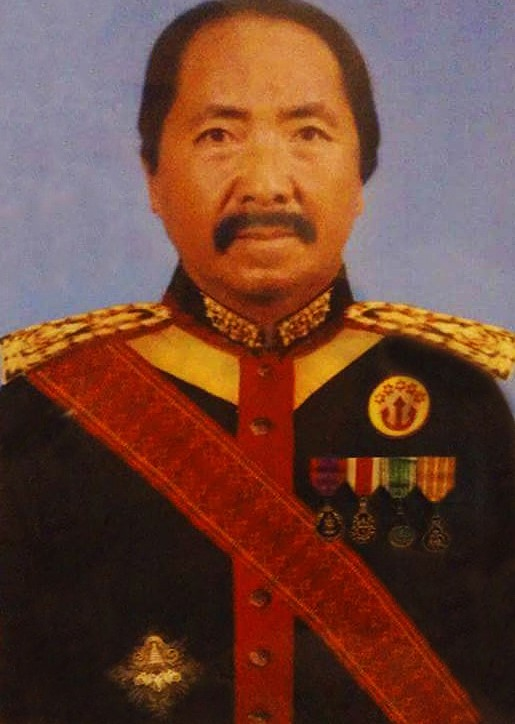
- Pronunciation: [pâ káu hâɨ]
- Born: Nong Het District, Xieng Khouang Province, northern Laos
- Died: 2002; Chiang Rai Province, Thailand
- Known for: An earlier leader, after Zong Zoua Her, of the anti-Lao government

Pa Kao Her (RPA: Paj Kaub Hawj [pâ káu hâɨ], Pahawh: 𖬖𖬰𖬪𖬵 𖬄𖬰 𖬎𖬲𖬟 [pâ káu hâɨ]) was an ethnic Hmong born in Nong Het District, Xieng Khouang Province, northern Laos, near the border with Vietnam. He was one of the first followers of his cousin, Shong Lue Yang, also known as the "Mother of Writing", who developed the Pahawh script. Later, he was one of the leaders of the Hmong ChaoFa movement in Laos, along with Zong Zoua Her, after the communist Lao People's Revolutionary Party took power in 1975. He was President of the Ethnic Liberation Organization of Laos (ELOL), an anti-Lao PDR government organization based in Thailand, with a presence in Laos, in the 1980s. Later, he became president of the ChaoFa Democratic Party.

The ChaoFa movement split into a number of groups in the 1990s and 2000s. Pa Kao Her was head of the main faction. Moua Nhia Long was the leader of another faction.

Pa Kao Her was assassinated in 2002 in Chiang Rai Province, Thailand shortly after his visitation to America. His assassination was allegedly ordered by General Vang Pao who was afraid his leadership would be succeeded by Pa Kao Her due to his increase of popularity among the West and the Hmong community.

The Hmong ChaoFa, a splinter organization, has been admitted into the Unrepresented Nations and Peoples Organization. It is developing what it calls the Hmong ChaoFa Federation State and the World Hmong People's Congress website.
