= Hmong calendar =

Calendar of the Hmong people

The Hmong calendar (Pahawh: 𖬌𖬣𖬵 𖬊𖬞𖬰 𖬀𖬰𖬧𖬵 𖬂𖬯 𖬘𖬲𖬥𖬰; RPA: Hmoob daim teej cim zwj) is a lunar calendar used by the Hmong people, based on the traditional Chinese calendar. According to Hmong legends and folklore, the calendar has been in use since ancient times, although its exact origins remain unknown.

== System ==
The Hmong lunar calendar operates using a system of revolving cycles of days (Pahawh: 𖬆𖬰𖬩; RPA: hnub), weeks (Pahawh: 𖬑𖬟𖬵; RPA: plua), months (Pahawh: 𖬃𖬥; RPA: hli), and years (Pahawh: 𖬍𖬧𖬰; RPA: xyoo). This system incorporates both moon cycles and the Hmong zodiac; the latter is based on the Chinese zodiac.

=== Day ===
A day (𖬆𖬰𖬩 / 𖬆𖬰𖬬; hnub / nub) is considered both traditionally and currently to be the time from one midnight to the next. While the Hmong people reckoned a day by hours, the concept of fixed hours does not seem to exist, nor do they follow the traditional Chinese timekeeping system; instead, they rely on generic terms to describe broad descriptors of time, such as sawv ntxov for morning (which can range from 03:00 to 11:59), tav su for afternoon (13:00 to 16:00), and ib tag hmo for midnight (00:00).

=== Day of the week ===
Gregorian Days	Hmong RPA	Hmong Days	Informal (in RPA)
Sunday	Zwj hnub	𖬘𖬲𖬥𖬰 𖬆𖬰𖬩	Hnub ib
Monday	Zwj hli	𖬘𖬲𖬥𖬰 𖬃𖬥	Hnub ob
Tuesday	Zwj quag	𖬘𖬲𖬥𖬰 𖬑𖬶𖬦𖬵	Hnub peb
Wednesday	Zwj feeb	𖬘𖬲𖬥𖬰 𖬀𖬶𖬜𖬵	Hnub plaub
Thursday	Zwj teeb	𖬘𖬲𖬥𖬰 𖬀𖬶𖬧𖬵	Hnub tsib
Friday	Zwj kuab	𖬘𖬲𖬥𖬰 𖬐𖬶	Hnub rau
Saturday	Zwj cag	𖬘𖬲𖬥𖬰 𖬗𖬶𖬯	Hnub xya

=== Months ===
A month (𖬃𖬥; hli) is considered both traditionally and currently to be the time from one new moon to the next. In the Hmong calendar, each month last for around 30 days. Odd-numbered months that starts with the day of the Snake and ends with the day of the Rabbit, are called hli khib (𖬃𖬥 𖬂𖬲𖬩𖬰), while even-numbered months that starts with the day of the pig and ends with the day of the Dragon, are called hli khub (𖬃𖬥 𖬆𖬰𖬩𖬰).

Month Number	Starts on Gregorian date *	Formal, Hmong RPA	Pahawh Hmong	Gregorian Months	Informal, Hmong RPA
12	between 21 January – 20 February	Tsov hli / tsuv hli	𖬒𖬶𖬝𖬰 𖬃𖬥 / 𖬆𖬲𖬝𖬰 𖬃𖬥	January	Ib hlis
1	between 20 February – 21 March	Luav hli	𖬐𖬲𖬞 𖬃𖬥	February	Ob hlis
2	between 21 March – 20 April	Zaj hli / zaaj hli	𖬖𖬰𖬥𖬰 𖬃𖬥	March	Peb hlis
3	between 20 April – 21 May	Nas hli / naas hli	𖬗𖬲𖬬 𖬃𖬥	April	Plaub hlis
4	between 21 May – 21 June	Neeg hli	𖬁𖬲𖬬 𖬃𖬥	May	Tsib hlis
5	between 21 June – 23 July	Yaj hli / yaaj hli	𖬖𖬰𖬤 𖬃𖬥	June	Rau hlis
6	between 23 July – 23 August	Dev hli / dlev hli	𖬉𖬞𖬰 𖬃𖬥	July	Xya hlis
7	between 23 August – 23 September	Qais hli / qa hli	𖬋𖬰𖬦𖬵 𖬃𖬥 / 𖬗𖬰𖬦𖬵 𖬃𖬥	August	Yim hlis
8	between 23 September – 23 October	Liab hli / lab hli	𖬔𖬞 𖬃𖬥	September	Cuaj hlis
9	between 23 October – 22 November	Npua hli	𖬑𖬨𖬵 𖬃𖬥	October	Kaum hlis
10	between 22 November – 22 December	Nas hli / naag hli	𖬗𖬲𖬬 𖬃𖬥	November	Kaum ib hlis
11	between 22 December – 21 January	Nyuj hli	𖬆𖬶𖬮𖬵 𖬃𖬥	December	Kaum ob hlis

*Gregorian dates are approximate and should be used with caution. Many years have intercalary months.

Gregorian names for months cannot be used for name-equivalent months in the Hmong calendar, but informal Hmong months can be used for name-equivalent months in the Gregorian names; for example, Hmong New Year, which traditionally falls on the 30th day of the twelve lunar month in the Hmong calendar, cannot be written as 30th December.

=== Year ===
A year (𖬍𖬧𖬰; xyoo) is based upon the time of one revolution of Earth around the Sun, rounded to whole days. Traditionally, a year starts around the first month of the lunar calendar (typically the month of the Rabbit).

Much like the traditional Chinese calendar, a 12-month-year using this system can last an average of about 354 days, which would drift significantly from the tropical year. To fix this, one full extra month is added in approximately every three years, making a 13-month leap year. Based on traditional Hmong farming almanacs (Pahawh: 𖬌𖬣𖬵 𖬒𖬶𖬯 𖬌𖬦𖬵 𖬍𖬰𖬞; RPA: Hmoob cov qoob loo), the leap year is specifically considered to have one month repeated twice (Pahawh: 𖬐𖬰𖬦 𖭒 𖬆𖬰𖬞 𖬂𖬤 𖬃𖬥; RPA: muaj 2 lub yim hli), usually the eighth month of the lunar calendar.

=== Seasons ===
English	Hmong RPA	Pahawh Hmong
Spring	Caij nplooj xyoob nplooj ntoos hlav	𖬊𖬶𖬯 𖬌𖬲𖬫𖬰 𖬌𖬧𖬰 𖬌𖬲𖬫𖬰 𖬍𖬲𖬩𖬵 𖬗𖬥
Summer	Caij ntuj sov	𖬊𖬶𖬯 𖬆𖬶𖬩𖬵 𖬒𖬶𖬤𖬵
Autumn/Fall	Caij nplooj xyoob nplooj ntoos zeeg	𖬊𖬶𖬯 𖬌𖬲𖬫𖬰 𖬌𖬧𖬰 𖬌𖬲𖬫𖬰 𖬍𖬲𖬩𖬵 𖬁𖬲𖬥𖬰
Winter	Caij ntuj no	𖬊𖬶𖬯 𖬆𖬶𖬩𖬵 𖬓𖬰𖬬

== Moon cycle counting system ==
The Hmong lunar calendar divides the month into three main moon cycles:

1. Waxing Crescent (𖬃𖬥 𖬔𖬮, Hli xiab), occurring during the first 14 days of the month and corresponding to the moon's progression toward the full moon, including the first half moon phase.
2. Full Moon (𖬃𖬥 𖬗𖬰𖬝, Hli ntsa): This cycle occurs specifically on the 15th day of the month, which is the full moon phase.
3. Waning Gibbous (𖬃𖬥 𖬃𖬲𖬬𖬰, Hli nqig): This cycle spans the last 14 days of the month, during which the moon wanes, including the second half moon phase.

Following the waning gibbous, the entire cycle repeats, mirroring the structure of other East Asian, Southeast Asian, and international moon cycles.

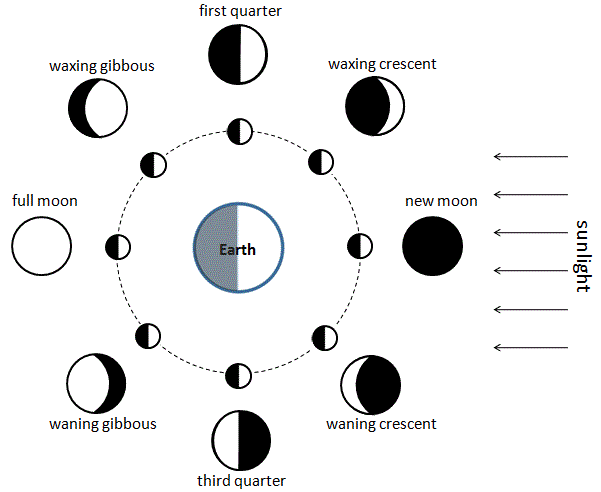

=== Moon counting system ===
International moon cycles	Hmong moon cycles	Day(s) counted
Waxing moon	Pahawh: 𖬃𖬥 𖬔𖬮 / 𖬃𖬥 𖬖𖬲𖬮; RPA: Hli xiab / hli xab	1st to 7th day
First quarter (half moon)	Pahawh: 𖬃𖬥 𖬔𖬮 / 𖬃𖬥 𖬖𖬲𖬮; RPA: Hli xiab / hli xab	8th to 14th day
Full moon	Pahawh: 𖬃𖬥 𖬗𖬰𖬜𖬰 / 𖬃𖬥 𖬛𖬰𖬜𖬰; RPA: Hli nra / hli nraa	15th day
Waning moon	Pahawh: 𖬃𖬥 𖬉𖬶𖬬𖬰; RPA: Hli nqeg	16th to 21st day
Third quarter (half moon)	Pahawh: 𖬃𖬥 𖬉𖬶𖬬𖬰; RPA: Hli nqeg	22nd to 28th day
New moon	Pahawh: 𖬃𖬥 𖬑𖬶𖬧𖬵 / 𖬃𖬥 𖬛𖬶𖬧𖬵; RPA: Hli tuag / taag	30th day

== Hmong zodiac ==
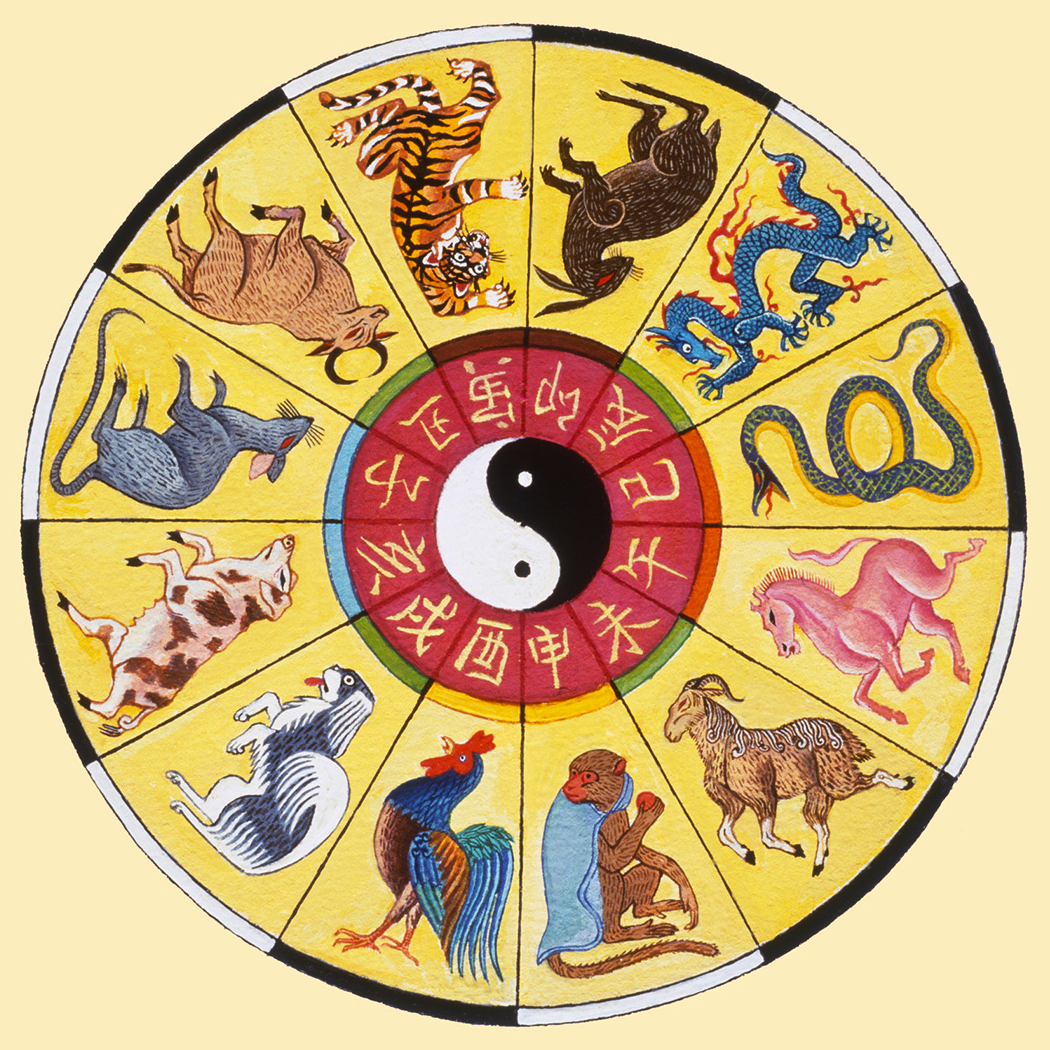

According to Hmong folklore, a long time ago, the almighty god (Pahawh: 𖬏𖬲𖬤 𖬄𖬤𖬵; RPA: Yawg Saum) decided to select animals to represent each Lunar Year. To ensure fairness between species, as the incident involved both heaven and the underworld, he chose an equal number of domestic and wild animals. This resulted in a total of 12 zodiac animals (Pahawh: 𖭑𖭒 (𖬄 𖬒𖬰𖬮𖬰) 𖬇𖬲𖬧𖬵 𖬔𖬶𖬝𖬰; RPA: 12 (kaum-ob) tus tsiaj) to represent each Lunar New Year.

It should be note that while Hmong reckoning of years starts with the year of the Rat, as is traditionally done with the Chinese zodiacs, the Hmong reckoning of months starts with the month of the Rabbit instead of the month of the Tiger.

The 12 animals are as follows:

- Rat (Pahawh: 𖬗𖬲𖬬 / 𖬛𖬲𖬬; RPA: Nas/ Naas)
- Cow (Pahawh: 𖬆𖬶𖬮𖬵; RPA: Nyuj)
- Tiger (Pahawh: 𖬒𖬶𖬝𖬰 / 𖬆𖬲𖬝𖬰; RPA: Tsov / Tsuv)
- Rabbit (Pahawh: 𖬐𖬲𖬞; RPA: Luav)
- Dragon (Pahawh: 𖬖𖬰𖬥𖬰 / 𖬚𖬰𖬥𖬰; RPA: Zaj / Zaaj)
- Snake (Pahawh: 𖬖𖬲𖬬 / 𖬚𖬲𖬬; RPA: Nab / Naab)
- Horse (Pahawh: 𖬁𖬰𖬬; RPA: Nees)
- Goat (Pahawh: 𖬃𖬰𖬪𖬰; RPA: Tshis)
- Monkey (Pahawh: 𖬔𖬞 / 𖬖𖬲𖬞; RPA: Liab / Lab)
- Rooster (Pahawh: 𖬊𖬰𖬦𖬵 / 𖬖𖬲𖬦𖬵; RPA: Qaib / Qab)
- Dog (Pahawh: 𖬉𖬞𖬰 / 𖬉𖬭𖬰; RPA: Dev / Dlev)
- Pig (Pahawh: 𖬑𖬨𖬵; RPA: Npua)
