= William A. Smalley =

American linguist (1923–1997)

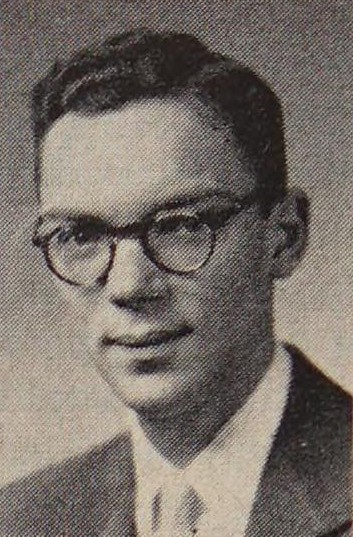
- Smalley, c. 1956
- Born: William Allen Smalley; April 4, 1923; Jerusalem, British Mandate of Palestine
- Died: December 16, 1997 (aged 74); New Haven, Connecticut, U.S.
- Citizenship: United States
- Spouse: Jane Smalley
- Children: 3

Academic background
- Education: Houghton College (BA); Columbia University (PhD)
- Thesis: Outline of Khmu Structure (1956)

Academic work
- Discipline: Linguist
- Institutions: United Bible Societies (1954–77); Bethel University (1978–87)
- Main interests: Khmu language; Hmong language; Pahawh Hmong; Languages of Thailand
- Notable ideas: Romanized Popular Alphabet

William Allen Smalley (April 4, 1923 – December 16, 1997) was an American linguist. He is best known for his role in the development of the Romanized Popular Alphabet for the Hmong language.

== Life ==
=== Early life ===
Smalley was born on April 4, 1923, in Jerusalem, which was then part of the British Mandate of Palestine. His parents were American missionaries who worked among Arabs in Jerusalem and Transjordan for the Christian and Missionary Alliance. The family returned to the United States in 1934.

From 1941, Smalley attended Houghton College, where he developed an interest in anthropology, which he saw as relevant to missionary work. After graduating from Houghton in 1945 with a degree in English literature, he attended the Missionary Training Institute (1945–46) and received linguistic training in Bible translation at the Summer Institute of Linguistics at the University of Oklahoma (1946, 1947). In 1946, he also enrolled in Columbia University's graduate program in anthropology with a concentration in linguistics.

=== Vietnam and Laos ===
In 1950, the Christian and Missionary Alliance sent him to the southern region of Vietnam, where he worked on problems of language analysis. The following year, he was sent to Luang Prabang in Laos in order to analyse Khmu and prepare lessons in the language for other missionaries.

In Laos, he met Reverend G. Linwood Barney and Father Yves Bertrais, and together they began working on a writing system for the Hmong language, which had until then been unwritten. The system they developed became known as the Romanized Popular Alphabet, and it is today the most widely used Hmong writing system. Yang Dao, the assistant director of the English Language Learner Project of the St. Paul Public Schools, has said: "I cannot value his work. … It is invaluable. This writing system helped us to preserve our culture and tradition and history. Now it is used by Hmong all over the world."

In 1954, the outbreak of the Laotian Civil War forced him and his wife, Jane, to return to the United States. There he completed his dissertation on the Khmu language, for which he was awarded a doctorate by Columbia in 1956. An abbreviated version of his dissertation was published by the American Oriental Society in 1961.

=== United Bible Societies ===
From 1954 onwards, he worked primarily in Southeast Asia as a translation consultant and coordinator for the American Bible Society and its parent organization, United Bible Societies. The nature of his work meant that he twice took up residence in Thailand, first from 1962 to 1967 and then again from 1969 to 1972.

He was the editor of Practical Anthropology (now known as Missiology) from 1955 to 1968 and an associate editor of The Bible Translator from 1957 to 1959.

In 1977, after twenty-three years with the American Bible Society and United Bible Societies, he decided to leave. Unable to find employment, he worked for a time at a discount toy store.

=== Bethel University ===
In 1978, he relocated to St. Paul, Minnesota, to accept a position as Professor of Linguistics at Bethel University. To his surprise, he discovered that many thousands of Hmong refugees were also settling in the Minneapolis–Saint Paul area.

As an Honorary Fellow with the University of Minnesota Southeast Asia Refugee Studies Program, he took part in a project studying Hmong adaptation to life in the United States, publishing 'Adaptive Language Strategies of the Hmong: From Asian Mountains to American Ghettos' (1985) and 'Stages of Hmong Cultural Adaptation' (1986).

He also studied the different Hmong scripts that had been developed after the Romanized Popular Alphabet, in particular the Pahawh Hmong script, which was created in Laos in 1959 by Shong Lue Yang. With Chia Koua Vang and Gnia Yee Yang, he wrote two books about Pahawh Hmong and its creator: Mother of Writing: The Origin and Development of a Hmong Messianic Script and The Life of Shong Lue Yang: Hmong “Mother of Writing” (both published in 1990).

From 1983 to 1992, he was an associate editor of Language Sciences.

In 1985 and 1986, he once again lived in Thailand, this time as a Fulbright research fellow researching the different languages and dialects of the country. His book Linguistic Diversity and National Unity: Language Ecology in Thailand (1994) was described by David A. Smyth as "a masterful study of the relationship between the national language, regional dialects and minority languages".

He retired from Bethel University in 1987, but continued to write extensively in his retirement.

He died of a heart attack at the Hospital of Saint Raphael, New Haven, Connecticut, on December 16, 1997, at the age of seventy-four. He was survived by his wife, two sons, and one daughter.

== Notable works ==
=== Books ===
- Nida, Eugene A., and William A. Smalley (1959). Introducing Animism. New York: Friendship Press.
- Smalley, William A. (1961). Outline of Khmuʔ Structure. New Haven, Connecticut: American Oriental Society.
- Smalley, William A. (1961). Manual of Articulatory Phonetics. Tarrytown, New York: Practical Anthropology.
- Larson, Donald N., and William A. Smalley (1972). Becoming Bilingual: A Guide to Language Learning. New Canaan, Connecticut: Practical Anthropology.
- Smalley, William A., Chia Koua Vang, and Gnia Yee Yang (1990). Mother of Writing: The Origin and Development of a Hmong Messianic Script. Chicago: University of Chicago Press.
- Smalley, William A., Chia Koua Vang, and Gnia Yee Yang (1990). The Life of Shong Lue Yang: Hmong "Mother of Writing". Minneapolis: Center for Urban and Regional Affairs, University of Minnesota.
- Smalley, William A. (1991). Translation as Mission: Bible Translation in the Modern Missionary Movement. Macon, Georgia: Mercer University Press.
- Smalley, William A. (1994). Linguistic Diversity and National Unity: Language Ecology in Thailand. Chicago: University of Chicago Press.

=== Journal articles ===
- Osborn, Henry, and William A. Smalley (1949). 'Formulae for Comanche Stem and Word Formation'. International Journal of American Linguistics, Vol. 15, No. 2, pp. 93–99.
- Smalley, William A. (1958). 'The Cultures of Man and the Communication of the Gospel. Journal of the American Scientific Affiliation, Vol. 10, No. 2, pp. 8–13.
- Smalley, William A. (1973). 'Bibliography of Khmuʔ'. Mon-Khmer Studies, Vol. 4, pp. 23–32.
- Smalley, William A. (1985). 'Adaptive Language Strategies of the Hmong: From Asian Mountains to American Ghettos'. Language Sciences, Vol. 7, No. 2, pp. 241–269.
- Smalley, William A. (1988). 'Thailand's Hierarchy of Multilingualism'. Language Sciences, Vol. 10, No. 2, pp. 245–261.
- Smalley, William A. (1988). 'Multilingualism in the Northern Khmer Population of Thailand'. Language Sciences, Vol. 10, No. 2, pp. 395–408.
- Smalley, William A. (1991). 'My Pilgrimage in Mission'. International Bulletin of Missionary Research, Vol. 15, No. 2, pp. 70–73.
- Smalley, William A., and Nina Wimuttikosol (1998). 'Another Hmong Messianic Script and Its Texts'. Written Language and Literacy, Vol. 1, No. 1, pp. 103–128.

=== Book chapters ===
- Smalley, William A., and Marie Fetzer (1950). 'A Christian View of Anthropology'. In F. Alton Everest (ed.), Modern Science and Christian Faith, pp. 98–195. Wheaton, Illinois: Van Kampen Press.
- Smalley, William A. (1986). 'Stages of Hmong Cultural Adaptation'. In Glenn L. Hendricks, Bruce T. Downing, and Amos S. Deinard (eds.), The Hmong in Transition, pp. 7–22. New York: Center for Migration Studies.
- Smalley, William A. (1997). 'Early Protestant Missionaries and the Development of Thailand’s Hierarchy of Multilingualism'. In Arthur S. Abramson (ed.), Southeast Asian Linguistics Studies in Honor of Vichin Panupong, pp. 237–252. Bangkok: Chulalongkorn University Press.

=== Edited works ===
- Smalley, William A. (ed.) (1961). Orthography Studies: Articles on New Writing Systems. London: United Bible Societies.
- Smalley, William A. (ed.) (1967). Readings in Missionary Anthropology. Tarrytown, New York: Practical Anthropology.
- Smalley, William A. (ed.) (1976). Phonemes and Orthography: Language Planning in Ten Minority Languages of Thailand. Canberra, Australia: Linguistic Circle of Canberra.
- Smalley, William A. (ed.) (1978). Readings in Missionary Anthropology II. Pasadena, California: William Carey Library.
