= School of Philosophy, Psychology and Language Sciences, University of Edinburgh =

University unit in Endinburgh, Scotland

School of Philosophy, Psychology and Language Sciences
- The Dugald Stewart Building, where the school is headed
- Established: 2002
- Parent institution: University of Edinburgh
- Head of School: Professor Willem Hollmann
- Academic staff: >130
- Students: >2,000

The School of Philosophy, Psychology and Language Sciences (PPLS) is a school within the College of Arts, Humanities, and Social Sciences at the University of Edinburgh in Scotland. The school is based mainly within the central campus, stretching across 40 George Square (Philosophy), 7 George Square (Psychology), and the Dugald Stewart Building (Cognitive Sciences, Language Sciences, and Student Services), though teaching often takes place outside these spaces.

In undergraduate courses, PPLS offers both joint honours and single honours degrees, consisting primarily of Scottish Masters (MA) – though a Bachelor's of Science (BSc) is available for Psychology students. Alongside this, the school offers a wide variety of postgraduate programmes too, both in taught and research forms.

== History ==
The school was formed in 2002 after the nine faculties were reorganised into three colleges.
