= Mikko Laitinen =

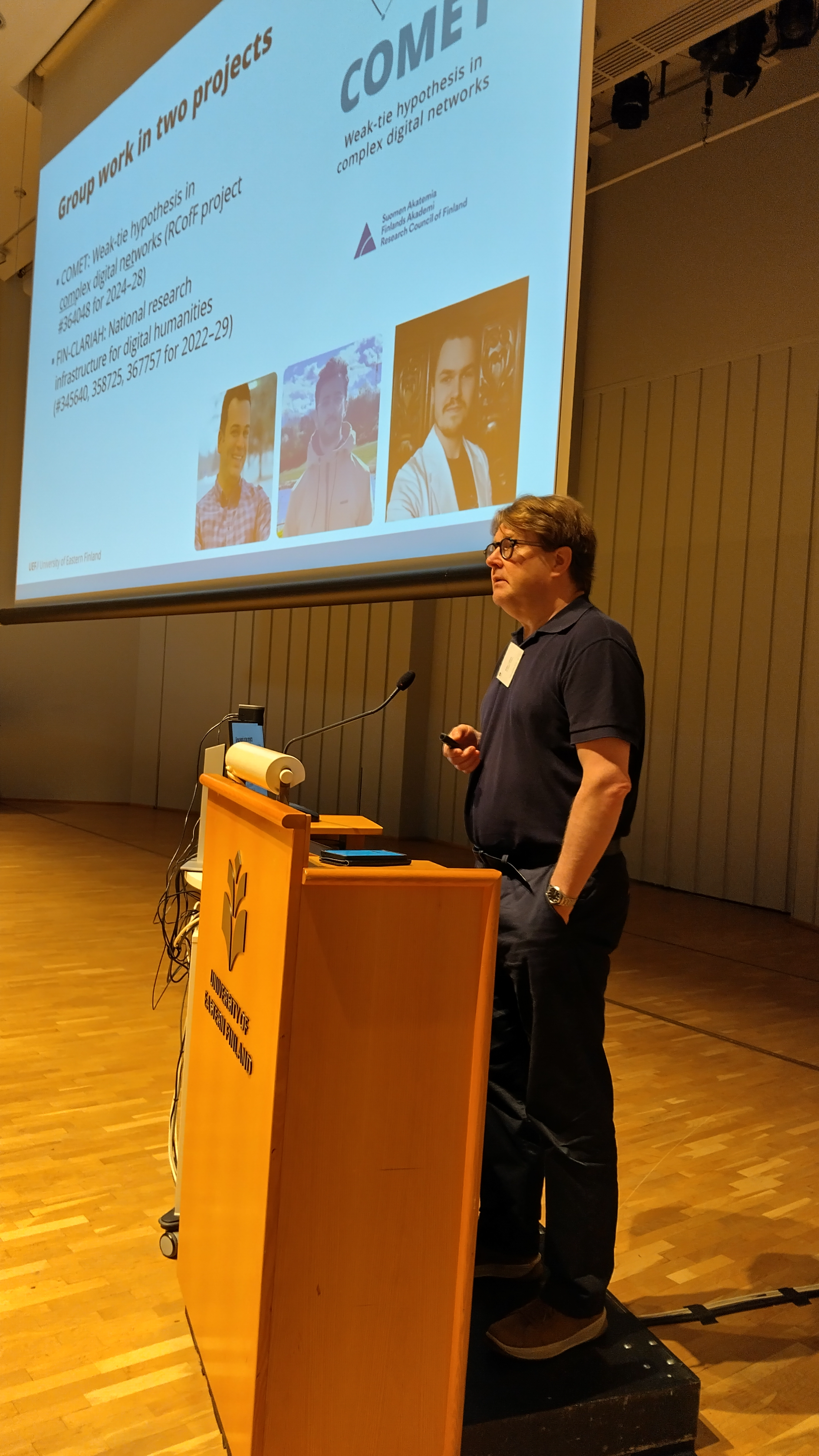
Mikko Laitinen giving a plenary talk at the Finnish Conference of Linguistics in 2026

Mikko Laitinen (born 1973) is a Finnish linguist and Professor of English Language and Culture at the University of Eastern Finland. Laitinen previously held positions at the University of Helsinki, the University of Jyväskylä, and Linnaeus University, where he was appointed Professor of English in 2012.

His research focuses on language variation and change in English, social network theory in sociolinguistics, and World Englishes in Finland and the Nordic countries. His work involves computational and data-intensive methods.

In 2022, Laitinen was elected a member of the Finnish Academy of Science and Letters.

With Martin Schweinberger, he is co-editor of the Bloomsbury Academic book series Language, Data Science and Digital Humanities, which focuses on interdisciplinary research on language, digitalisation, and computational methods in the humanities.

== Selected publications ==
- Laitinen, Mikko (2020). "Empirical perspectives on English as a lingua franca (ELF) grammar". World Englishes. 39 (3): 1–16.
- Laitinen, Mikko; Fatemi, Masoud; Lundberg, Jonas (2020). "Size matters: Digital social networks and language change". Frontiers in Artificial Intelligence. 3 (46).
- Lundberg, Jonas; Laitinen, Mikko (2020). "Twitter trolls: A linguistic profile of anti-democratic discourse". Language Sciences. 79.
- Laitinen, Mikko; Rautionaho, Paula, eds. (2025). Data-Intensive Investigations of English. Cambridge: Cambridge University Press.
