= Zero consonant =

Consonant letter that doesn't correspond to a consonant sound

In orthography, a zero consonant, silent initial, or null-onset letter is a consonant letter that does not correspond to a consonant sound, but is required when a word or syllable starts with a vowel (i.e. has a null onset). Some abjads, abugidas, and alphabets have zero consonants, generally because they have an orthographic rule that all syllables must begin with a consonant letter, whereas the language they transcribe allows syllables to start with a vowel. In a few cases, such as Pahawh Hmong below, the lack of a consonant letter represents a specific consonant sound, so the lack of a consonant sound requires a distinct letter to disambiguate.

== Uses ==
- The letter א aleph is a zero consonant in Ashkenazi Hebrew. It originally represented a glottal stop, a value it retains in other Hebrew dialects and in formal Israeli Hebrew.
- In Arabic, the non-hamzated letter ⟨ا⟩ alif is often a placeholder for an initial vowel.
- In Javanese script, the letter ꦲ ha is used for a vowel (silent 'h').
- In Korean hangul, the zero consonant is ㅇ (이응) ieung. It appears twice in 오이; oi, "cucumber". ㅇ also represents /ŋ/ -ng at the end of a syllable, but historically this was a distinct letter.
- Burmese အ, Khmer អ, Thai อ (อ อ่าง), Lao ອ (ອ ໂອ), Shan ဢ (ဢ ဢၢင်ႇ) are null-initial vowel-support letters. Thai อ่าง, for example, is ang "basin". (า is the vowel a and ง the consonant ng.) อ and ອ pull double duty as vowels in some positions.
- In Thaana of the Maldives, އ is a zero. It requires a diacritic to indicate the associated vowel: އި is i, އޮ o, etc. This is similar to an abjad, but the vowel mark is not optional.
- The Lontara script for Buginese, with zero ᨕ, is similar to Thaana, except that without a vowel diacritic ᨕ represents an initial vowel a. The Lepcha script of Nepal is similar.
- In the Canadian Aboriginal syllabics, a triangle represents a vowel-initial syllable. The orientation of this triangle specifies the vowel: ᐁ e, ᐃ i, ᐅ o, ᐊ a.
- In the Romanized Popular Alphabet used for Hmong, an apostrophe marks a vowel-initial syllable. The absence of any letter indicates that the syllable starts with a glottal stop, a far more common occurrence.
- Pahawh Hmong, a semi-syllabary, also has a zero consonant, as well as a letter for glottal stop, with the lack of an initial consonant letter indicating that the syllable begins with a /k/.

== See also ==
- Virama, a zero-vowel diacritic in many abugidas, such as Hindi Devanagari. The virama marks the absence of a vowel; the absence of a virama or vowel diacritic implies an inherent vowel such as /a/.
- Sukun, the optional zero-vowel diacritic of Arabic.
- Zero (linguistics), a broader concept
- Silent letter
- Smooth breathing
