= Pahawh Hmong (Unicode block) =

Unicode for writing West Hmongic languages

- Range: U+16B00..U+16B8F (144 code points)
- Plane: SMP
- Scripts: Pahawh Hmong
- Major alphabets: Pahawh Hmong
- Assigned: 127 code points
- Unused: 17 reserved code points

Unicode Version History
- 7.0 (2014): 127 (+127)

Unicode documentation
- Code chart ∣ Web page

Pahawh Hmong is a Unicode block containing characters for writing two West Hmongic languages, Hmong Daw (Hmoob Dawb/White Miao) and Hmong Njua (aka. Mong Leng, Moob Leeg/Green Miao), with the Pahawh Hmong script.

Pahawh Hmong^{[1]}^{[2]} Official Unicode Consortium code chart (PDF)
| | 0 | 1 | 2 | 3 | 4 | 5 | 6 | 7 | 8 | 9 | A | B | C | D | E | F |
| U+16B0x | 𖬀 | 𖬁 | 𖬂 | 𖬃 | 𖬄 | 𖬅 | 𖬆 | 𖬇 | 𖬈 | 𖬉 | 𖬊 | 𖬋 | 𖬌 | 𖬍 | 𖬎 | 𖬏 |
| U+16B1x | 𖬐 | 𖬑 | 𖬒 | 𖬓 | 𖬔 | 𖬕 | 𖬖 | 𖬗 | 𖬘 | 𖬙 | 𖬚 | 𖬛 | 𖬜 | 𖬝 | 𖬞 | 𖬟 |
| U+16B2x | 𖬠 | 𖬡 | 𖬢 | 𖬣 | 𖬤 | 𖬥 | 𖬦 | 𖬧 | 𖬨 | 𖬩 | 𖬪 | 𖬫 | 𖬬 | 𖬭 | 𖬮 | 𖬯 |
| U+16B3x | 𖬰 | 𖬱 | 𖬲 | 𖬳 | 𖬴 | 𖬵 | 𖬶 | 𖬷 | 𖬸 | 𖬹 | 𖬺 | 𖬻 | 𖬼 | 𖬽 | 𖬾 | 𖬿 |
| U+16B4x | 𖭀 | 𖭁 | 𖭂 | 𖭃 | 𖭄 | 𖭅 | | | | | | | | | | |
| U+16B5x | 𖭐 | 𖭑 | 𖭒 | 𖭓 | 𖭔 | 𖭕 | 𖭖 | 𖭗 | 𖭘 | 𖭙 | | 𖭛 | 𖭜 | 𖭝 | 𖭞 | 𖭟 |
| U+16B6x | 𖭠 | 𖭡 | | 𖭣 | 𖭤 | 𖭥 | 𖭦 | 𖭧 | 𖭨 | 𖭩 | 𖭪 | 𖭫 | 𖭬 | 𖭭 | 𖭮 | 𖭯 |
| U+16B7x | 𖭰 | 𖭱 | 𖭲 | 𖭳 | 𖭴 | 𖭵 | 𖭶 | 𖭷 | | | | | | 𖭽 | 𖭾 | 𖭿 |
| U+16B8x | 𖮀 | 𖮁 | 𖮂 | 𖮃 | 𖮄 | 𖮅 | 𖮆 | 𖮇 | 𖮈 | 𖮉 | 𖮊 | 𖮋 | 𖮌 | 𖮍 | 𖮎 | 𖮏 |
Notes 1.As of Unicode version 18.0 2.Grey areas indicate non-assigned code points

== History ==
The following Unicode-related documents record the purpose and process of defining specific characters in the Pahawh Hmong block:

| Version | Final code points (Note: Proposed code points and characters names may differ from final code points and names) | Count | L2 ID | WG2 ID | Document |
|---|---|---|---|---|---|
| 7.0 | U+16B00..16B45, 16B50..16B59, 16B5B..16B61, 16B63..16B77, 16B7D..16B8F | 127 | L2/09-234 | N3603 (pdf, doc) | Umamaheswaran, V. S. (2009-07-08), "10.23", Unconfirmed minutes of WG 2 meeting 54 |
| 7.0 | U+16B00..16B45, 16B50..16B59, 16B5B..16B61, 16B63..16B77, 16B7D..16B8F | 127 | L2/09-145R | N3616R | Everson, Michael (2009-05-04), Preliminary proposal to encode the Pahawh Hmong script |
| 7.0 | U+16B00..16B45, 16B50..16B59, 16B5B..16B61, 16B63..16B77, 16B7D..16B8F | 127 | L2/09-252R | N3667 | Everson, Michael (2009-09-14), Proposal to encode the Pahawh Hmong script in the UCS |
| 7.0 | U+16B00..16B45, 16B50..16B59, 16B5B..16B61, 16B63..16B77, 16B7D..16B8F | 127 | L2/12-013 | N4175 | Everson, Michael (2012-01-20), Final proposal to encode the Pahawh Hmong script in the UCS |
| 7.0 | U+16B00..16B45, 16B50..16B59, 16B5B..16B61, 16B63..16B77, 16B7D..16B8F | 127 | L2/12-112 | | Moore, Lisa (2012-05-17), "Consensus 131-C25", UTC #131 / L2 #228 Minutes |
| 7.0 | U+16B00..16B45, 16B50..16B59, 16B5B..16B61, 16B63..16B77, 16B7D..16B8F | 127 | L2/12-271 | N4298 | Everson, Michael (2012-07-24), Additional evidence of use of Pahawh Hmong clan logographs |
| 7.0 | U+16B00..16B45, 16B50..16B59, 16B5B..16B61, 16B63..16B77, 16B7D..16B8F | 127 | | N4253 (pdf, doc) | "M59.15", Unconfirmed minutes of WG 2 meeting 59, 2012-09-12 |
| 7.0 | U+16B00..16B45, 16B50..16B59, 16B5B..16B61, 16B63..16B77, 16B7D..16B8F | 127 | L2/12-371 | N4377 | Suignard, Michel (2012-10-24), Disposition of comments on SC2 N 4239 (PDAM2.2 text to ISO/IEC 10646 3rd edition) |
| 7.0 | U+16B00..16B45, 16B50..16B59, 16B5B..16B61, 16B63..16B77, 16B7D..16B8F | 127 | | N4353 (pdf, doc) | "M60.05b", Unconfirmed minutes of WG 2 meeting 60, 2013-05-23 |
| 7.0 | U+16B00..16B45, 16B50..16B59, 16B5B..16B61, 16B63..16B77, 16B7D..16B8F | 127 | L2/13-132 | | Moore, Lisa (2013-07-29), "Consensus 136-C8", UTC #136 Minutes, "Accept 19 Pahawh Hmong clan logographs at U+16B7D..U+16B8F for encoding in Unicode 7.0." |
