= Lateral release (phonetics) =

Release of plosive consonant into a lateral consonant

◌ˡ
- IPA number: 426

Encoding
- Entity (decimal): &#737;
- Unicode (hex): U+02E1

In phonetics, a lateral release is the release of a plosive consonant into a lateral consonant. Such sounds are transcribed in the IPA with a superscript ⟨l⟩, for example as [tˡ] in English spotless [ˈspɒtˡlɨs]. In Old English words such as middle/middel in which, historically, the tongue made separate contacts with the alveolar ridge for the /d/ and /l/, [ˈmɪdəl], many speakers today make only one tongue contact. That is, the /d/ is laterally released directly into the /l/: [ˈmɪdˡl̩]. While this is a minor phonetic detail in English (in fact, it is commonly transcribed as having no audible release: [ˈspɒt̚lɨs], [ˈmɪd̚l̩]), it may be more important in other languages.

In most languages (as in English), laterally-released plosives are straightforwardly analyzed as biphonemic clusters whose second element is /l/. In the Hmong language, however, it is sometimes claimed that laterally-released consonants are unitary phonemes. According to Peter Ladefoged and Ian Maddieson, the choice between one or another analysis is purely based on phonological convenience—there is no actual acoustic or articulatory difference between one language's "laterally-released plosive" and another language's biphonemic cluster.

== See also ==
- Nasal release
- No audible release
