= Shong Lue Yang =

Creator of the Pahawh Hmong (1929–1971)

- 𖬌𖬤𖬵 𖬘𖬲𖬞 𖬖𖬲𖬤
- Pronunciation: [jâ ʃɔ́ŋ lɨ̂]
- Born: 15 September 1929; Fi Tong, Vietnam
- Died: February 1971 (aged 41); Nam Chia, Laos
- Cause of death: Assassination
- Known for: Creator of both Pahawh Hmong and Pahawh Khmu writing systems, and the Hmong Chao Fa flag

Shong Lue Yang (RPA: Yaj Soob Lwj [jâ ʃɔ́ŋ lɨ̂], Pahawh: 𖬌𖬤𖬵 𖬘𖬲𖬞 𖬖𖬲𖬤; 15 September 1929 – February 1971) was a Hmong spiritual leader and creator of the Pahawh script, a semi-syllabary for writing dialects of the Hmong language, as well as the Khmu language.

Coming under suspicion by opposing forces, he was assassinated in February 1971, during the Laotian Civil War. It was also rumored that Nao Tong Yang, his brother-in-law, who had killed many people, gave the order to kill Shong Lue Yang due to fear and jealousy. He is honored as the "Mother of Writing" (Niam Ntawv) among some Hmong groups. Like the Cherokee Sequoyah of the early 19th century in Indian Territory (now United States), Shong Lue Yang is one of the few people from a pre-literate society known in history to have independently created an effective writing system.

== Biography ==
Born in the village of Fi Tong (Huồi Tụ), Vietnam, near the city of Nong Het, Laos, Yang grew up without learning to read or write, although he likely observed various writing systems. For much of his life, he subsisted as a farmer and basket maker.

Beginning in 1959, he reportedly had a series of divine revelations, during which he was taught the Pahawh script by a set of male twins. In his visions, he was instructed to teach the script to the Hmong and Khmu peoples. He believed that the groups who accepted the writing system would flourish and escape the hardships of the period that resulted in the Laotian Civil War. Afterward, Yang assumed the title of "Savior of the Common People" (Theej Kaj Pej Xeem) and began teaching the script and his message of redemption across Laos. He is one of the few people from a pre-literate society known to have independently created an effective writing system.

Following initial successes, including the building of a school in the village of Fi Kha, Yang was targeted by Viet Cong forces for his association with General Vang Pao and his troops. Later, he fell under suspicion by both Hmong groups who supported the Royal Lao Government (including members of Vang Pao's army) and by those Hmong who supported the Viet Cong Pathet Lao. General Vang Pao offered a reward and ordered the assassination of Shong Lue Yang, who was killed in February 1971 by Nos Toom Yang in the village of Nam Chia. By then Shong Lue Yang had completed his final version of the Pahawh Hmong script.

Nos Toom Yang never received the promised reward of 3,000,000.00 Lao Kip (approximately 158.96 USD in 1974). In 1974, while attempting to collect the bribe from General Vang Pao in Thailand, where many Laotians went as refugees, Nos Toom Yang was killed by Thai officials as ordered by the general. He was handcuffed, blindfolded, and thrown into the Mekong River.

Shong Lue Yang's writing system was republished in many books, including Mother of Writing: The Origin and Development of a Hmong Messianic Script (1990), by William A. Smalley, Chia Koua Vang, and Gnia Yee Yang.
