= Language Sciences =

- Discipline: Linguistics
- Language: English

Publication details
- History: 1979–present (in current format)
- Publisher: Elsevier (United Kingdom)
- Frequency: Bimonthly
- Open access: "back files" pre 1997 & all to developing world
- Impact factor: 0.682 (2020)

Standard abbreviations
- ISO 4: Lang. Sci.

Indexing
- ISSN: 0388-0001

Links
- Journal homepage

Language Sciences is a peer-reviewed journal published six times a year by Elsevier. The editor is Sune Vork Steffensen of the University of Southern Denmark.

The journal was founded by Thomas Sebeok in May 1968 as a publication of the Research Center for the Language Sciences at Indiana University. In its current version, the journal dates back to March 1979, when it was re-issued with Fred C.C. Peng as editor. A short history of the journal is featured in a 2017 editorial co-authored by Steffensen and the two Associate Editors at the time, Carol Fowler and Graeme Trousdale.
