= Romanized Popular Alphabet =

Romanization system for Hmong languages

The Romanized Popular Alphabet (RPA) or Hmong RPA (also Roman Popular Alphabet), is a system of romanization for the various dialects of the Hmong language. Created in Laos between 1951 and 1953 by a group of missionaries and Hmong advisers, it has gone on to become the most widespread system for writing the Hmong language in the West. It is also used in Southeast Asia and China alongside other writing systems, most notably Nyiakeng Puachue Hmong and Pahawh Hmong.

== History ==
In Xiangkhoang Province, Protestant missionary G. Linwood Barney began working on the writing system with speakers of Green Mong (Mong Leng), Geu Yang and Tua Xiong, among others. He consulted with William A. Smalley, a missionary studying the Khmu language in Luang Prabang Province at the time. Concurrently, Yves Bertrais, a Roman Catholic missionary in Kiu Katiam, Luang Prabang, was undertaking a similar project with Chong Yeng Yang and Chue Her Thao. The two working groups met in 1952 and reconciled any differences by 1953 to produce a version of the script.

== Orthography ==
The alphabet was developed to write both the Hmong Der (White Hmong, RPA: Hmoob Dawb) and Mong Leng (Green/Blue Mong, RPA: Moob Leeg) dialects. While these dialects have much in common, each has unique sounds. Consonants and vowels found only in White Hmong (denoted with †) or Green Mong (denoted with ⁂) are color-coded respectively. Some writers make use of variant spellings. Much as with Tosk for Albanian, White Hmong was arbitrarily chosen to be the "standard" variant.

=== Consonants and vowels ===
Occlusive consonants in the Romanized Popular Alphabet
Occlusives	Nasals				Stops									l	Affricates	
Occlusives	ny	n	m	ml	p	pl	t	d†	dl⁂	r	c	k	q	l	tx	ts
Unmodified	/ɲ/	/n/	/m/	/mˡ/	/p/	/pˡ/	/t/	/d/†	/tˡ/⁂	/ʈ/	/c/	/k/	/q/	/l/	/ts/	/ʈʂ/
Preceding ⟨n⟩					np /ᵐb/	npl /ᵐbˡ/	nt /ⁿd/		ndl /ⁿdˡ/⁂	nr /ᶯɖ/	nc /ᶮɟ/	nk /ᵑɡ/	nq /ᶰɢ/		ntx /ⁿdz/	nts /ᶯɖʐ/
Preceding/Following ⟨h⟩	hny /ɲ̥/†	hn /n̥/†	hm /m̥/†	hml /m̥𐞛/†	ph /pʰ/	plh /p𐞛/	th /tʰ/	dh /dʱ/†	dlh /t𐞛/⁂	rh /ʈʰ/	ch /cʰ/	kh /kʰ/	qh /qʰ/	hl /ɬ/	txh /tsʰ/	tsh /ʈʂʰ/
⟨n⟩ and ⟨h⟩					nph /ᵐpʰ/	nplh /ᵐp𐞛/	nth /ⁿtʰ/		ndlh /ⁿt𐞛/⁂	nrh /ᶯʈʰ/	nch /ᶮcʰ/	nkh /ᵑkʰ/	nqh /ᶰqʰ/		ntxh /ⁿtsʰ/	ntsh /ᶯʈʂʰ/

- The glottal stop is not indicated in the orthography. The few truly vowel-initial words are indicated by an apostrophe, which thus acts as a zero consonant.

Fricative consonants in the Romanized Popular Alphabet
Fricatives	Labial		Coronal			Dorsal		Glottal
Fricatives	f	v	x	s	z	xy	y	h
	/f/	/v/	/s/	/ʂ/	/ʐ/	/ç/	/ʝ/	/h/

Vowels in the Romanized Popular Alphabet
Vowels	Monophthongs						Nasalized			Diphthongs				
Vowels	i	e	a	o	u	w	ee	aa⁂	oo	ai	aw	au	ia†	ua
	/i/	/e/	/a/	/ɔ/	/u/	/ɨ/	/ẽ/	/ã/⁂	/ɔ̃/	/ai/	/aɨ/	/au/	/iə/†	/uə/

=== Tones ===
RPA indicates tone by letters written at the end of a syllable, similarly to Gwoyeu Romatzyh or Zhuang, rather than with diacritics like those used in the Vietnamese alphabet or Pinyin. Unlike Vietnamese and Chinese, all Hmong syllables end in a vowel, which means that using consonant letters to indicate tone will be neither confusing nor ambiguous.

Tone representation in Romanized Popular Alphabet
Tone	Example	Orthographic Spelling
High	/pɔ́/ 'ball'	pob
Mid	/pɔ/ 'spleen'	po
Low	/pɔ̀/ 'thorn'	pos
High falling	/pɔ̂/ 'female'	poj
Mid rising	/pɔ̌/ 'to throw'	pov
Creaky	/pɔ̰/ 'to see'	pom^{1}
Low falling breathy	/pɔ̤/ 'grandmother'	pog

1. ⟨d⟩ represents a phrase-final low-rising variant of the creaky tone

== See also ==
- Standard Zhuang

== Bibliography ==
- Clark, Marybeth (2000), Diexis and anaphora and prelinguistic universals, Oceanic Linguistics Special Publications, vol. 29, pp. 46–61
- Golston, Chris; Yang, Phong (2001), "Hmong loanword phonology" (PDF), in Féry, Caroline; Green, Antony Dubach; van de Vijver, Ruben (eds.), Proceedings of HILP 5, Potsdam: University of Potsdam, pp. 40–57
- Smalley, William A.; Vang, Chia Koua; Yang, Gnia Yee (1990). Mother of Writing: The Origin and Development of a Hmong Messianic Script. Chicago: University of Chicago Press. ISBN 978-0226762876.
