= Hmong women and childbirth practices =

The Hmong culture is patrilineal, allowing a husband's family to make all major decisions, even when they solely concern the woman. However, the Hmong women have traditionally carried a large amount of responsibility and some power due to their necessary contribution of food and labor to the family.

== Women's traditional roles ==
Hmong children learn gender expectations at a young age. Women belong to their marital family, and before marriage are considered "other people’s women" by their birth family or clan. Girls traditionally learned household skills from their female elders by the age of eight. Hmong women worked as housekeepers, child-bearers and caretakers, cooks, and tailors, and were responsible for making all of their families’ clothes and preparing all meals. Women also planted, harvested, and cleared fields with their husbands, carried water from the river, tended to the animals, and helped build their own houses and furniture.

=== Marriage and widows ===
"Marriage is considered vital in every Hmong person's life and is the basis for establishing ties with other family groups." Hmong men traditionally chose a bride from another clan, with the man's father arranging the marriage. It was taboo for a man to choose a bride from his own clan. The father would consult with his own relatives and the bride. She could decline the match, but if she and her family agreed, drinks were made and a bride price was discussed.

A traditional Hmong wedding consisted of three separate ceremonies of animal sacrifices and feasts. In the Hmong society, a woman keeps close relationships with her family and never takes her husband's last name. However, after marriage, she joins her husband's family to work and live with them. If widowed, a Hmong woman has few choices. According to a Hmong saying, "Widows cry to death". The woman's children belong to her husband's family and a woman cannot inherit wealth, which leaves her with virtually nothing. If her husband's brother marries her she can remain in her husband's family. Polygamy is condoned in Hmong society, but rare.

=== Paj Ntaub ===
A large part of Hmong women's culture is sewing. Hmong women are highly skilled and famous for their fine needlework and embroidery called paj ntaub (flower cloth). An example of this ancient craft can be found in Chinese art albums. Women spend years on one piece of clothing for a wedding or other celebratory attire. The cross-stitching, if done exceptionally well, is so fine it can appear to the naked eye as beading. There are five traditional patterns including an eight-point star, a snail shell, a ram's head, an elephant's footprint and a heart, which, when combined create a beautiful display. Women work all day in the fields and in the house and then sew by oil lamp throughout the night so that their children will have appropriate clothes for New Year’s.

== Childbirth ==
Hmong families usually consist of many children, fulfilling several crucial purposes. First and foremost, children guarantee the continuation of the lineage and clan. Children also provide helping hands for farm work, housework, and childcare. Being able to produce many children adds to a sense of importance for women, helping them feel a stronger sense of belonging within their clan. Children are also very highly celebrated in Hmong culture, as the Hmong people believe in reincarnation and center their lives around the family.

=== Pregnancy and labor ===
During pregnancy, Hmong women carried out their daily responsibilities until the day they went into labor. A Hmong woman would follow her food cravings to guarantee that her child would not be born with a deformity. Once her water broke she would then walk to the nearest water source and carry water to her house to wash her baby when it was born.

In the book The Spirit Catches You and You Fall Down, Anne Fadiman discusses a woman who gave birth to twelve of her fifteen children alone in the middle of the night. The woman, Foua, delivered each child into her own hands in complete silence, believing that noise would "thwart the birth". The father then cut the umbilical cord and the mother washed her newborn. The father proceeded to dig a deep hole in the dirt floor of the house to bury the placenta. If the baby was a girl the placenta was buried underneath her parents' bed, but if it was a boy it was buried with greater honor under the central column of the house. The Hmong believe that after death a soul returns to its birthplace, retrieves its placental jacket, puts it on, and begins its voyage to the sky. Women had a strict postpartum diet that consisted solely of hot foods and drinks. Cold food would "make the blood congeal in the womb instead of cleansing it by flowing freely". These beliefs were closely followed to ensure the continued fertility of the new mother and her ability to produce enough breastmilk. It is worth noting that the Hmong word lub tsho me nyuam, incorrectly translated in most of the literature as placenta, actually refers more specifically to the amniotic sac.

=== Hu Plig ===
A baby was not considered part of the community until a ceremony called the hu plig (soul-calling) occurred three days after its birth. Chickens were sacrificed and if the soul was content in its new body, the chickens' tongues would be curled upward and the skulls translucent. Either string or silver necklaces or bracelets were put on the infant to prevent the soul from wandering from the body. After this ceremony, the infant would be named and considered an official member of the human race.

== In diaspora ==
The Hmong people's way of life changed drastically during the Vietnam War. The United States could not send troops into Laos, so they instead trained Hmong men to fight in the hopes that they could keep Laos an anti-communist nation. Since the Hmong were fighting against Laos, they had to evacuate their homes there and live in refugee camps in Thailand. After the war was over, Thailand closed the refugee camps and Hmong people were dispersed all over the world to Western countries such as the United States, Australia, France, and Canada. The rest of the Hmong people fled to various countries in Asia.

Hmong women in the Western world had a difficult time adjusting to a new way of life, having trouble transferring skills they had learned in Asia to a different culture. The newer generation of Hmong women are generally more assimilated.

=== Women's current roles ===
The patrilineal and patriarchal family system has changed little since for those Hmong who emigrated to the Global North. Decisions about any family member of either gender are still passed down through the husband's family elders. Women contribute greatly to their families, but in different ways. Women tend to have somewhat more freedom in choosing a husband, but the families of the bride and groom still have the final say in the match. The woman does not live outside the home before she is married to protect her reputation.

Childbirth is also a different process now that hospitals are located in every neighborhood. Often a doctor will not release the placenta to the parents of the newborn and the Hmong fear that they will never recover the placental jackets necessary for the afterlife.

== See also ==
- Hmong American
- Hmong customs and culture
- Hmong textile art
- List of ethnic groups in Vietnam
