= History of the Hmong in Merced, California =

The Hmong are a major ethnic group residing in Merced, California. As of 1997, Merced had a high concentration of Hmong residents relative to its population. The Hmong community settled in Merced after Dang Moua, a Hmong community leader, had promoted Merced to the Hmong communities scattered across the United States. As of 2010, there were 4,741 people of Hmong descent living in Merced, comprising 6% of Merced's population.

== Culture ==
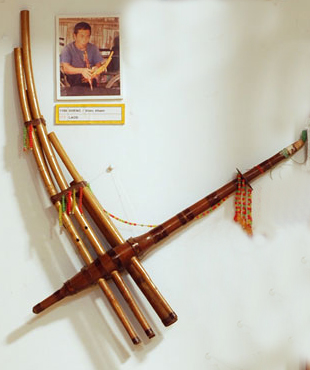
Qeej, the gourd mouth organ of Hmong music.

As of 1997 Merced has fourteen Hmong clans; they are the Cheng, Fang, Hang, Her, Kong, Kue, Lee, Lor, Moua, Thao, Vang, Vue, Xiong, and Yang. As a result, as of 1997 young people easily found exogamous marriage partners. Hmong often drive from city to city in the Central Valley. The Hmong who moved elsewhere go to Merced for subclan gatherings in a manner similar to how, in history, Hmong residents in Laos traveled to their home villages from satellite villages. Because of the manner of the Hmong using Merced as the location of the subclan gatherings, Anne Fadiman, author of The Spirit Catches You and You Fall Down, said, "Sometimes I felt that the other cities of the Central Valley—Fresno, Visalia, Porterville, Modesto, Stockton, Sacramento, Marysville, Yuba City—were mere suburbs of Merced." Because of the presence of a large Hmong community, it is easy for one to find a Hmong clan elder for dispute mediation, a txiv neeb, a Hmong herbalist, and a qeej player. Since, as of 1997, bamboo is not commonly found in Merced, qeejs are often constructed from PVC plumbing pipes.

== Beginning of settlement ==
The Hmong began to settle in Merced in the 1970s and the 1980s. The Hmong settled Merced and other areas in the Central Valley of California after the conclusion of the Laotian Civil War, when Communist forces won and began to oppress the Hmong, who had fought for the anti-Communist United States side. The Hmong fled to refugee camps in Thailand, then relocated to other parts of the world such as the United States, France, and Australia.

Members of the Hmong community settled in Merced because Dang Moua, a community leader and former clerk typist at the Embassy of the United States in Laos, promoted Merced. Fadiman said that from the Hmong point of view, Moua "bears the same relation to Merced that Daniel Boone bore to Kentucky or the Pied Piper bore to Koppelberg Hill." When Moua moved to the United States, he originally lived in Richmond, Virginia. While there he researched climates, crop yields, and soil conditions in other states. Moua's brother, a resident of Southern California, told him that the Central Valley had good weather and a variety of ethnic groups. Through the Hmong community social network, Moua learned that General Vang Pao planned to buy a fruit ranch near Merced. As a result, Moua left for Merced, arriving there mid-April 1977. While Vang's plan to buy the fruit ranch did not succeed, the Hmong community spread favorable reviews of Merced, and Hmong people from all over the United States traveled to Merced. Eric Crystal, an anthropologist, expressed surprise over the fact that the Hmong had converged upon Merced; he told a reporter for the Merced Sun-Star, "It was just wild! You'd see these Arkansas plates and stuff on the streets, I mean they were just pouring in from all over the place!" Because of the pre-existing Hmong settlement in Merced, Merced remained a favored destination for Hmong migrants.

In April 1982, Merced County had 1,800 Hmong people. On October 19, 1982 Merced County officials said that the county had 5,800 Hmongs, with most of them having arrived within six months of that day. Mike Conway of Merced Sun-Star said that the officials said that "they may be underestimating the total."

The Hmong believed that Merced was a farming community, but they discovered that the land was owned by other people, and they could not farm. Many Hmong who traveled to Merced became unemployed; they could not get high end agricultural jobs because they did not speak sufficient English, and Mexican migrants already held low end agricultural jobs. The Hmong arrived as Merced began to experience an economic recession in the early 1980s. In October 1982 the Hmong refugees present in Merced County had not stayed in the county long enough to become eligible to receive unemployment-derived benefits. They were not counted in the county unemployment rate of 13.5%, which represented 8,000 jobless people already present before the arrival of the refugees. In a meeting held by the Merced County Board of Supervisors, the members of the board were told that the addition of the Hmong in the labor pool increased racial tensions in Merced County.

Crystal told a reporter for the Merced Sun-Star, in the words of Anne Fadiman, author of The Spirit Catches You and You Fall Down, that it was "extraordinary" for the Hmong language to have a presence in Merced when, fifteen years prior to Crystal's statements, the language had an almost negligible presence in the entire Western world.

== Maturation of the settlement ==
As Hmong lived in Merced, they bought land and began to farm. In addition, as the Hmong presence continued, Hmong gangs appeared and began causing crime. When the Personal Responsibility and Work Opportunity Act was passed in 1996, some Hmong left Merced and settled in Minnesota, North Carolina, and Wisconsin. When Hmong women first came to the United States, they often married at 14 or 15 years of age. In 1990, the average Hmong woman in Merced had 8.5 children. By 2000 the average Hmong woman had 3 children. Women began to attend universities and complete their educations before marrying.

By 1997, Merced had about 61,000 residents. Of them, over 12,000 were Hmong, making the Hmong about 1/5 of the population of Merced. Because of the concentration of Hmong residents relative to Merced's population, Fadiman said that Merced was the "most intensely Hmong place in the United States." As of 1997 Fresno, California and the Minneapolis – Saint Paul area had larger Hmong populations than Merced, but Merced had a higher concentration of Hmong residents than those two places. Blia Yao Moua, a Hmong leader in the area, said that the concentration of Hmong in Merced "lets us keep more Hmong culture here than in Vientiane."

Around 2004 around 700 Hmong refugees were scheduled to arrive in the Merced area. They were originating from Wat Tham Krabok, where they had taken refuge in central Thailand. As of June 2004, of the population anticipated to arrive, most spoke little English and had little education. Over half of that population was of age to attend primary and secondary school.

According to a 2006 Anchorage Daily News article, of the metropolitan areas in the United States, the 2000 U.S. census stated that Greater Merced had the fifth largest Hmong population, with 6,148 people.

Because of unemployment, many Hmong left Merced between 2006 and 2008; some went to Alaska to work in industries, such as crabbing and fishing, that did not require a lot of English language knowledge. Dr. Long Thao, a Merced Hmong physician quoted in a 2008 Merced Sun-Star article, estimated that 8,000 Hmong lived in Merced, down by about half from the number in 1988 (15,000).

== Economic activity ==
In 1988, the Merced County Chamber of Commerce estimated that the Southeast Asian community in Merced County, which had over 10,000 people, spent $25 million each year. The Hmong community leader Dang Moua estimated that if each Southeast Asian refugee spent $1 per day, the figure spent by the Southeast Asian community on an annual basis would be $36.5 million. Moua said that because Merced-area companies are not aggressively courting the Southeast Asian refugee market sufficiently, millions of dollars left the Merced community each year.

As of 1997 the Merced Chamber of Commerce distributed a tourist brochure showcasing a Hmong woman holding vegetables.

== Social services ==
As of 2004 the Merced Lao Family Community Inc., a nonprofit organization that has been in operation since 1983, is the main support organization that provides social services to Hmong people.

== Media ==
The cable television channel Channel 11 broadcasts informative programming to the Hmong community twice per week. The radio station KBIF 900 AM, located in Fresno, California and serving Merced, airs programming oriented towards Hmong people. As of 2004 the station staff members state that 95% of the area Hmong community listens to the station.

== Politics ==
In 2014 Paul C. Lo received his appointment as a Merced County Superior Court Judge, making him the first ever Hmong American judge. Lo arrived to the U.S. as a refugee.

== Health care ==
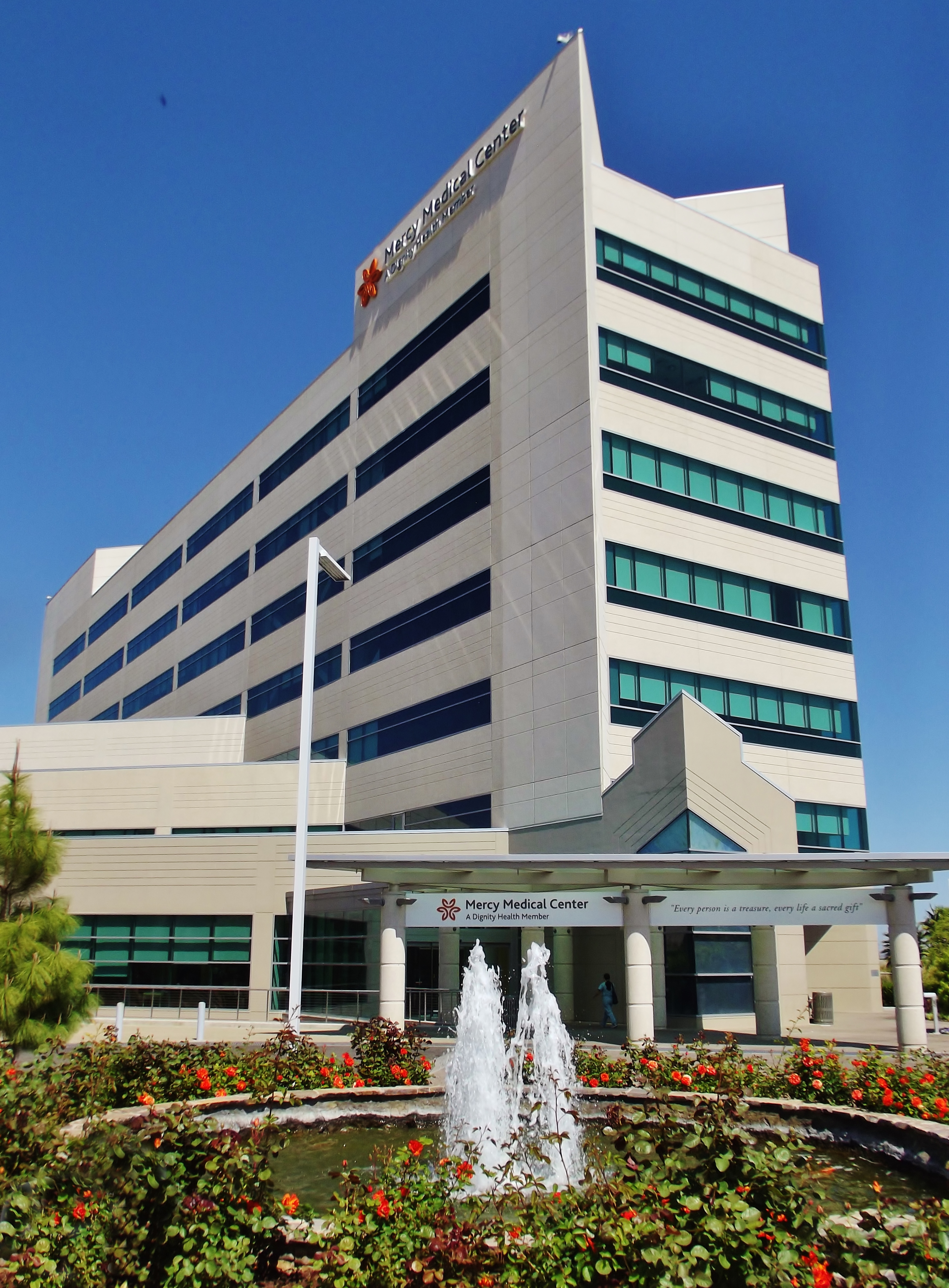
Mercy Medical Center Merced, previously the Merced Community Medical Center, has allowed Hmong shamans to practice abbreviated ceremonies and has made other efforts to assist the Hmong community

As of 2009, each day, Mercy Medical Center Merced in Merced has four new Hmong patients.

Around 1989 the Hmong population of Merced had difficulty communicating with the medical establishment in Merced's primary hospital due to language and cultural barriers. Miriam E. Warner and Marilyn Mochel, the authors of "The Hmong and the Health Care Delivery System in Merced," stated in 1998 that "Provider and facility insensitivity to the linguistic needs of the Southeast Asian patients sends a loud negative message about accessing health care to the ethnic communities in Merced County." The two stated that health care providers in the county had a lack of awareness of the history of the Hmong patients in the Laotian Civil War and the experiences during that war. In addition they stated that the providers had a lack of awareness of the Hmong beliefs and that Hmong patients had a difficulty in expressing and sharing their belief systems.

The 1997 book The Spirit Catches You and You Fall Down by Anne Fadiman chronicled the care of Lia Lee, a Hmong child in Merced's health system. The book discussed disparities that the Hmong in Merced encountered while accessing health care. Due to the book, several groups intending to improve the health care of the Hmong population formed. The book also prompted the hospital (then Sutter Merced Medical Center) to increase efforts to reach out to the Hmong community. The hospital hired additional employees, including Hmong employees. It also received a $246,000 worth of grants for cross-cultural training.

The Merced Department of Public Health began the MATCH (Multidisciplinary Approach to Cross-Cultural Health) program, intending to co-opt Hmong patients into the health care system.

In 2009 the Mercy Medical Center began to formally allow Hmong shamans to practice abbreviated ceremonies for Hmong patients. Due to the program, certified Hmong shamans have the same access to patients that members of clergy have. The allowing of Hmong shamans, the first formal medical policy in regards to the Hmong people in the United States, was a part of a national trend to use the cultural backgrounds of the patients to tailor medical care to them. The program was put into place to increase trust between the medical officials and the Hmong people.

By 2011 MATCH put out a survey to check the levels of health insurance within the Hmong community in Merced. Of 106 families, 60% said that they had an interest in applying for the Low Income Health Program health program, 53% had adults not covered by health insurance, and 15% had children under 18 who were not covered by health insurance.

== Education ==
In January 1983, 10% of the student body of the Merced City School District (MCSD), the elementary and middle school district of Merced, was Asian. Most of those students were ethnic Hmong refugees. In a span of less than two years ending in January 1983, over 750 refugee Hmong and Laotian students entered the MCSD. Dave Small, the superintendent of the MCSD, said that the number is "the size of one school—a good-sized school at that." At the time the State of California did not have ample funds to fund construction of a new school, and the district had concerns about overcrowding. The district used portable classrooms to handle the new students. Because of the overcrowding, the school systems had to increase class sizes, and several educational facilities faced strains.

The public school systems in Merced also found difficulty in funding English as a second language (ESL) programs for their new students. Merced High School North Campus, a school unit of the Merced Union High School District (MUHSD), the Merced high school district, had suddenly received over 200 Hmong refugee students, with almost all of them in ESL programs. Between the northern hemisphere spring of 1982 and January 1983 the school doubled the size of its ESL program.

The new Hmong students arriving in the Merced public school systems had varying levels of achievement, and many did not know written languages. Many of the new students to Merced public schools had inner ear infections, which led to degrees of deafness, requiring the district to enroll them in special education classes. Ann Simpson, the assistant principal at Merced High North, said that many of the Hmong students valued education and had almost perfect school attendance.

Merced College announced that it would begin offering courses in the Hmong language in 1987. It was one of the first U.S. educational institutions to offer courses in the Hmong language.

According to Jonas V. Vangay (Na Vaj or Vang Na), Merced College's southeast Asian coordinator, between 1985 and 1988, 75% of the Hmong high school graduates were male. In November 1990 the MUHSD had 1,057 students of Southeast Asian origin, including 597 boys and 460 girls. At the time the high school enrollment among Hmong had a large gender imbalance because Hmong girls were pressured to marry relatively early in their lives. The Hmong had a cultural tradition asking for girls to marry at the time they begin dating someone.

As of 2004 Merced's school districts have Hmong-speaking faculty and paraprofessionals who serve the Hmong population. Merced's community college and its two major high schools have Hmong culture and language classes. Between the early 1980s and 2004 MCSD gained experience with the Hmong culture, allowing it to more effectively serve the population. As of the same year, Merced's two major libraries have books in English and Hmong that describe the Hmong culture, history, and language.

Around July 2004 MCSD expected 150 to 200 children in a pool of refugees leaving a closing refugee camp in Thailand to enroll in district schools. The district used a grant for homeless students to fund various backpacks filled with school supplies to give to the new refugees. As of June 2004, in the camp sending the students, Wat Tham Krabok, less than 25% of the children attended school because the school had a tuition fee. The students learned Hmong and Thai, and had very little English instruction. The MCSD district established a separate school so that the Hmong refugees could receive intensive English education. In August 2004 the MCSD opened the Newcomer Language Academy, a special school for the newly arrived Hmong immigrants. The school served grades Kindergarten through 8 and used portable facilities at the Burbank School. At the end of the 2004–2005 school year it had 133 students, while it had 215 students in March 2006. The school was originally planned to be established at Don Stowell Elementary School in southern Merced. Around June 2004 the MUHSD also prepared for the arrival of the new refugees.

== Crime ==
By the mid-1980s Hmong gangs began to appear in the California Central Valley. Fadiman stated that police officers told her that compared to black and Hispanic gangs in Merced, Hmong gangs in Merced were more likely to possess and use handguns. In her book, published in 1997, Fadiman wrote that Merced residents who disliked Hmong did not focus on Hmong gangs and instead turned their attention to "smaller, stranger crimes."

== Reactions ==
Merced residents often perceived the Hmong as being a cause of economic troubles because, as of 1997, a far greater proportion of Hmong were on welfare than White Americans and Hispanic Americans (their numbers are great, but not the percentage). Other factors contributed to the economic distress of the Merced region. Anne Fadiman, author of The Spirit Catches You and You Fall Down, stated that the Hmong residents were visible to the people of Merced while abstract economic factors were not visible, so the people of Merced focused upon the Hmong.

By October 1982, as a result of the sudden appearances and increases in the Hmong population, several Merced, California area officials expressed surprise, and the Merced County Board of Supervisors held a meeting on assessing the social service needs of the new Hmong population. Fred Wack, the chairperson of the board, said "The problem isn't the refugees, per se, but the money and costs that follow."

Seven out of ten Merced County residents voted for Proposition 187. Based on that statistic, Fadiman concluded that "even legal immigrants are unlikely to be received with open arms." Some groups in Merced gave favorable treatment to the Hmong, including local churches and a group of well-educated professionals, including politically liberal transplants from other U.S. cities.

John Cullen, director of the Merced Human Services Agency, said, "Merced has been a fairly conservative, WASPy community for many years." Cullen said that while other ethnic groups trickled into Merced over a long period of time, the Hmong came "in one big rush" and were "a jolt to the system," "inevitably" causing "more of a reaction." Cullen argued, "I think Merced's reaction to the Hmong is a matter of water swamping the boat, not a matter of racism." While recalling an event that Dang Moua told her, Fadiman said that on some occasions racism is a factor in the reception to the Hmong. Dang believed that a man who insulted him was a veteran of the Vietnam War who had mistaken him for a Vietnamese person, and thus perceived Dang as an enemy. Fadiman said that "Dang's hypothesis is not as farfetched as it sounds," since many in Merced had confused the Hmong for the ethnic Vietnamese. The former mayor of Merced, Marvin Wells, told a Chamber of Commerce luncheon that the "Vietnam refugees" were "a problem" for California. Fadiman added that, as of 1997, "it is not uncommon to hear the Hmong called "boat people,"" even though Laos is landlocked and "the only boat most Hmong are likely to have seen was the bamboo raft which they floated, under fire, across the Mekong River."

As the Hmong settlement matured and the Hmong children gained English language skills, the town's overall attitude began to be more accepting of the Hmong.

=== Articles about the Hmong in the Merced Sun-Star ===
When the Hmong first arrived, according to Anne Fadiman, the local newspaper, the Merced Sun-Star, "treated the newcomers like exotic guests." Because the word "Hmong" was not found in dictionaries at the time, news articles did not mention the word "Hmong." As the Hmong settled, the newspaper began to refer to the Hmong as "refugees" and printed headlines related to Hmong usage of social services. As of 1997 the Sun-Star now has a "Cultural Diversity page."

== See also ==
- The Spirit Catches You and You Fall Down
- Hmong American
