= Hmong customs and culture =

Ethnic culture of Hmong people

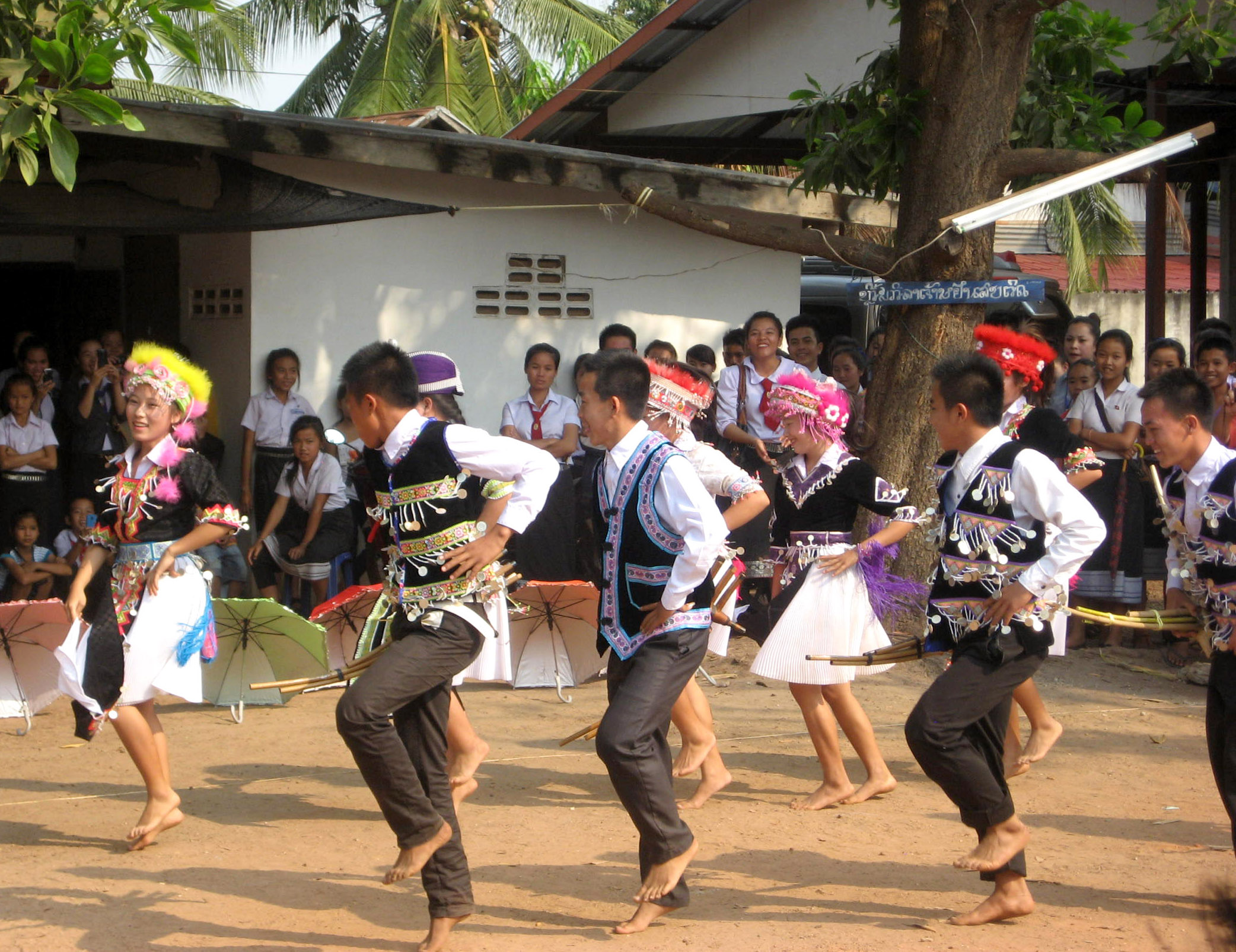
Students performing a traditional dance at a high school on the outskirts of Vientiane, Laos. Many Hmong families are moving into lowland villages and are becoming more integrated into Lao life but still retain a strong sense of their own culture and heritage. This performance was in appreciation of Big Brother Mouse, a literacy project that had visited the school that day with books and interactive educational activities.

The Hmong people are an ethnic group currently native to several countries and believed to have originated in the Yangtze River Basin in southern China. Throughout recorded history, the Hmong have remained identifiable as Hmong because they have maintained the Hmong language, customs, and ways of life while adopting the ways of the country in which they live, including Laos, Thailand, Vietnam, Myanmar, and China—which is home to one of the biggest Hmong populations in the world (5 million)—as well as the United States, French Guiana, Australia, France, and Germany. In the United States, new generations of Hmong are gradually assimilating into American society while being taught Hmong culture and history by their elders. Many fear that as the older generations pass on, the knowledge of the Hmong among Hmong Americans and other parts of the Hmong diaspora will die, as well.

== Social organization ==
The clan (Hmong: qhua; Chinese: 姓, romanized: xeem) has been a dominant organizing force in Hmong society. There are about eighteen known Hmong clans in Laos and Thailand. Members of a clan who share the same ritual practices may identify themselves as a sub-clan of that particular clan.

Clan membership is inherited upon birth or occasionally through adoption. Women become members of their husband's family upon marriage but will retain their clan name of their father. Members of the same clan consider each other to be kwv tij (lit. 'brothers' or 'siblings') and they are expected to offer one another mutual support. The term kwv tij is regarded as one's father's family or in the case of women who are married it refers to their in-laws. A related term, neej tsa, refers to the wife's family after marriage. However, she regards her birth family to be her kwv tij until she is married. Also, many clans even consider each last name as their kwv tij. For example, the Khab, Kwm, and Koo clans (Khang, Kue, and Kong, respectively) consider themselves kwv tij because they share a history of helping each other and respect for each other. Respected clan leaders are expected to take responsibility for conflict negotiation and occasionally the maintenance of religious rituals.

Qhua, Hmong RPA	Xeem, Hmong RPA	English	Chinese Character	Pahawh Clan Symbols
⎯	Faaj (Faj)	Fang, Fa,	黃	𖮋
Taag	Haam (Ham)	Hang, Hung	項	𖮉
Dluag	Hawj	Hue, Heu, Her, Herr, Hur	侯	𖮃
Plua	Khaab (Khab)	Khang, Kha	康	𖮈
Xoom	Koo, Xoom	Kong, Soung	龔，宋	𖮂
Nkws	Kwm	Kue, Ku	古	𖮎
⎯	Lauj	Lo, Lor, Lau, Lao	劉	𖮀
Cai	Lis	Lee, Ly, Li	李	𖭿
Zaag	Muas	Moua, Mua, Mas	馬	𖮄
⎯	Phaab (Phab)	Pha	潘	𖮇
Dlua	Thoj	Thao, Thoa, Tho, Thor	陶	𖮅
Nrig	Tsab (Tsaab)	Cha, Chang, Tcha, Chah, Jiang, Zhang	張	𖮆
⎯	Tsheej	Cheng, Cheung, Chen, Shang	陳	𖭽
⎯	Tswb	Chue, Chu, Tchue	朱	𖮍
Vug	Vaj (Vaaj)	Vang, Veng, Va, Wang, Wa	王	𖮊
⎯	Vwj	Vue, Vu, Wu	吳	𖮏
Mob	Xyooj	Xiong, Song	熊	𖮁
Yawg	Yaj (Yaaj)	Yang, Young	楊	𖮌

== Marriage ==
Clan groups are exogamous: that is, a Hmong may not be married within their own clan group, and instead must be married into another clan. For example, a Xiong may not marry another Xiong, but may marry or be married to a Hawj. Hmong marriage customs differ slightly based on cultural subdivisions within the global Hmong community, but all require the exchange of a black umbrella tied with a black-and-white striped ribbon (siv ceeb) to symbolize the couple's commitment to each other, as well as a bride price from the groom's family to the bride's family.

Traditionally, when a boy wants to marry a girl, he will make his intentions clear and court her by singing courtship poems (kwv txiaj) sung using leaf flutes. However, bride kidnapping (zij poj niam, 'marriage by capture') is also a common practice, preferably done while the girl is away from her home, alone, and often without her and her family's consent.

For marriage in which consent is sought and received, after a boy falls for a girl and wishes to marry her, he must ask his father, brother, other older relatives, or his clan's leader relatives to ask the girl's family for her hand in marriage using a marriage broker (mej koob). Once a marriage has been accepted, a groomsman (phib laj) and a bridesmaid (niam tais ntsuab) are invited to the groom's house, along with the matchmaker, who will sing wedding songs and hold a black umbrella for the entire two days of wedding, and the boy and his father and relatives, who will offer a boiled, whole chicken, uncooked rice, salt, and oil for the bride's family's spirits, several cartons of cigarettes for the negotiators, and bottles of liquor for the groom and the bride's male relatives.

In procuring a zij poj niam marriage, before he bridenaps her, the boy must first give a gift to the girl whom he wants to marry. After waiting a few days, the boy may then bridenap the girl. If the boy never gave the girl a gift, she may refuse and return home with any family member who comes to rescue her. An envoy from the boy's clan is sent (fi xov, 'send message') to inform them about their daughter's location and safety. This envoy provides details of the boy's family background and, in return, requests the girl's hand in marriage.

A woman and her family have the right to refuse her hand in the man's marriage, in which case the marriage will be called off. For her to call off the zij poj niam marriage, though, her family must rescue her within three days to prevent the bride-napper's family from officiating the marriage.

Before the new couple enters the groom's house, the groom's father performs a blessing ritual (lwm qaib, 'chicken blessing ritual'), asking his ancestors to accept the new bride into the household. The head of the household moves the chicken in a circular motion around the couple's head, in hopes of removing bad luck from the newly-wedded couple. Afterwards, the girl is not allowed to visit anyone's house for three days.

Hmong weddings typically take at least two days and one night to complete, including the process of negotiating the dowry for the would-be couple, which is commonly handed over to the bride's family by the groom's clan and is traditionally set at four to six silver bars. However, in 2003, settlements made in the American currency were commonplace, ranging from approximately US$4,500 to US$6,000 (equivalent to US$7,876 – US$10,501 in 2025). If the dowry is accepted, the newlywed couple will move to the groom's house while the groom's parents prepare for the first wedding feast (noj tshoob, 'wedding feast'). At the end of this first wedding feast, the couple will return to the bride's family's home, where they spend the night preparing for the next day. The bride's family then prepares a second wedding feast at their home, where the couple will be married.

On the first day of the wedding, the bride will wear the groom's clan's traditional clothes. On the second day of the wedding, she will switch back to the clothes of her birth clan. After the wedding, her parents will give her farewell presents and new sets of clothes. Before the couple departs, the bride's family provides the groom with drinks until he feels he can drink no more, though he will often share them with his brothers. At this point, the bride's older brother or uncle will often offer the groom one more drink and ask him to promise to treat the bride well, never hit her, etc. Finishing the drink is seen as proof that the groom will keep his promise. Upon arriving back at the groom's house, another party is held to thank the negotiator(s), the groomsmen, and the bridesmaids.

In the 21st century, Hmong people who practice Christianity may follow traditional Hmong weddings, or they may exclude some rituals, such as the lwm qaib or hu plig ('calling the spirit of the new bride') rituals.Yang, McYoung Y. (September 24, 2020). "What Does Hmong-Married Mean?". Covenant City Church.

When a husband dies, it is his clan's responsibility to look after the widow and children. The widow is permitted to remarry, in which case she would have two choices: she may marry one of her husband's younger brothers or younger cousins (never the older brothers), or she can marry anyone from an outside clan (besides her own). If she chooses to marry an extended member from her deceased husband's clan, her children will continue to be a part of that clan. If she chooses to remarry outside her deceased husband's clan, her children are not required to remain with the clan unless a member of the clan (usually the deceased husband's brother or a male cousin with the same last name) is willing to take care of them. If no one from the deceased husband's clan is willing to raise the children, they will follow their mother into her second marriage. Once the children go with their mother to join their stepfather's family, a spiritual ceremony may take place. The children can choose to belong to their stepfather's clan (by accepting his surname, family spirits, and relatives) or remain with their original clan (their deceased father's family, spirits, and relatives). Often, regardless of the wishes of the mother or children, the clan would keep the son(s). Polygamy has been documented as a form of marriage in Hmong culture. It is rare among those Hmong who have migrated to Western nations.Moua, Teng (May 2003). "The Hmong Culture, Kinship, Marriage, and Family systems" (PDF). UW-Stout.

Divorce was rare in traditional Hmong society; however, it is becoming more prevalent in westernized Hmong communities. If a husband and wife decide to divorce, the couple's clans will permit divorce but will evaluate the situation fairly. If just the wife wants to divorce her husband without any firm grounds, the bride price must be returned to the husband's family, as the wife will be the one choosing to leave the household. If just the husband wants to divorce his wife without any firm grounds, the husband will have to come up with some money to send the wife back to her family, with all the daughters, and the sons will stay with the husband, as the husband will be the one choosing to leave the household. By tradition, the man and the woman do not have equal custody of all the children. If it is determined the wife had committed adultery, the husband will receive custody of the sons, the bride price and an additional fine. However, if it is determined the husband had committed adultery or married a second wife and the wife can not continue being part of the family, she will have the option to peg the husband. If the husband allows it, she can take her children with her. If a divorced man dies, custody of any male children passes to his clan group.

== Traditional gender roles ==
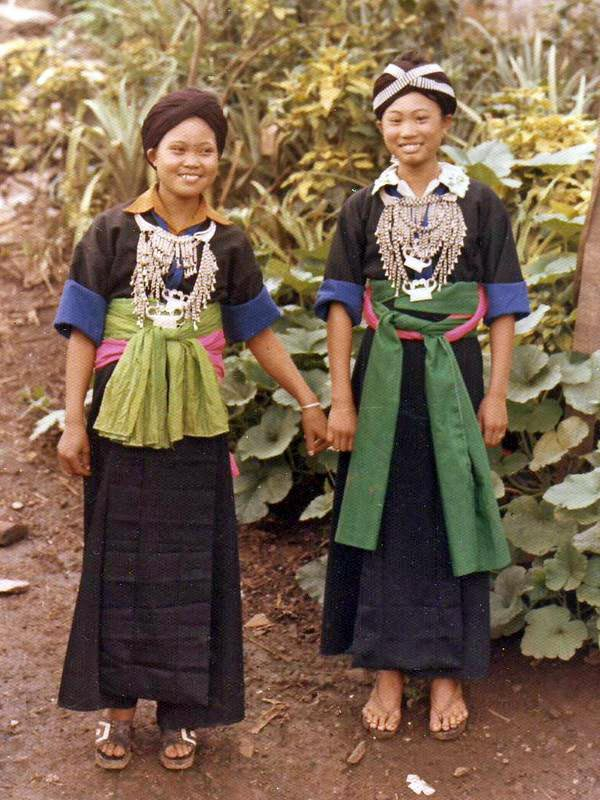
Hmong girls in Laos in 1973

Traditional gender roles throughout Hmong society have changed throughout the dominance in China along with Confucianism.

During the periods in which Confucianism reached its peaks (206 BCE – 220 CE) along with Legalism (法家) or Taoism (道家) during the Han dynasty. Although the early Hmong had no real commitment to the subordination of women, over time Confucian teachings were expanded upon. It was during the Han dynasty (206 BCE – 220 CE) that Confucianism was adopted as the government's state doctrine in China, becoming part of official education. In later dynasties, Neo-Confucian interpretations further reinforced male authority and patrilineal customs. According to the Confucian structure of society, women at every level were to occupy a position lower than men. Most citizens accepted the subservience of women to men as natural and proper. At the same time, they accorded women's honor and power as mother and mother-in-law within their family.

There are traditional gender roles in Hmong society. A man's duty involves family responsibility and the provision for the physical and spiritual welfare of his family. Hmong men have a system for making decisions that involve clan leaders. Husbands may consult their wives if they wish before making major decisions regarding family affairs, but the husband is seen as the head of the household who announces the decision.

Hmong women are responsible for nurturing the children, preparing meals, feeding animals, and sharing in agricultural labor. Traditionally, Hmong women eat meals only after the Hmong men have eaten first, especially if there are guests present in the house.

== Spirituality ==
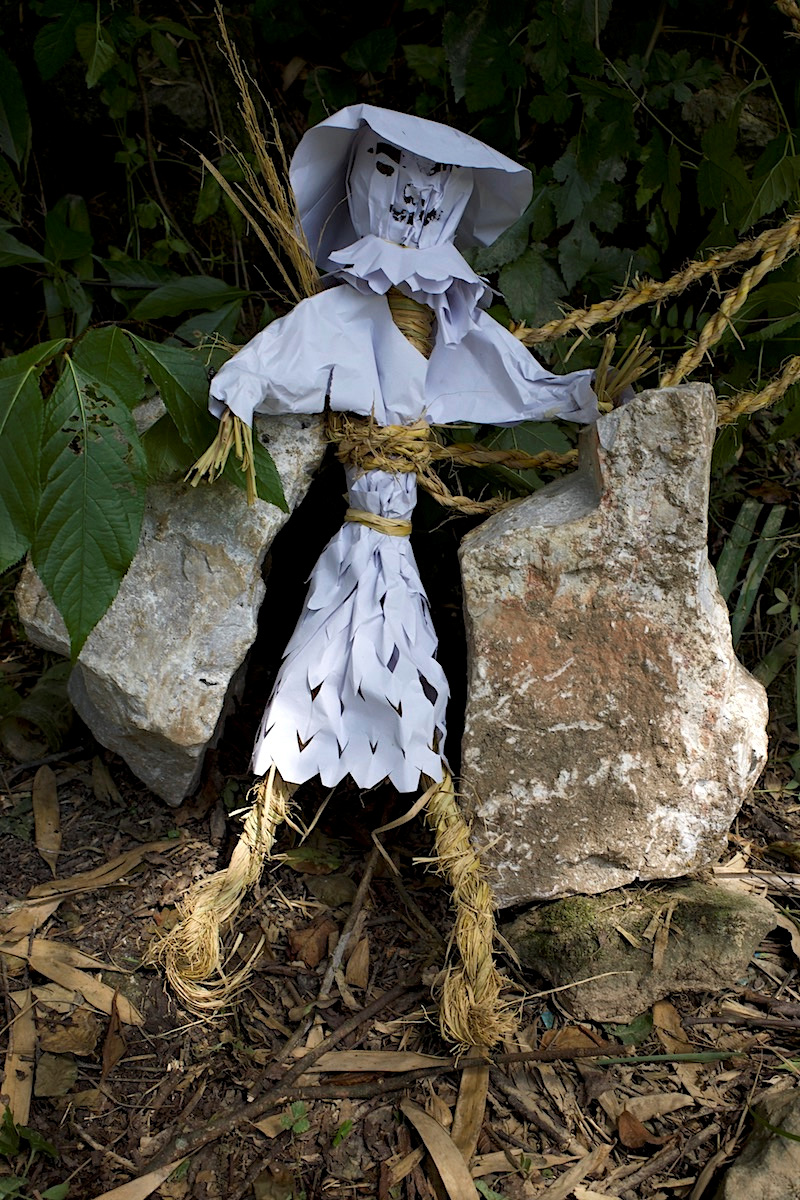
A doll ghost used for Hmong rituals, Xiangxi Tujia and Miao Autonomous Prefecture, Hunan, 2018

Contemporary Hmong people cannot be characterized as subscribing to a single belief system. Christian missionaries to Southeast Asia converted many Hmong people to Christianity beginning in the 19th century, and many more have become Christian since immigrating from Southeast Asia to the West. However, most Hmong people, both in Asia and the West, continue to maintain traditional spiritual practices that include shamanism and ancestor veneration.

These spiritual beliefs are combined with their beliefs related to health and illness. In traditional Hmong spiritual practices, one does not separate a person's physical well-being from their spiritual health; the spiritual realm is highly influential and dictates what happens in the physical world. According to these beliefs, everything possesses a soul, including inanimate objects. There is a delicate balance between these two worlds; thus, there is a necessity to revere and honor the ancestors for guidance and protection. The spirits of deceased ancestors are thought to influence the welfare and health of the living. Individuals perform rituals which include the offering of food and spirit money, pouring libations, and burning incense to appease the spirits and earn their favor.

The male head of the household does the worshipping of ancestral spirits. However, it is not surprising to find women engaging in worship. Rituals performed by the head of the household "in honor of the ancestral spirits" are for individual benefit and are usually performed during Hmong New Year celebrations. It is mainly to call upon the spirits of the house to protect the house.

Each person is thought to have 12 parts of the soul. These parts must remain in harmony to remain healthy. Some parts have specific roles. One of the 12 parts is reincarnated or joins a living relative or descendant after death, while the main part returns to the ancestor's home in the spirit world and remains near the decedent's grave. The soul of the living can fall into disharmony and may even leave the body. The loss of a soul or parts (poob plig) can cause serious illness. The number of parts lost determines how serious the illness is. A soul-calling ceremony (hu plig) can be performed by shamans when the soul has been frightened away, within the community, to entice the soul home with chanting and offerings of food. Shamans perform rituals because they are the ones who have special access to come into contact with souls or spirits, or in other words, the otherworld. Rituals are usually performed to restore the health of an individual or a family and to call one's wandering spirit back home. For soul calling, there are a couple of different ceremonies: one usually done by the head of the household and one by the shaman.

=== Animism and shamanism ===
For followers of traditional Hmong spirituality, the shaman, a spiritual healing practitioner who serves as an intermediary between the spirit and material worlds, is the primary communicator with the otherworld, able to see why and how someone became ill. The Hmong view healing and sickness as supernatural processes linked to cosmic and local supernatural forces.

In ancient times, it is said that humans and spirits lived together. However, due to conflict between the two very different beings, the deity Saub had blinded the two from being able to see each other. However, there is good and evil in both worlds; thus, whenever humans come into contact with the otherworld's evil, a shaman is needed to perform rituals to rescue or call back the sick person's spirit and/or to examine why the person is so sick. A shaman's task is to "reproduce and restore belief," not really the physical health, although it may seem so. Rituals, which serve as a treatment, might include herbal remedies or offerings of joss paper money or livestock. In cases of serious illness, the shaman enters a trance and travels through the spirit world to discern the cause and remedy for the problem, which usually involves the loss or damage of a soul.

This ritual ceremony, the ua neeb, consists of several parts. The first part of the process is ua neeb Saib: examining the spiritual aura of the situation to determine the factors.

If during ua neeb Saib the shaman observes something seriously wrong with the individual, such as a soul having lost its way home and caught by some spiritual being, the shaman will end the first part of the ceremony process by negotiating with the spiritual being ("whoever has control of this individual soul") to release the soul; most of the time this will do. After that, the shaman would lead the soul to its home.

After a waiting period, if the sick individual recovers, the second part of the ceremony, referred to as ua neeb kho, will be performed, during which joss paper is burned. Livestock is sacrificed in exchange for the well-being and future protection of the individual's soul. Extended family and friends are invited to partake in the ceremony and tie a white string around the wrist (khi tes) of the individual. The shaman blesses the strings, and as each person ties one around their wrist, they say a personalized blessing. Studies done within the Hmong American communities show that many Hmong continue to consult shamans for their health concerns.

A household always has a sacred wallpaper altar (a Thaj Neeb altar made of Xwmkab joss paper) in front of which the shaman performs the ritual when the shaman comes. Domestic worship is usually performed in front of this as well. This wallpaper altar serves as the house's main protector. It is the place where a household decides to place it, where worship, offerings (e.g., joss paper, animals, etc.), and rituals are performed. In addition, shamans also have their own personal altar that holds their special instruments and dag neeg. During a ritual, or when a shaman is under a trance, it is prohibited to walk between the altar and the shaman when the shaman is speaking directly with the otherworld.

Not everyone can become a shaman; the spirits must choose them to serve as an intermediary between the spiritual realm and the physical world. In Hmong shamanism, a shaman can be a man or a woman. Typically, there is a strong chance that an individual will become a shaman if their family history includes shamans. This is due to the belief that ancestral spirits, including the spirits of shamans, are reincarnated into the same family tree. Once blessed with the powers of a shaman, the individual will have to seek a teacher (who is a shaman) and begin training to become an official shaman that the society can call upon. Usually, the time required for a shaman to complete training depends on the spiritual guardians who guide the shaman in performing the rituals (dag neeg).

People who inherit the skills to become a shaman often experience symptoms of unexplained physical illness and states with similarities to bipolar disorder and psychosis. According to traditional Hmong beliefs, these symptoms result from shamanic spirits (dab neeb) trying to reach the shaman-to-be. For those who still practice shamanism, they can recognize these symptoms and cure their loved ones by helping them develop into full-fledged shamans. Those blessed to become shamans who do not want to practice shamanism often turn to Christian exorcism, Western medicine, and psychiatric work. For the few who accept the path to becoming shamans, it is considered an honor to help their own. In the Hmong community, shamans are highly respected.

=== Treatments and Practices ===
Many Hmong still follow the tradition of taking herbal remedies. A common practice among Hmong women is following a strict diet after childbirth. This consists of warm rice, freshly boiled chicken with herbs (koj thiab ntiv), lemongrass, and a little salt. It is believed to be a healing process for the woman. For 30 days (nyob dua hli), she will follow this diet to cleanse her body of residual blood and prevent future illness.

Kav (coining or spooning) is another form of treatment that involves using the edge of a silver coin or spoon to scrape the skin's surface. The process begins by applying tiger balm (tshuaj luan paub) to the areas to be scraped, supposedly to open the pores and release toxins. Some Chinese Hmong (Miao) spiritual practitioners work surreptitiously and use so-called gu sorcery in which they control others through harm inflicted by poisons gleaned from insects.

== Hmong New Year ==
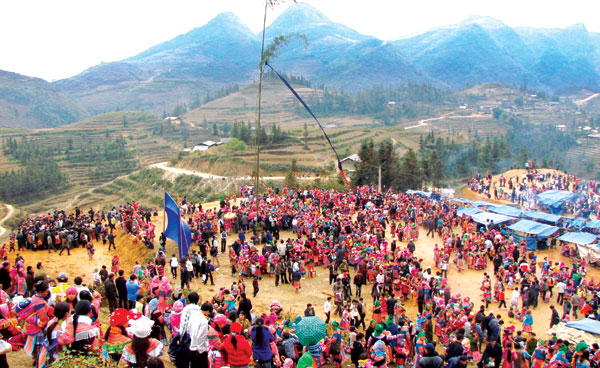
Hmong New Year Festivities – Hmoob Noj Peb Caug – Nkaum Tawv Qaib Lwm Sub

Hmong New Year, is a festival celebrated once a year after the harvest by the Hmong Miao people. It is called Hmong Noj Peb Caug Xyoo Tshiab (Hmong New Year) in the Hmong language and its origin dates back to the Song dynasty (960 - 1279), around 1,000 years ago. The celebration now takes place between September and December depending on where the Hmong live.

=== Timing ===
In Southeast Asian countries, Hmong New Year is celebrated by harvest end dates as well as by the lunisolar calendar. The Hmong lunar calendar refers to the time when the moon changes shape by waning (Hli tas) and waxing (Hli xiab). Months in the lunar calendar of the Hmong mountain tribes are always 30 days long, akin to the long month of the Chinese calendar. The celebration generally takes place on the 30th day of the 12th lunar month. It is then called Noj Peb Caug Xyoo Tshiab (ultimately saying "eat 30th" in the Hmong language).

In China, some Miao called it Miao festivals and others called it Miao New Year, or Lusheng festival. They celebrate the Hmong New Year in the third month of winter. In some provinces like Xijiang, Guizhou, and in Leishan County and Taijiang County also Kaili City they celebrate the Miao New Year at different times of the year. It is generally from the 9th month to the 11-month of the Chinese Lunar calendar that Miao, Hmong people in China celebrate the new year. Often, it lasts between five and fifteen days. In the Southeast Asian countries like Vietnam, Laos, Thailand, and Burma, Hmong people celebrate it between October and November, depending on their crops.

In Western world, Hmong people celebrate the Hmong New Year at the same time as Westerners celebrate Thanksgiving and Christmas with family and their friends.

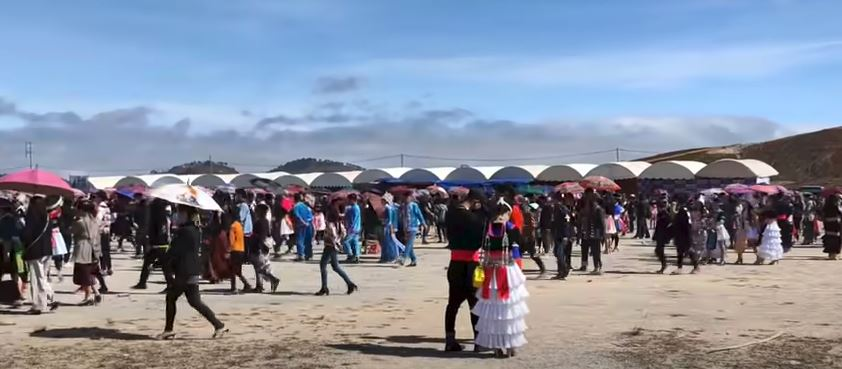
Panoramic view, c. Hmong New Year Festivity Playground

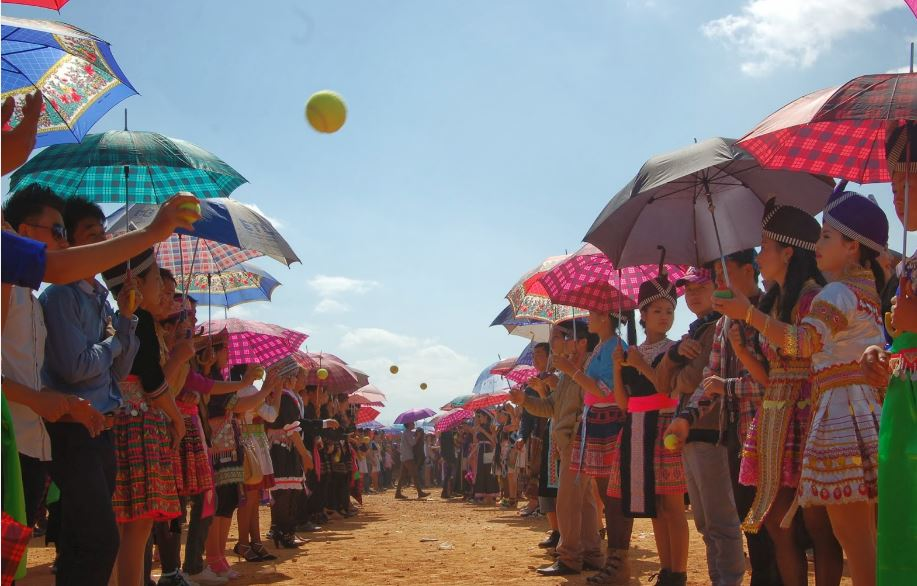
Young Hmong people wearing colorful clothes at the Hmong New Year

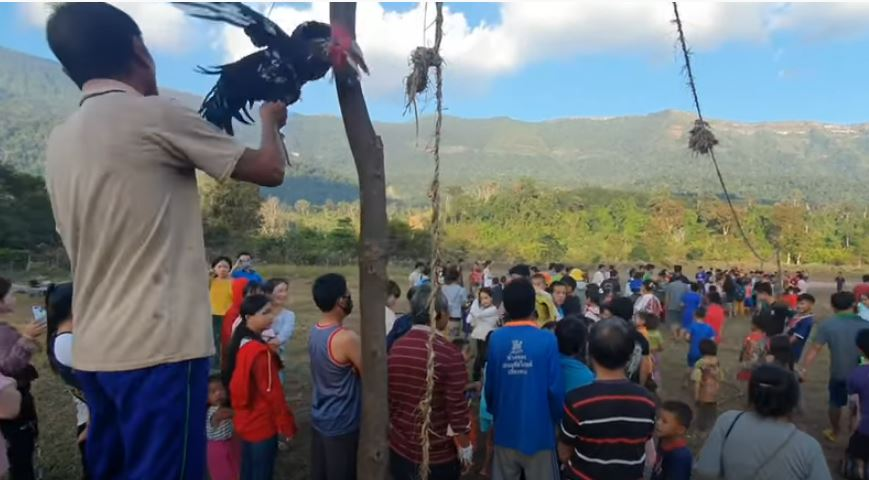
The traditional Hmong opening party before New Year's Eve – Hmoob muab Qaib Lwm Sub Rau Hmoob Noj Peb Caug

=== Celebration ===
On the date of celebration, the Hmong customs and traditions usually come first especially in rural areas. This comes from Hmong customs and culture since their ancestors. To begin with, a ritual celebration must take place before sunset to end the current year.

In Laos, the Lao government calls Hmong Noj Peb Caug Xyoo Tshiab (Hmong New Year) "Kin Tiang" instead of calling it New Year. The Hmong generally honor both their ancestors and their crops on of the Hmong New Year.

In Southeast Asian countries, the New Year's celebration lasts generally 5 to 10 days. It depends on the Hmong population in cities where people are living. For a small village, it takes 3–5 days. Hmong New Year celebration itself consists to tossing balls, wearing colorful clothing, and singing Hmong traditional poems and songs. Colorful fabrics mean a lot of things in Hmong history and culture. This is very important to Hmong men and women because the New Year only comes once a year. Wearing news and colorful clothes is a hallmark sign of the Hmong New Year.

=== Etymology ===
Noj Tsiab Peb Caug or Noj Peb Caug means celebration on the 30th, alternatively it means New Year's Eve. Noj means "eating" and Peb Caug means "30 (thirty)". Xyoo Tshiab means New Year in English.

== Clothing ==
Many tribes are distinguished by the color and details of their clothing. Black Hmong wear deep indigo-dyed hemp clothing that includes a jacket with embroidered sleeves, sash, apron, and leg wraps. The Flower Hmong are known for very brightly colored embroidered traditional costumes with beaded fringe.

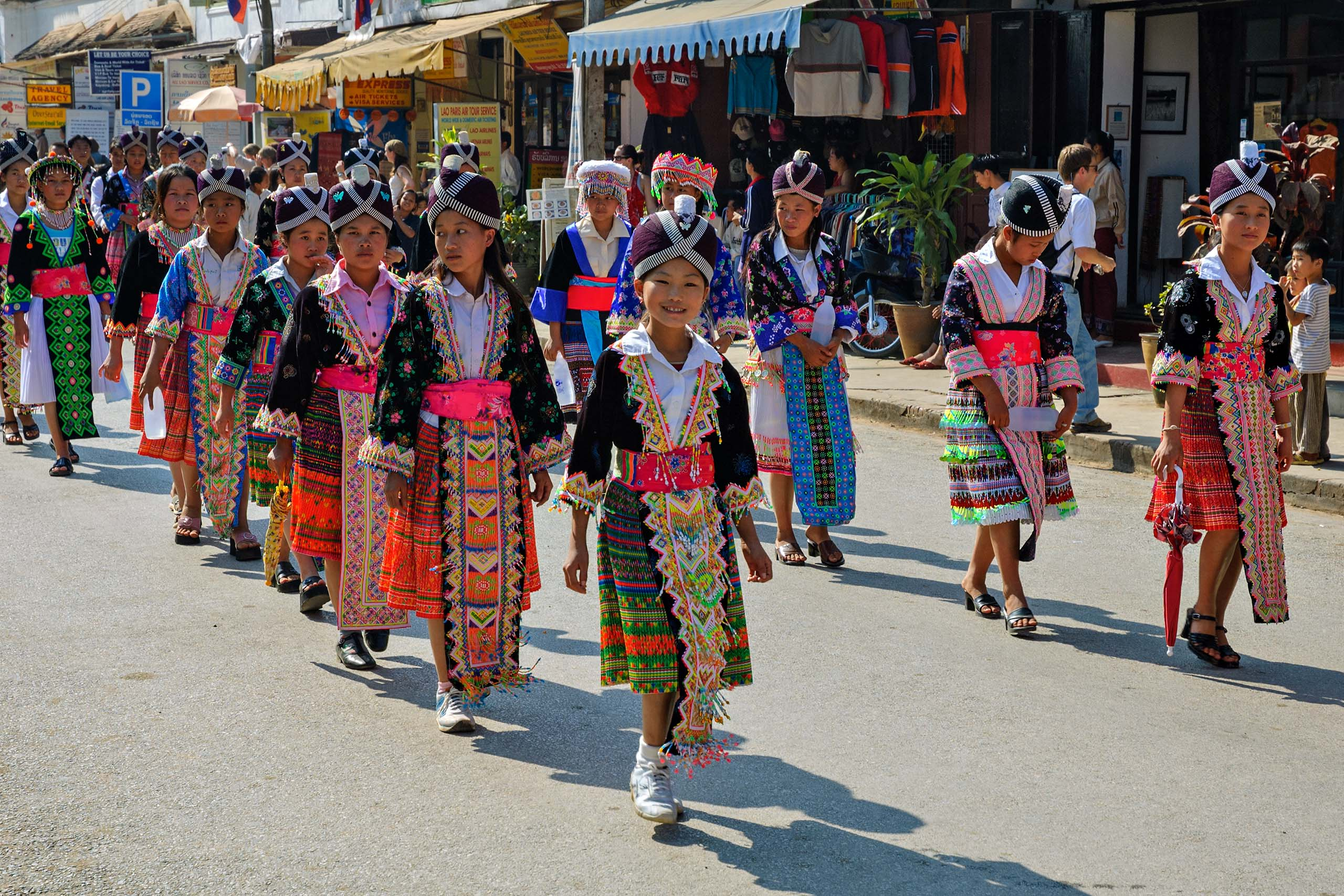
Hmong traditional clothes in UNESCO World Heritage parade, Luang Prabang, Laos

An important element of Hmong clothing and culture is the paj ntaub, (pronounced pun dow) a complex form of traditional textile art created using stitching, reverse-stitching, and reverse applique. Traditionally, Hmong designs were ornamental, geometric, and non-representational, being that they did not allude to nor contain any symbols that related to real-world objects, with the occasional exception of flower-like designs. Paj ntaub creation is done almost exclusively by women. Paj ntaub are created to be sewn on to Hmong clothing as a portable expression of Hmong cultural wealth and identity. The main traditional functions of paj ntaub are in funerary garments, where the designs are said to offer the deceased spiritual protection and guide them towards their ancestors in the afterlife, and for the Hmong New Year celebration. In the new year celebration, new paj ntaub and clothes are made by women and girls as it was seen as bad luck to wear clothes from a previous year, and they would serve as an indicator of the women's creativity, skill, and even propensity as a successful wife.

== Sports ==
=== Crossbow ===
Hmong people have traditionally used the Austroasiatic crossbow for waging war and hunting game. Today, crossbow has become an ethnic sport of the Hmong and regular shooting competitions are organized.

=== Spin-Top ===
Hmong people play a sport called tuj lub (pronounced "too loo"), or "spin-top", which resembles aspects of baseball, golf, and bocce. Tuj lub is played on a field 70 feet or longer, with large spinning tops 4 to 5.25 inches in height. Two teams of six players compete. Players spin or fling their top at the opposing team's tops using a length of thread attached to a two-foot stick, earning points by striking the opposing team's tops. A game lasts eight stages, and in each stage, the players must strike tops further away. It is traditional to play tuj lub on the first three days of the Hmong new year. An annual tuj lub competition between Hmong American teams is held annually in Saint Paul, Minnesota, where the city installed a tuj lub court in 2016.

== See also ==
- Hmong churches
- Hmong funeral
- Hmong music
- Hmong textile art
- The Spirit Catches You and You Fall Down, a book by Anne Fadiman about the cultural and religious comparisons and misunderstandings between a Hmong refugee family and the California health care system.
- Hmong Archives
