= Hmong funeral =

Hmong people have a culture built on animistic beliefs and a strong faith that after death the soul reincarnates as one of many forms such as humans, plants, rocks and ghosts (Goetz par. 1, 12). Death is often considered the most important time for practicing rituals in the Hmong community because without practicing the necessary rituals the soul will roam for eternity. Hmong culture has been around for thousands of years and some of the rituals have slightly changed due to immigration and urbanization. Throughout time rituals have always varied from tribe to tribe therefore there is no one-way of performing the pre-funeral rituals, the burial rituals and the post burial rituals. However, the differences are minor and are aimed at achieving the same goal of reincarnation.

== Background ==
The funeral is the most elaborate of all Hmong rituals. The overall goal of the performed rituals is to guide the soul back to the placental jacket, or motherland, then to Heaven to ask for reincarnation.

== Description ==
After death, the body is bathed by the sons or daughters of the deceased while extended family members are notified and begin to travel to the home of the dead relative (Tapp 81). After the body is washed it is dressed in only new ceremonial burial clothes. The deceased is dressed accordingly to their sex for the ceremony. Women ceremonial clothing is the regular traditional Hmong Clothes but the dress is made out of a tree and the back of the shirt would have a bigger embroidery square compared to the original ones. For men they get to wear a long shirt or gown that is made from a stiff fabric along with embroideries. Burial clothing includes hand-made hempshoes that help the soul across the caterpillar river and over the green worm mountain on the quest for their ancestors (“Death”).

=== Length ===
Funerals in the Hmong culture can last anywhere from two to four days depending on a number of variables. The main factor in determining the length of the funeral is choosing a good day to be buried. Another variable that alters the length of the funerals is present day laws. Western laws regarding treatment of cadavers and animal sacrificing have resulted in a change from the traditional ceremony (Falk, par. 12). The final variable concerning funeral duration is the way in which the deceased has passed. For infants and victims of violent deaths the body is disposed of with haste and little fuss because there are strong beliefs among the Hmong people that these deaths create negative spirits (Tapp 81). And for those who have committed suicide, their spirit roams around until they find a replacement to take their place. Supposedly, it can sometimes even lead to the spirit causing someone else to kill themselves.

An essential part of the mourning process is the three daily meals prepared by the men and women in the family. At each meal the ceremonial dish, laig dab that is composed of pork and rice, is offered to the deceased body by the eldest son, while the reed pipe instrument, called the qeej, plays a ceremonial song (Tapp 84). Another offering made to the spirit of the deceased is a daily animal sacrifice. Traditionally, the sacrifice has been a pig, bulls, and oxen. (Falk, par. 12). Once the offerings have been finished a lamp is lit on the dead body and male relatives retreat outside to fire three shots into the air to scare any evil spirits that may attack the house during this time of turmoil (“Death”).

Reincarnation is a pillar of the Hmong faith. During the ceremonies it is culturally taboo to show distress, as the ceremony is not about the death of the person but the rebirth of the soul and a new life (Goetz, par. 12). The main reason the funeral rituals are performed is so that the dead will be reborn into the same family. If the rituals are not performed properly the Hmong fear that the soul will be punished by returning as a lesser form or in a different family (Tapp 84). One ritual that must be completed is the payment of the deceased debts. Any debts unpaid are thought to negatively impact the living family along with the deceased party (“Death”).

=== Burial ===
In the Hmong culture a death is an extremely important event. The burial process must be performed correctly in order to protect those living and the deceased from evil spirits that are present when there is a death. The first step in burial is sacrificing a number of oxen that are prepared by the descendants of the deceased for a feast that the entire village partakes in to pay homage to the dead (“Death”). Once the body is prepared for its journey it is positioned on a table with items that will be necessary for the voyage into the afterlife. “A bottle of alcohol and a cooked chicken in the two halves of a gourd, together with a boiled egg, a crossbow, a knife and a paper umbrella, will be placed by the head of the corpse” (Tapp 83).

An initiatic poem, “Showing The Way” (White), is sung to help the soul on the journey to the afterlife. The body is removed from the house on a stretcher while “Song of Mounting The Way” is being played on the qeej (Tapp 84, 86, 87).

A female from the village will then guide the funeral procession with a torch to “light the way” for the corpse (Tapp 85). Along the way the procession takes steps to confuse the evil spirits. This includes stopping, changing course frequently and disposing of the torch before the burial site is reached (“Death”).

The final ritual before burial is the second sacred song, “The Song of Expiring Life” and informs the deceased they have passed on and need to begin the journey to the placental jacket and into the spirit world (Cha 73).

The traditional burial site is on the side of a mountain where the body is placed facing west. This is because Hmong people believe that west is the direction of death and if the head is facing the east it will be blinded by the sun (Tapp 86). The placement of the grave is determine by older members of the community and depends on age, sex, and status (Tapp 85 & “Death”).

Once the body has been laid in the ground and covered the stretcher used to transport the deceased to the burial site is destroyed while on lookers burn incense, symbolic paper and place stones on the grave (Tapp 85 & Falk 11). The symbolic paper, folded into boats, are considered as money in the after world. Burning the paper right after the burial, means you are sending money to go with them so they won't become a hungry spirit in the after life. The final step of the burial is to construct a fence around the grave that protects the site from any harm (“Death”). The celebration will continue on the way back to the village and throughout the next three days through performing a variety of rituals that vary from tribe to tribe all with intent to honor the deceased (Tapp 85).

=== After burial ===
There is a thirteen-day mourning period in which the family of the deceased observes certain sacrifices in respect of the passed loved one. On this day a ritual is performed with intent to welcome the soul into its former home one last time before it begins the journey into the after life (Tapp 87).

The soul (or recently deceased person) could also be reborn as the next child in the family through the males. Because of this, males in the family of that deceased person must not impregnate a woman between the burial day and the next two years. If they do, they must marry the female otherwise the child won't be born into the male's family, and they will lose that family member forever.

Per legend, this "13 day" ritual is based on the belief that a long time ago, after 13 days of "death," the corpse would return to life again--thus there is really no death at all. However, legend has it that, nowadays, we send the soul to be "reincarnated" because the corpse cannot come back to life anymore. Sometimes when a family member passes away due to murder, on the 13th day of the burial, their spirit would come back to take the souls that killed them into the other world.

== See also ==
- Hmong churches
- Hmong people
- Hmong language
- Hmong customs and culture
- Hmong cuisine

== Works cited ==
- Cha, Dia. "Teaching with Folk Stories of the Hmong." 2000. Libraries Unlimited.
- Conquergood, Dwight. "The Split Horn." PBS. ITVS.
- Falk, Catherine. "Hmong Instructions to the Dead." Asian Folklore Studies os 63 (2004): 1-29. Academiv Search Premier. EBSCOhost. 14599676.
- Falk, Dr. Catherine, comp. Music of the Hmong in Australia. 1994. University Of Melbourne.
- "History of Hmong People." Hilltribe. The Virtual Hilltribe Museum.
- White, Kenneth. Kr'ua Ke: Showing the Way. Bangkok: Pandora. 1983.
- Tapp, Nicholas. "Hmong Religion." Asian Folklore Studies os 48 (1989): 59-94.
