= George Howe Colt =

American journalist and author

George Howe Colt is an American journalist and author.

He is the author of November of the Soul: The Enigma of Suicide (1991), The Big House (2003), Brothers (2012), and The Game (2018). He is married to author Anne Fadiman. They have two children, Susannah Fadiman Colt and Henry Clifton Fadiman Colt.

Colt was a staff writer for Life. His 2003 book about his last summer with his family at their summer house on Cape Cod, The Big House, was a finalist for the National Book Award.

He graduated from Harvard University. His uncle was the lawyer and politician James Colt. The Colts are related to the prominent Forbes family, through which a distant cousin is politician and diplomat John Kerry.

== Works ==
=== Books ===
- The Enigma of Suicide. Scribner, 1991.
  - November of the Soul: The Enigma of Suicide. Scribner, 2006.
- The Big House: A Century in the Life of an American Summer Home. Scribner, 2003.
- Brothers: On His Brothers and Brothers in History. Scribner, 2012.
- The Game: Harvard, Yale, and America in 1968. Scribner, 2018.

=== Magazine articles ===
- Colt, George Howe. article on "Westchester cluster" of suicides that served as a source for his book, LIFE, 1984.
- Colt, George Howe & Hollister, Anne. "How Earthquakes Happen". LIFE, February 1989.
- Colt, George Howe. "See Me, Feel Me, Touch Me, Heal Me". LIFE, September 1996.
- Colt, George Howe. "Were You Born That Way?" LIFE, 1998.
