= Mercy Medical Center Merced =

- Dignity Health
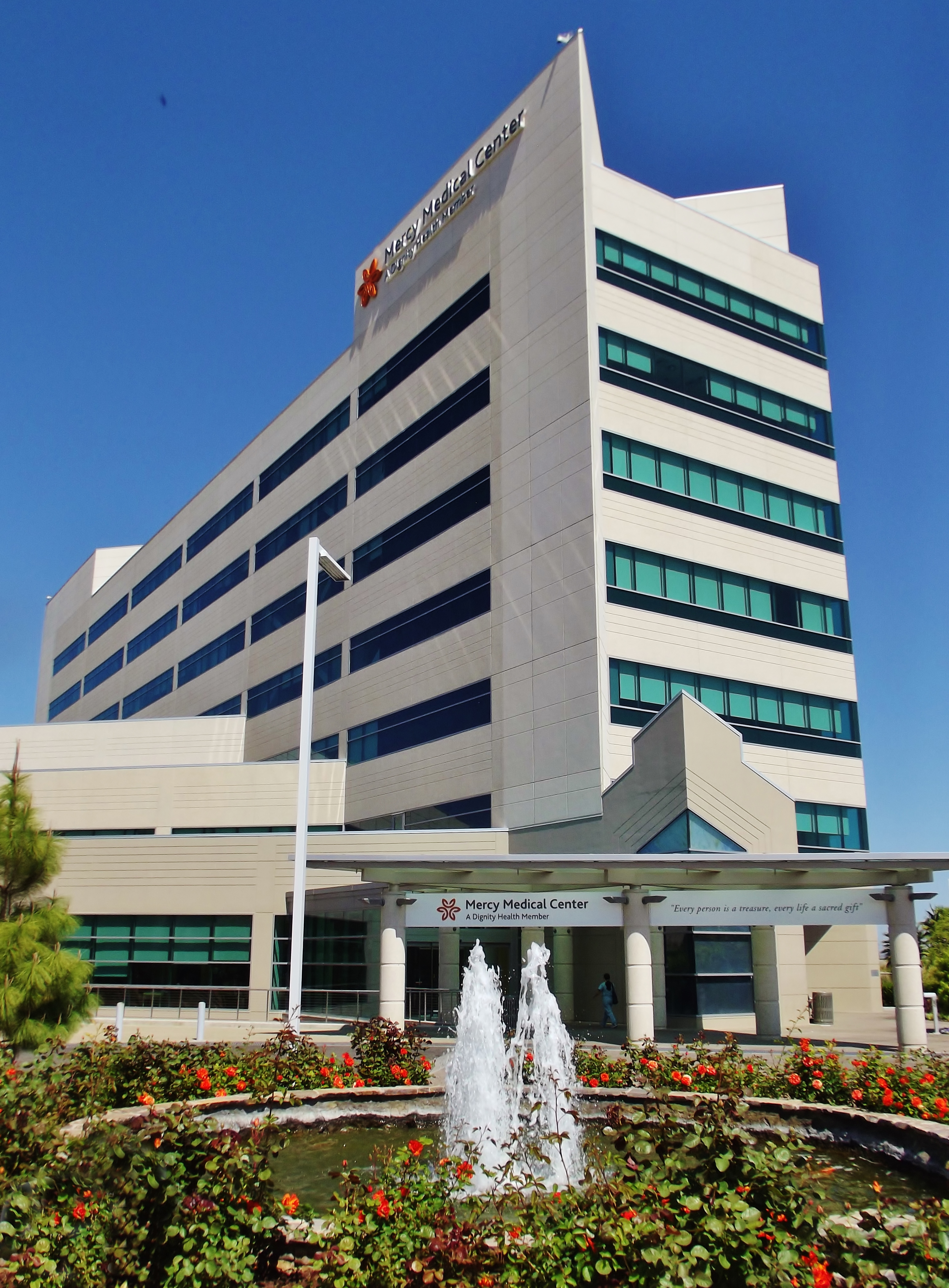
- Mercy Medical Center

Geography
- Location: 333 Mercy Avenue, Merced, California, United States
- Coordinates: 37°20′01″N 120°28′02″W

Services
- Beds: 185

Helipads
- Helipad: FAA LID: 86CN

Links
- Website: www.mercymercedcares.org
- Lists: Hospitals in California

Mercy Medical Center Merced (previously Merced Community Medical Center and Sutter Merced Medical Center) is a hospital in Merced, California. Dignity Health operates the facility.

== History ==
In the 1980s, Lia Lee, the subject of the book The Spirit Catches You and You Fall Down, was treated at this hospital.

In 2001, the State of California informed hospitals in the state that acute health care facilities would have to comply with new regulations on earthquake protection when they go into effect in 2008. The hospital administration decided to build a new hospital facility, even though some hospitals received extensions on the deadline for the requirement due to needing to retrofit their older hospital buildings. The new hospital opened May 2, 2010. In November 2009 the Mercy Medical Center Foundation set up a fundraising goal of $5 million to buy medical equipment for the new hospital.

In 2010, the magazine Consumer Reports said that in terms of hospitals across the United States, the patient rating of Mercy Medical Center Merced was 49 out of 100. The hospital responded, saying that its patient satisfaction was higher than the magazine stated.

== Facility ==
The current hospital, located on North G Street in northern Merced, was scheduled to open in August 2010. The first phase, built for $262 million, has a capacity of 186. The hospital administration planned to eventually have space for 435 patients within a 20-year period. The new hospital has 27 examination rooms, and most of the rooms in the current hospital are private.

The previous hospital, with a capacity of 174 patients, was located on 13th Street. As of 2009 the facility was over 50 years old. The previous hospital had 17 examination rooms and few private rooms.
