= Paul Francis =

American business executive and politician

Paul Francis is an American business executive and politician who has served under three Governors of New York, holding such positions as the Director of State Operations for the State of New York. In that position he oversaw the state's eight major departments, along with the other offices and divisions of the Government of New York. He has been described as “one of Albany's most influential behind-the-scenes players.”

== Early life and education ==
Born in Santa Monica, California, Francis was raised in Chappaqua, New York. He graduated from Yale College and New York University School of Law in 1980 and worked for Skadden, Arps, Slate, Meagher & Flom alongside Silda Wall Spitzer, Eliot Spitzer's wife.

== Career ==
=== Business ===
Francis worked as an associate at Shearman & Sterling LLP in New York from 1980 to 1983. From 1983 to 1986, he was an associate at Skadden, Arps, Slate, Meagher & Flom LLP & Affiliates in New York. From 1986 to 1993 he was Managing Director at Merrill Lynch in New York. From 1993 to 1997 he was Chief Financial Officer of Ann Taylor Stores Corporation in New York. From 1997 to 2000, he was CFO of Priceline.com in Norwalk, Connecticut. From 2001 to 2004 he was Managing Partner of the Cedar Street Group in Larchmont, New York. From September 2008 to May 2001 he was COO of the Financial Products Division of Bloomberg LP.

=== Politics ===
During Spitzer's 2006 gubernatorial campaign, Francis worked as policy director. Francis and Spitzer met volunteering for the congressional campaign of Edward Meyer, a former Westchester assemblyman who switched his registration from Republican to Democrat in the wake of the Watergate scandal.

Francis was nominated by Governor of New York Eliot Spitzer to replace John Cape in 2007. He had previously served as State Budget Director.

He continued to serve as director of state operations under Gov. David Paterson, who succeeded Spitzer on March 17, 2008. Francis left this position in July 2008.

He was an advisor on budget and policy issues during Andrew Cuomo's successful 2010 campaign for Governor of New York. He then served as director of agency redesign and efficiency from 2011 to 2012, during Governor Cuomo's first term. In July 2015, Governor Cuomo appointed Francis as Deputy Secretary for Health and Human Services for New York State.

Since 2013, he was Distinguished Senior Fellow at the New York University School of Law.

In 2012, Francis fell suddenly ill a few hours after Governor Cuomo delivered his second State of the State address, which Francis had helped write. He was hospitalized in Albany, developed sepsis, and spent two weeks in a medically induced coma that necessitated the amputation of his left arm below the elbow. He now has a metal hook in place of a left hand. After this experience, he became an advocate for paraplegics, serving as an Albany lobbyist for New Yorkers to Cure Paralysis. Since losing his hand, he uses voice-recognition software to write. “My disability seems so trivial compared with those who are completely paralyzed,” he has said. “It was my left arm and I'm right-handed. It seems so small. But it made me appreciate how your life can change in an instant and how important this research is.”

==== Board membership ====
Francis is a member of the board of the Citizens Budget Commission, which criticizes Albany's budget process and spending plans.

== Personal life ==
Francis and his wife, Titia Hulst, have two children, Charles and Eleanor.
