= Hmong textile art =

Asian textile art

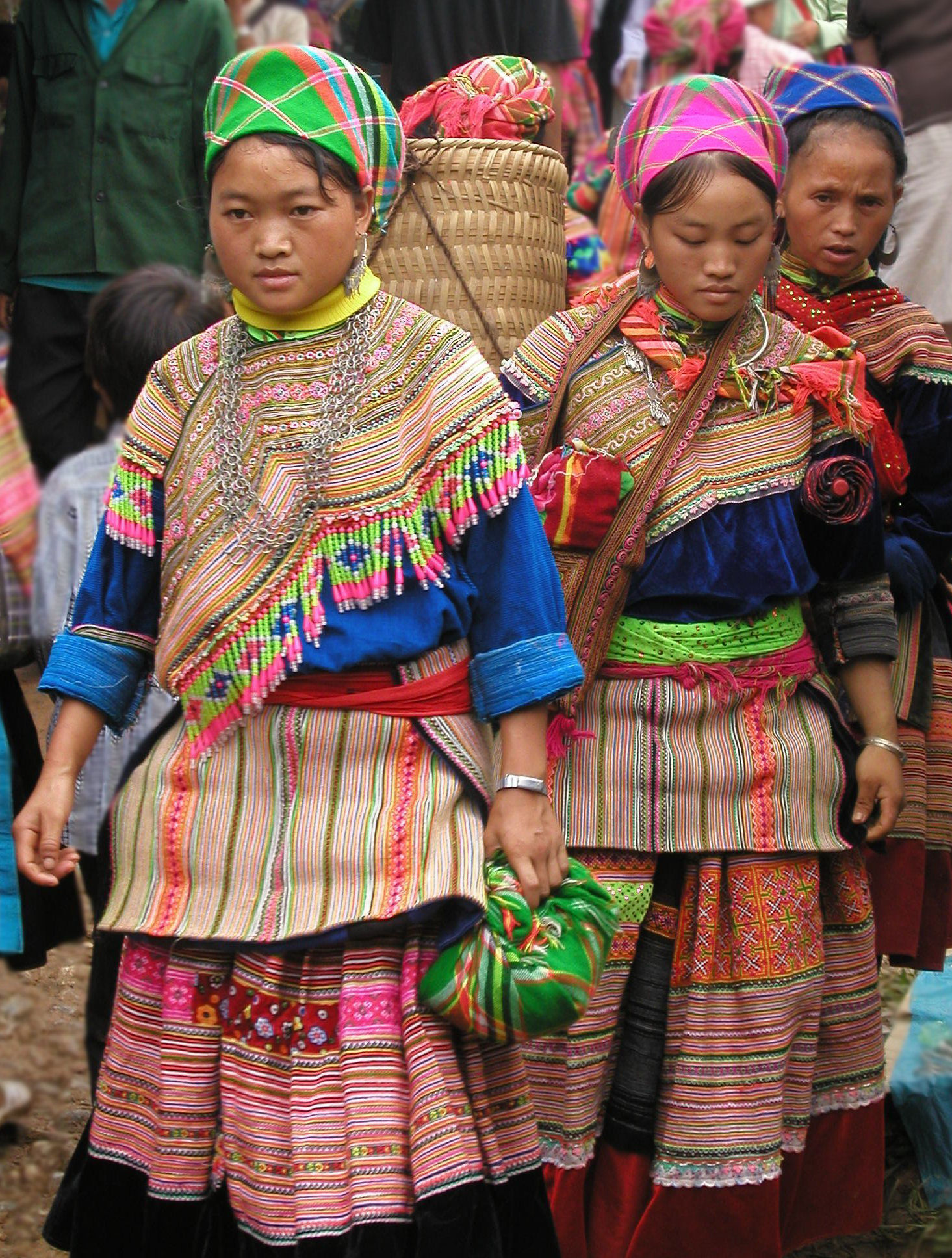
Hmong women at a market in Sapa, Vietnam.

Hmong textile art consists of traditional and modern textile arts and crafts produced by the Hmong people. Traditional Hmong textile examples include hand-spun hemp cloth production, basket weaving, batik dyeing, and a unique form of embroidery known as flower cloth or Paj Ntaub in the Hmong language RPA. The most widely recognized modern style of Hmong textile art is a form of embroidery derived from Paj Ntaub known as story cloth.

Traditional Hmong textiles like Paj Ntaub play a significant role in Hmong daily life and are often directly associated with larger cultural concerns such as religion, gender, economics, and ethnic identity. Modern textiles like story cloths provide important historical and cultural context and are often used by scholars and educators within and outside of the Hmong community as a means to understand and engage with Hmong culture.

== Traditional Textiles ==
=== Hemp cloth ===
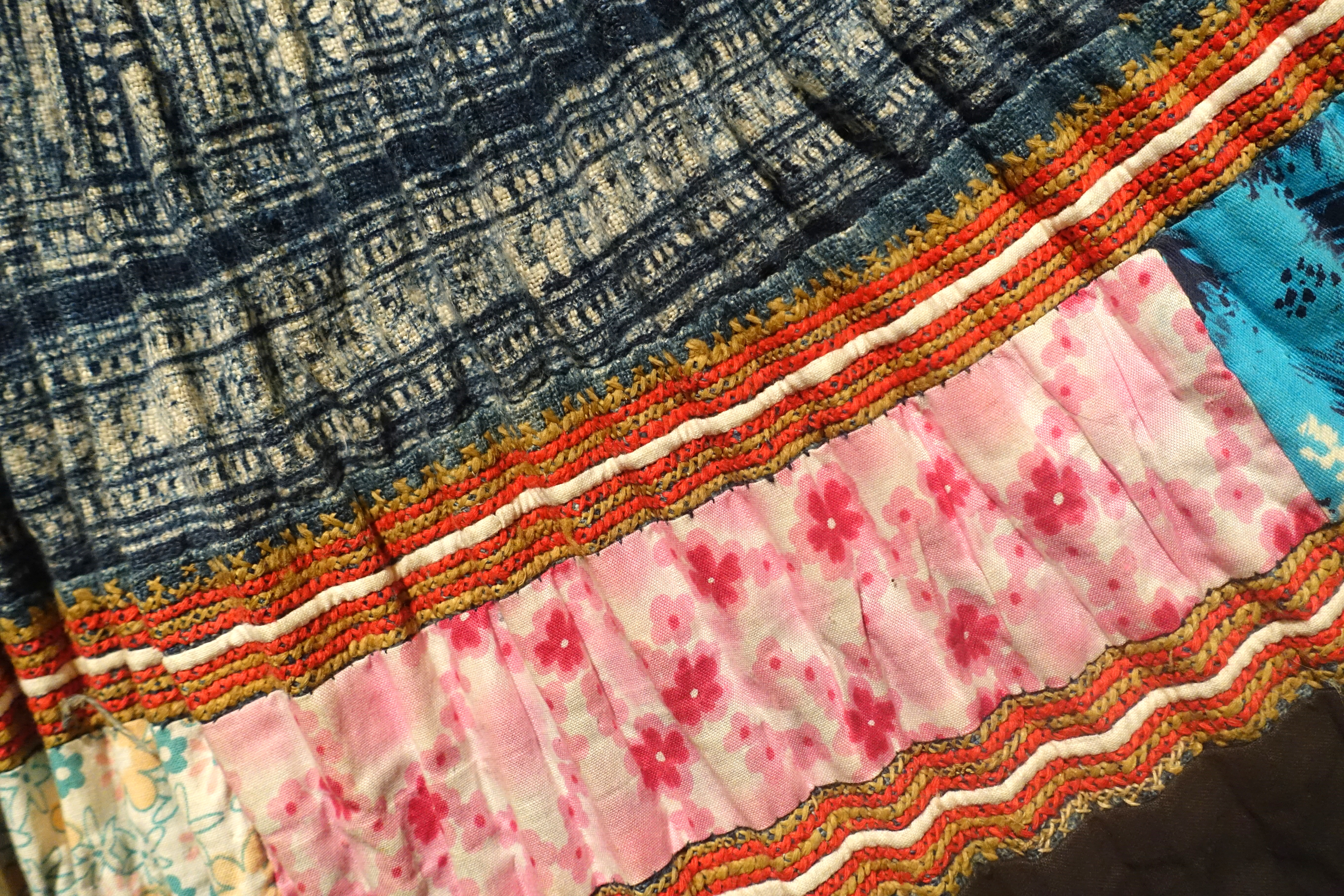
Detail of a Hmong skirt with hemp cloth and batik elements

Most traditional forms of Hmong textiles were originally made with hand-spun hemp fabric. Hemp, a species of cannabis, would be grown in small family or community farming plots until the plants were ready to be harvested and processed by Hmong women. To prepare the hemp for textile production, the plants would be dried in the sun and the fibrous outermost layer of the plant stalk would be stripped and separated into short lengths of fiber which would then be joined by hand-twisting the individual pieces to create a length of material appropriate for weaving. The coarse hemp fabric would then be produced by hand using a large wooden loom.

Due to the diasporic history of the Hmong, the inconsistent legality of marijuana, and the labor-intensive nature of hemp cloth production, most modern and contemporary Hmong textiles typically use either ready-made hemp fabric or other, lighter commercial fabrics.

=== Basket weaving ===
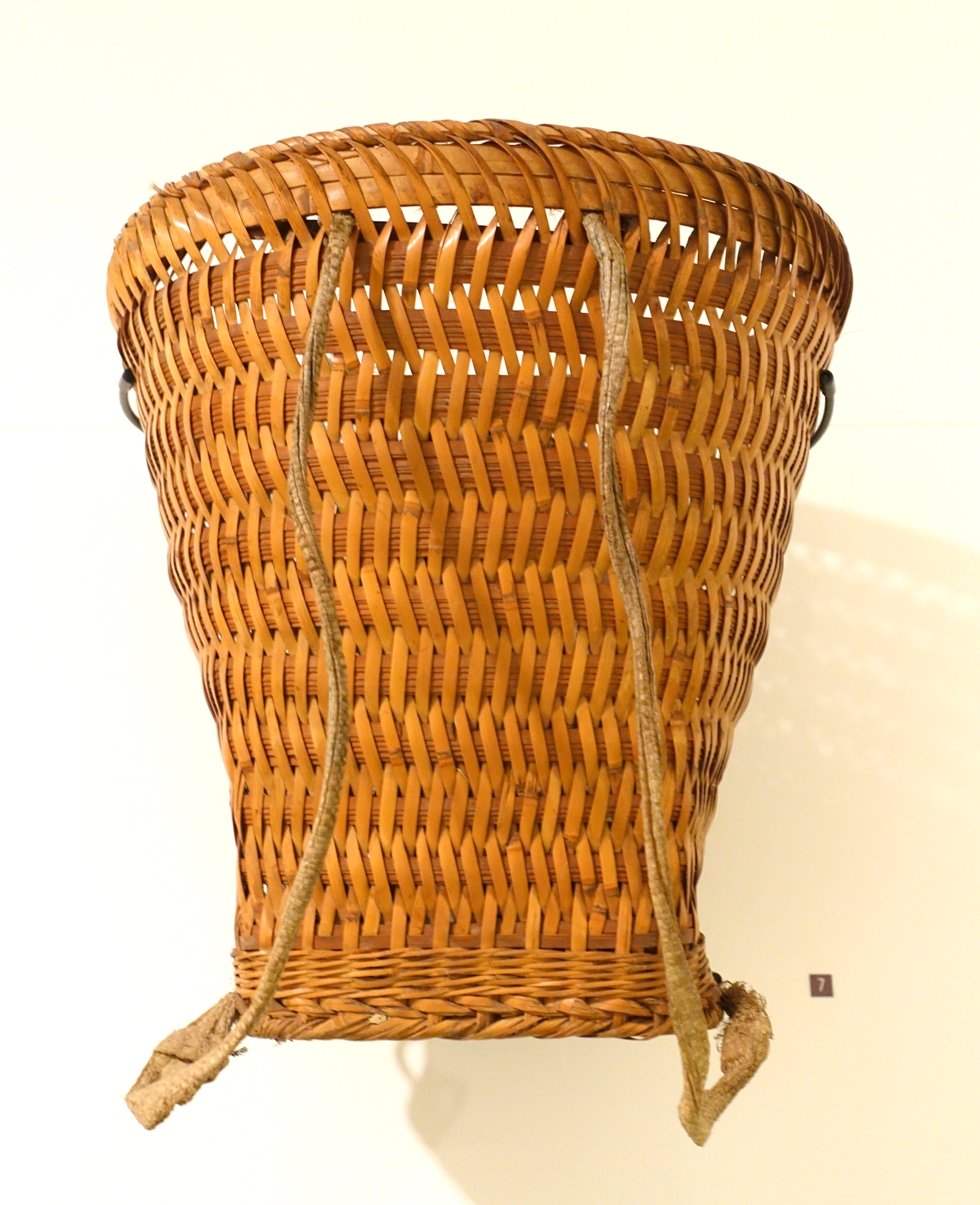
Hmong carrying basket (RPA: kawm; Pahawh: 𖬎𖬰)

Hmong carrying baskets, known as kawm in the Hmong language RPA, were traditionally used to transport farming goods or as general containers and were hand-made using available materials like bamboo and rattan (a type of tree palm). Basket weaving as a Hmong textile art is unique in that it is often produced by men. Although scholarship is limited in terms of Hmong basketry, examples can often be seen on display in folk art museums or depicted in Hmong story cloths.

=== Batik ===
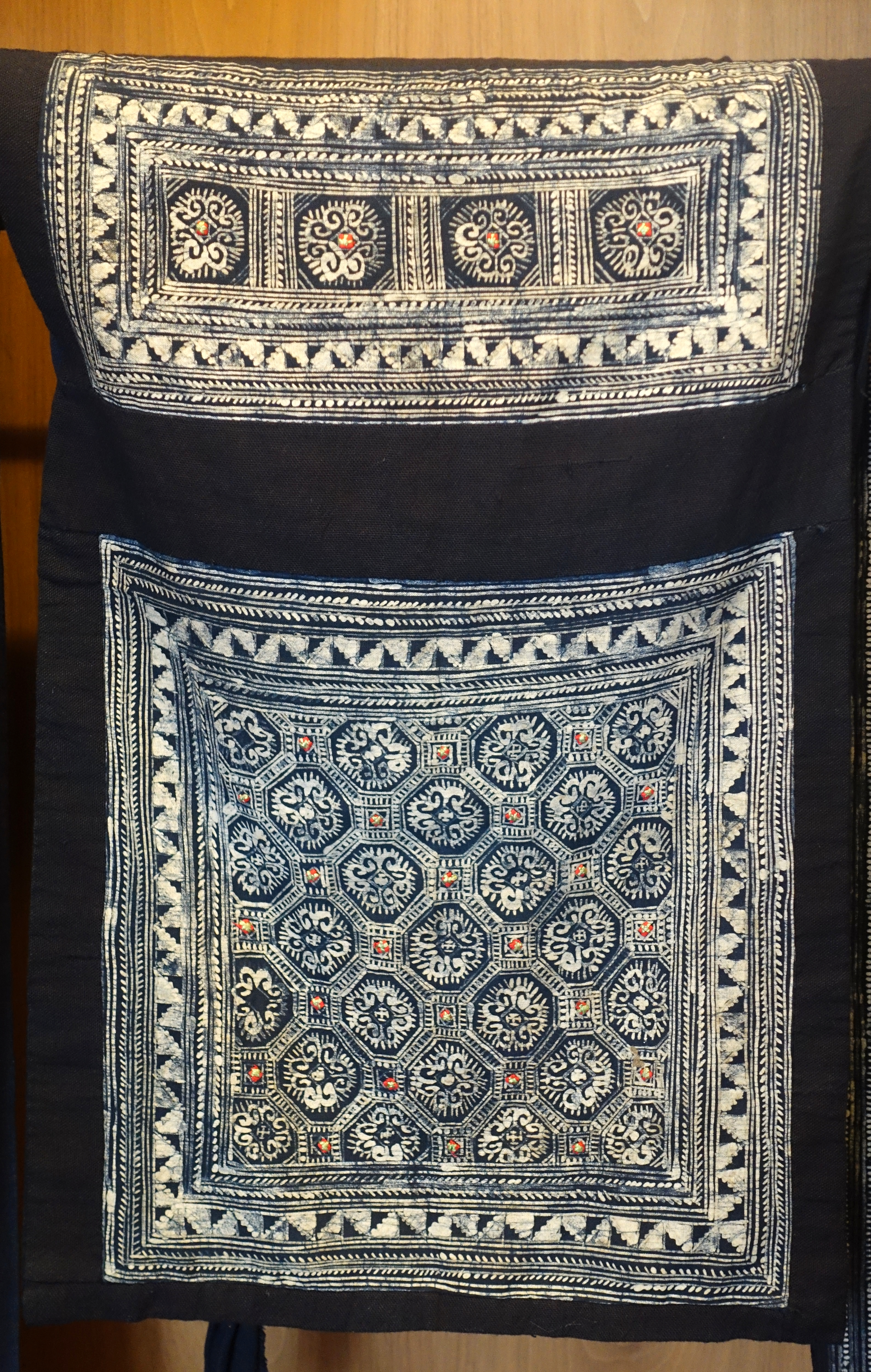
Batik-dyed cloth

Batik is a resist-dyeing technique in which hot wax is applied to cloth to create a pattern. The cloth is then dyed, typically using a single color (traditionally indigo), and the wax is removed. The waxed areas of the cloth resist the dye and the desired pattern remains.

Traditional Hmong batik, known as Paj Ntaub nraj ciab/cab in the Hmong language RPA, is created using white hemp fabric, beeswax, indigo dye, and a tjanting tool. Aesthetically, Hmong batik is similar to other Hmong visual design and often features bold and contrasting geometric designs. These designs are achieved by holding the handle of the tjanting tool with the copper nib positioned closer to the wrist which allows straight strokes to be drawn. To reveal the designs, the fabric is soaked in indigo dye several times and left to dry before being boiled in water to melt off the wax. This technique is utilized by Blue and Green Hmong to decorate skirts, baby carriers, and other typical Hmong textiles but is not seen amongst White Hmong.

== Paj Ntaub or Flower cloth ==
Paj Ntaub or flower cloth is a traditional form of Hmong embroidery practiced exclusively by women. This unique form of embroidery utilizes a wide variety of stitching techniques such as cross-stitch, chain-stitch, running-stitch, and satin-stitch and often features applique, reverse-applique, and batik elements in the design. Aesthetically, traditional Paj Ntaub is composed of highly stylized, non-representational geometric motifs that are developed both collectively and individually and vary according to region and tribe. These designs are often used to decorate traditional Hmong clothing including skirts, head dresses, shirt collars, and sashes worn by both men and women and other textiles such as baby carriers, pillows, and funerary textiles.

=== Death and religion ===
In traditional Hmong culture, the women prepare traditional funeral textiles adorned with Paj Ntaub for their close relatives such as their parents, in-laws, and spouse. This is typically done well in advance of their relatives' death and are gifted to them as a token of filial endearment. These special textiles consist of a funeral robe, known as a tsho laus or khaub ncaws laus, a large sailor collar called a dab tsho laus attached to the back of a White Hmong woman's funeral robe, a funerary pillow square called a noob ncoos for the Blue and Green Hmong, and a pair of slippers called khau noog in the Hmong language RPA.

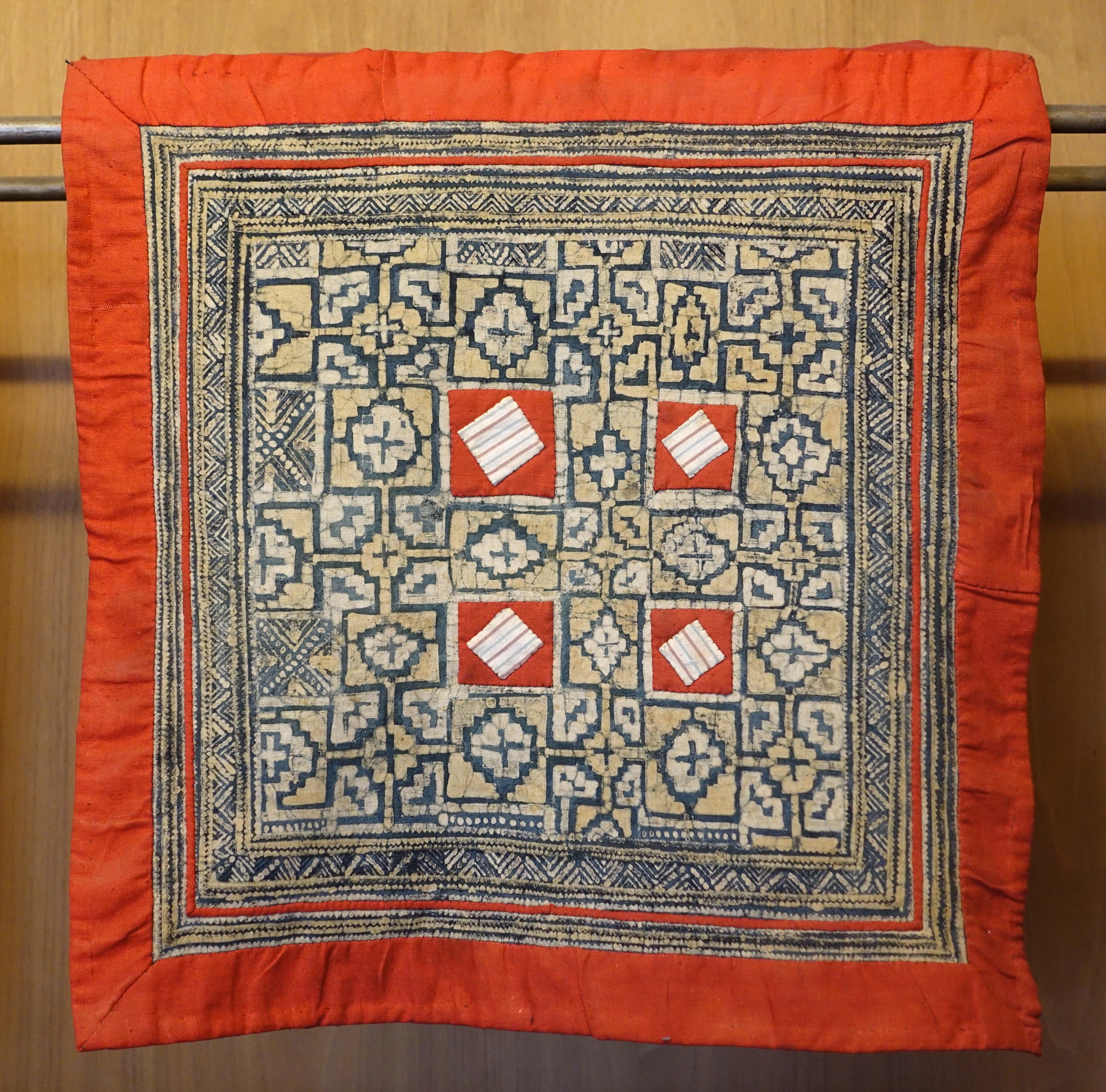
Paj Ntaub funerary pillow

It is believed in traditional Hmong culture that dressing the deceased in these Paj Ntaub textiles will allow them to join and be recognized by their deceased ancestors in the spirit world. The symbolic meaning behind specific motifs and patterns seen on funeral textiles have a variety of interpretations, however, conventions are generally held about the size, cut, and colors used for them by each Hmong clan or subgroup. Regardless of these diverse interpretations, the textiles are used very practically to care for the body of the deceased. For example, in the White Hmong funeral tradition, the large sailor collar known as a dab tsho laus is sometimes used to support the head of the deceased while transporting the body to the burial site. In the Blue and Green Hmong funeral tradition, the funerary pillow square, known as a noob ncoos, acts as a cushion for the head of the deceased.

=== Gender and Paj Ntaub ===
According to tradition, Hmong girls begin to learn the skills required to produce Paj Ntaub from their mother, grandmother, or older sister as early as three years old and go on to master hundreds of complex patterns. Skill in Paj Ntaub is highly valued in traditional Hmong culture and is used to signify desirable feminine traits like industriousness, creativity, and discipline and often plays a significant role in terms of courtship and marriage prospects. The creativity and skill of Paj Ntaub design was also traditionally linked with the embroiderer's own fertility. When Hmong women get married and join their husband's household, they learn and adopt the new Paj Ntaub techniques and traditions of their husband's clan from their mother-in-law and other female relatives. In doing so, the Paj Ntaub tradition of that clan is maintained.

Although the labor intensive production and decoration of Hmong clothing and Paj Ntaub were the exclusive responsibility of women and older girls, this did not release them from other extensive responsibilities involving domestic chores, child care, and farm work. Because of this, sewing would often be done late into the night or during breaks between other responsibilities.

Outside of the traditions, families will profit from the paj ntaub by making traditional or contemporary pieces. These pieces will then be sold at the Hmong New Year which occurs in late October through December.

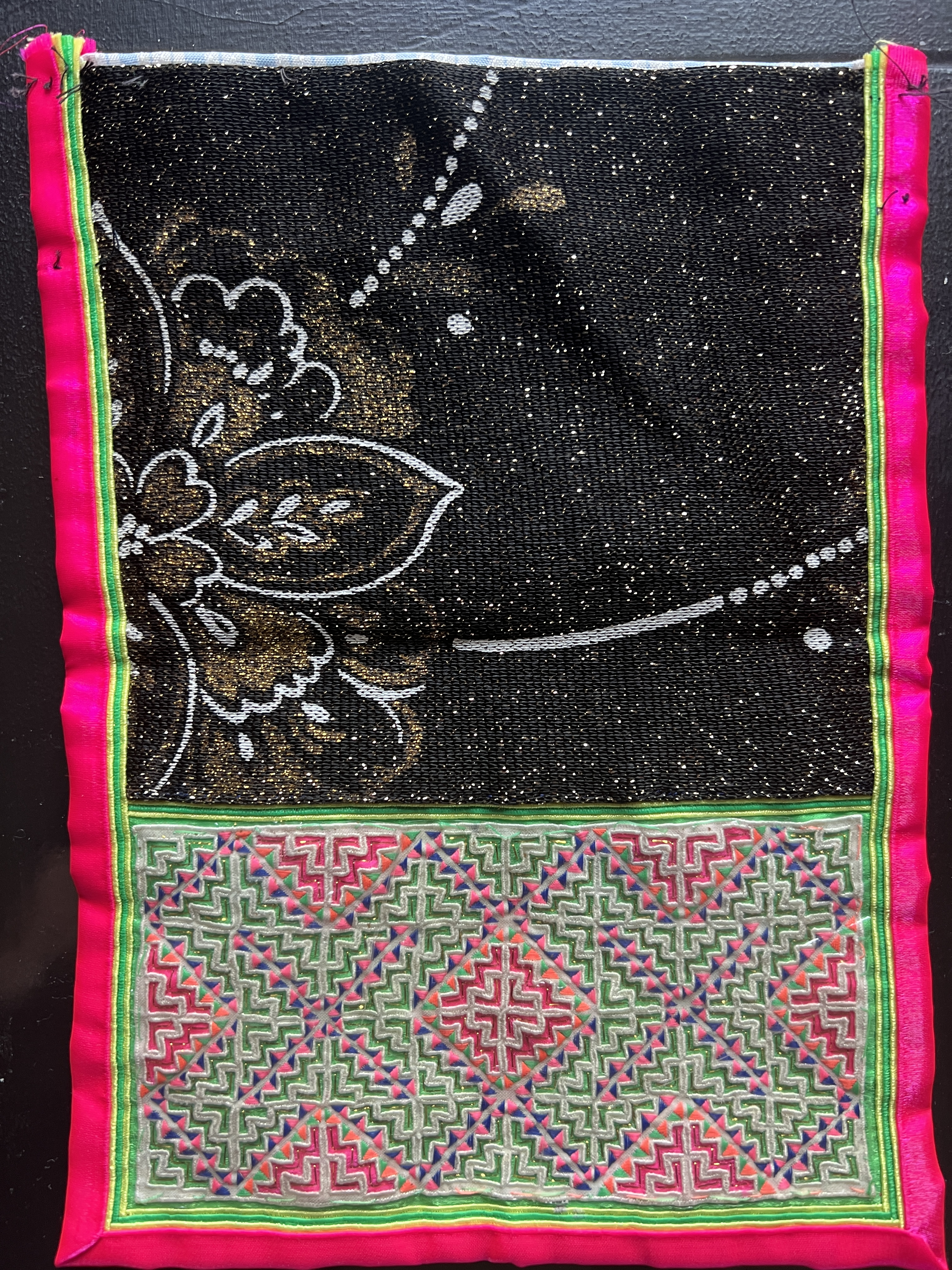
A White Hmong woman's sailor collar known as a dab tsho.

=== Symbolism and Language ===
Paj Ntaub is often highly symbolic and the colorful, geometric designs function in a multitude of ways including as abstract representation, religious talisman, group identification, and many argue as a codified visual language. Historically, the Hmong people were a primarily oral culture until the development of the Hmong RPA in the 1950s. According to popular legend however, the Hmong long ago had a powerful written language that was outlawed and destroyed by Chinese rulers and lost to time. As a result of this loss, the Hmong then codified their language and hid words as symbols in the Paj Ntaub designs sewn into the folds of skirts. Many scholars and researchers have attempted to decode the symbolism behind Paj Ntaub motifs, however, there is no consensus on a singular meaning behind any of the motifs because there are a variety of different names and interpretations attributed to them throughout the Hmong diaspora.

Although Paj Ntaub should not be understood strictly as a visual alphabet, many examples and interpretations of codified symbolism in Paj Ntaub exist. One example of this codified symbolism can be found in the Hmong cross, which appear in the form of singular or combined cross stitches, used in Paj Ntaub to decorate the White Hmong women's sailor collar on the back of her shirt called a dab tsho in the Hmong language RPA. An interpretation of this cross symbol is that it acts as a protective talisman for the back, which is considered the most vulnerable part of the body, against malevolent spirits. Other interpretations argue that the crosses don't inherently hold symbolic value but instead work together to form a larger Paj Ntaub design that, from afar, resembles eyes and can fool malevolent spirits into thinking that there are always a pair of eyes watching from the back.

== Story cloth ==
Hmong story cloth

The most well-known form of modern Hmong embroidery is the story cloth. Hmong story cloths are often referred to as a form of Paj Ntaub but are aesthetically unique in the Hmong tradition in that they strongly feature elements of figurative representation and fragments of text (often in English) as well as more traditional geometric motifs and abstract symbolism. These distinct and creative embroideries are designed to present a legible narrative and the earliest examples tended to focus on refugee life, military occupation, and forced migration from Laos. Other examples depict popular Hmong folktales, creation stories, and historical accounts of traditional Hmong life and culture.

=== Origins ===
By most accounts, the first story cloths began to appear in the 1970s and were produced by Hmong women in refugee camps in Thailand and Laos. The precise origin of the story cloth and the rationale behind why Hmong women begin to deviate from the traditional geometric abstractions of Paj Ntaub is unclear. Scholarship has suggested several possible competing theories including the suggestion that refugee aid workers originally encouraged the idea of making embroidered pictures to sell, or that the story cloths developed organically out of exposure to English-language illustrated textbooks and Chinese pattern books, or that the story cloths were a means to remember and communicate traditions and experiences often relating directly to the Secret War and leaving Laos. Regardless, some level of western influence is clearly present in the form of English text and it is widely known that the story cloths were sold to international audiences, often with the help of missionaries and refugee aid workers.

=== Usage and significance ===
Although most story cloths seem to be created for international export and tourist consumption, many western scholars and young Hmong-Americans have found them to be highly valuable as teaching and learning devices and cultural artifacts. Today, Hmong story cloths often serve as a primary source that connects the diasporic Hmong community to its past, preserves and evolves traditional elements of Paj Ntaub, and helps raise global awareness to the experience and treatment of the Hmong during the Secret War and beyond.

== See also ==
- Hmong customs and culture
- Hmong people
