= Hmong churches =

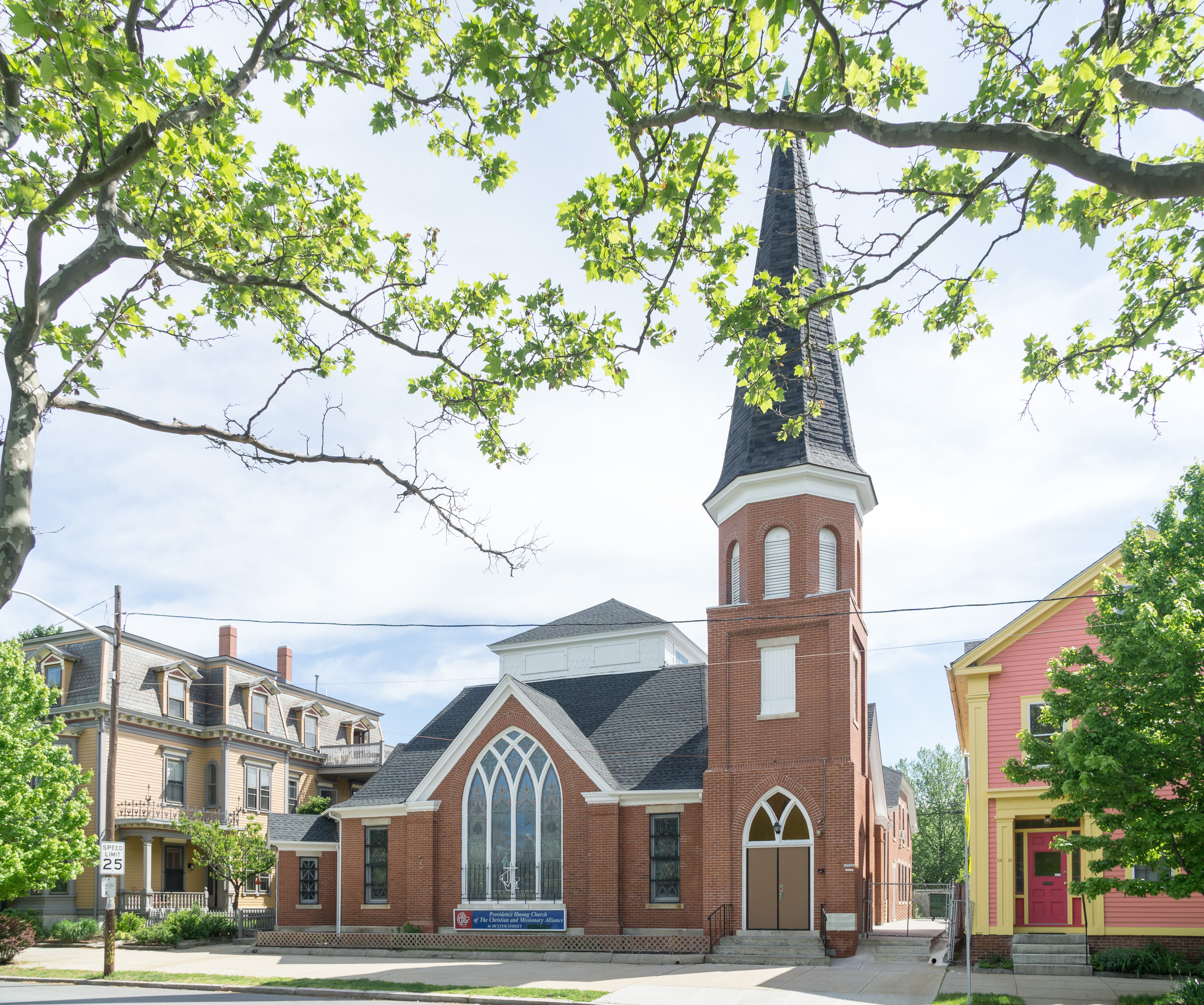
Providence (Rhode Island) Hmong Church of the Christian and Missionary Alliance

Hmong Churches are churches of the China-based Hmong people. Hmong Churches tend to be Renewal churches.

== History ==
The first missionaries to Laos were from the Netherlands. At that time, Laos was a French protectorate within French Indochina, governed by King Souligna Vongsa. In 1947, Rev. Ted Andrianoff and his wife sailed from New York to Laos to do missionary work for the Christian and Missionary Alliance. The majority of the people who converted to Christianity at that time were the Khmu and the Hmong people who spoke Green Hmong. They accepted their first convert in 1950. By March 1951, 2,300 Laotian Hmong had converted to Christianity; four years later the number was 5,000.

When Laos fell during the Vietnam War, thousands of Christian Hmong were evacuated and resettled in the United States.

== List of Hmong Church Organizations ==
- Alliance Churches of the Christian and Missionary Alliance https://www.hmongdistrict.org/
- Hmong Baptist National Association https://www.hbna.org/
- United Christians Liberty Evangelical
- Oroville Hmong Alliance Church
- Hmong Faith Alliance Church of La Crosse, WI
- Emmanuel Alliance Church of Galesville, WI
- Coon Rapids Hmong Alliance Church Coon Rapids, Minnesota

== See also ==
- Hmong folk religion
- Hmong Americans
- Hmong people
- Hmong customs and culture
- Kingdom of Laos
