= The Spirit Catches You and You Fall Down =

1997 book by Anne Fadiman

- Author: Anne Fadiman
- Language: English
- Publisher: Farrar, Straus and Giroux
- Publication date: 1997 and 1998
- Publication place: United States
- Media type: Print (Hardback & Paperback)
- Pages: 352
- ISBN: 978-0-374-52564-4
- OCLC: 47352453

The Spirit Catches You and You Fall Down: A Hmong Child, Her American Doctors, and the Collision of Two Cultures is a 1997 book by Anne Fadiman that chronicles the struggles of the Lees, a Hmong refugee family from Houaysouy, Sainyabuli province, Laos, and their interactions with the health care system in Merced, California. In 2005, Robert Entenmann of St. Olaf College wrote that the book is "certainly the most widely read book on the Hmong experience in America."

On the most basic level, the book tells the story of the family's second youngest and favored daughter, Lia Lee, who was diagnosed with a severe form of epilepsy named Lennox–Gastaut syndrome, and the cultural conflict that obstructed her treatment.

Miscommunications about medication dosages and parental refusal to administer certain medicines due to mistrust, misunderstandings, and behavioral side effects of epilepsy treatment, along with the failure of healthcare professionals to develop greater empathy for the traditional Hmong lifestyle or to better understand Hmong culture, lead to a deterioration in Lia's condition. The contrast between the Lees' perceived spiritual explanations for Lia's condition and the American healthcare professionals' reliance on scientific reasoning forms the overarching theme of the book.

The book is written in a distinctive style, with every other chapter returning to Lia's story and the chapters in between discussing broader themes of Hmong culture, customs, and history; American involvement in and responsibility for the war in Laos; and the many problems of immigration, especially assimilation and discrimination. While particularly sympathetic to the Hmong, Fadiman presents the situation from the perspectives of both the doctors and the family. An example of medical anthropology, the book has been cited by medical journals and lecturers as an argument for greater cultural competence, and is often assigned to medical, pharmaceutical, and anthropological students in the US. In 1997, it won the National Book Critics Circle Award for General Nonfiction.

== Major characters ==
Lia Lee (Romanized Popular Alphabet: Liab Lis, July 19, 1982 – August 31, 2012): a Hmong child born in Merced, California, in 1982. Beginning in infancy, Lia experiences severe seizures due to Lennox–Gastaut syndrome, a rare form of epilepsy.

Anne Fadiman: author and narrator of The Spirit Catches You and You Fall Down, writing about her experience with Lia and her family. Throughout the story, she stresses the importance of cultural competence in the doctor–patient relationship (and in the greater medical establishment).

Neil Ernst and Peggy Philp: Lia's primary care doctors at MCMC. Throughout the story, they clash with Lia's parents, whose adherence to Hmong shamanism conflicts deeply with their own beliefs about Western medicine. Despite the good intentions of Ernst, Philp, and Lia's parents, significant miscommunication and disagreement cause Lia permanent harm.

Foua Yang and Nao Kao Lee: Lia's parents who seek care for their daughter with complex medical needs, while navigating a foreign and unfamiliar medical system without language fluency and cultural familiarity

Jeanine Hilt: a social worker who makes Lia her personal cause and fights on Lia's behalf. She is presented as one of the few members of the American medical establishment willing to acknowledge Hmong tradition and tailor treatment to Lia's case.

== Summary ==
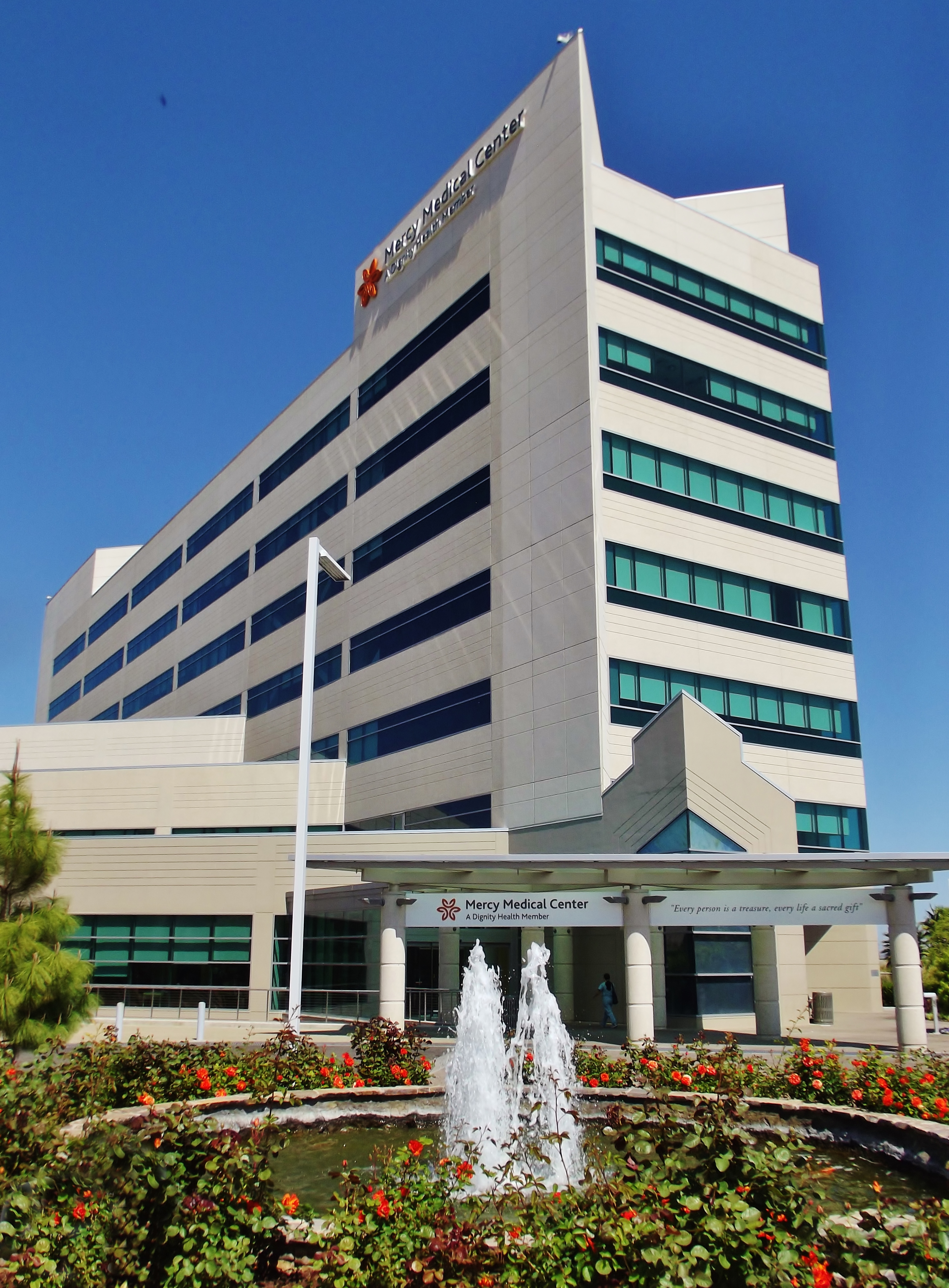
Mercy Medical Center Merced, previously the Merced Community Medical Center; is a new building and not the previous building where Lia Lee was taken.

Lia experienced her first seizure at three months of age, but a resident at Merced Community Medical Center misdiagnosed her condition, and the hospital was unable to communicate with her parents since the hospital had no Hmong interpreters. Anne Fadiman wrote that Lia's parents did not give her medication as it was prescribed because they believed that Lia Lee's state showed a sense of spiritual giftedness, and they did not want to take that away. The American doctors did not understand the Hmong traditional remedies that the Lee family used. The doctors treating Lia Lee, Neil and Peggy Ernst, had her removed from her home when she was almost three years of age, and placed into foster care for one year, causing friction with her parents. By age 4½ Lia Lee had been admitted to hospital care 17 times and had made over 100 outpatient visits.

The worst seizure Lia had put her on the verge of death. She went to the emergency room and Neil Ernst could not do anything. He talked to Lia's parents about transferring her to Fresno, California, because Lia would need further treatment that Ernst could not provide. Lia's parents believed their daughter was transferred because of Ernst's vacation plans.

Lia slipped into a coma after suffering from a tonic–clonic seizure in 1986 when she was four years old. Lia's doctors believed she would die, but Lia remained alive with no higher brain functions.

== Research ==
Fadiman's sources for information about the history of the Hmong include Hmong: History of a People by Keith Quincy. She stated "Were I citing the source of each detail, Quincy's name would attach itself to nearly every sentence in the pages on the Hmong in China." Fadiman's book cited the Quincy theory that the Hmong people originated from Siberia. Robert Entenmann wrote that because of the reliance on Quincy's book, Fadiman's book propagates the idea that Sonom was a Hmong king, a concept that Entenmann says is inaccurate.

== Legacy ==
Marilyn Mochel, a nurse and clinical educator at Sutter Merced Medical Center (now Mercy Medical Center Merced), who heads the hospital's cross-cultural program, said in 1999 that "The book has allowed more dialogue. There's certainly more awareness and dialogue than before. Both sides are teachers and learners."

Lia Lee lived in a persistent vegetative state for 26 years. She died in Sacramento, California, on August 31, 2012, at the age of 30. At that age she weighed 47 pounds (21 kg) and was 4 feet 7 inches (1.40 m) tall; many people with severe brain damage have limited growth as they age. Outside of California, her death was not widely reported. Fadiman said that pneumonia was the immediate cause of death. Margalit Fox of The New York Times said that "Lia's underlying medical issues were more complex" because she had lived in a persistent vegetative state for such a long period of time. As of 2012, most individuals in persistent vegetative states die within three to five years of the onset.

In 2019, The Spirit Catches You and You Fall Down was ranked by Slate as one of the 50 greatest nonfiction works of the past 25 years.

== Reception ==
Hmong reactions to the book were mixed. Ralph Jennings of The Modesto Bee said "Hmong, including some among the 2,000 in Modesto, say the book typified conflicts between their culture and American institutions. But some say it didn't capture the complexity of the Hmong culture." Cheng Lee, a brother of Lia Lee, said that his father and mother liked Fadiman's book.

Anne Fadiman's essay "Hmong Odyssey", adapted from the book, was published in the March–April 1998 Via. The Hmong community leaders in Fresno, California, praised the essay, saying that it was thoughtful and accurate.

== See also ==
- History of the Hmong in Merced, California
