= Hmong Archives =

Nonprofit organization

The Hmong Archives, formerly known as Hmong Nationality Archives, is a nonprofit organization located in Saint Paul, Minnesota, United States with the mission to research, collect, preserve, interpret, and disseminate materials in all formats about or by Hmong.

The Hmong Archives was founded by Yuepheng Xiong (founder of Hmong ABC), Tzianeng Vang (founder of Hmong Professional Network), Marlin LeRoy Heise (Minnesota Historical Society retiree, chief volunteer), and other Hmong professionals in February 1999. It was first housed at Metropolitan State University in Saint Paul. It later relocated to a Hmong business strip in the "Minnehaha Mall", the Hmong Archives then found its way to the Center of Hmong Studies at Concordia University, Saint Paul. Overcrowding led the organization in May 2008 to 298½ University Avenue West, Saint Paul, MN, above the Hmong ABC (Arts, Books & Crafts) store. Since December 2010 Hmong Archives had relocated to 343 Michigan Street, Saint Paul, MN, with collections at 1105 Greenbrier Street (East Side Freedom Library) since 2015. Regular office hours are Wednesdays from 10 a.m. to 4 p.m. at 1105 Greenbrier and almost anytime at 343 Michigan Street.

Collections range from rare Hmong record albums to Hmong embroidery, Hmong children's drawings, videos and books in over a dozen languages. As of December 2024, over 255,000 items had been accessioned, with special emphasis on collecting outdated Hmong audios and videos.

Current staff are volunteers.
