= Anne Fadiman =

American essayist, journalist and magazine editor

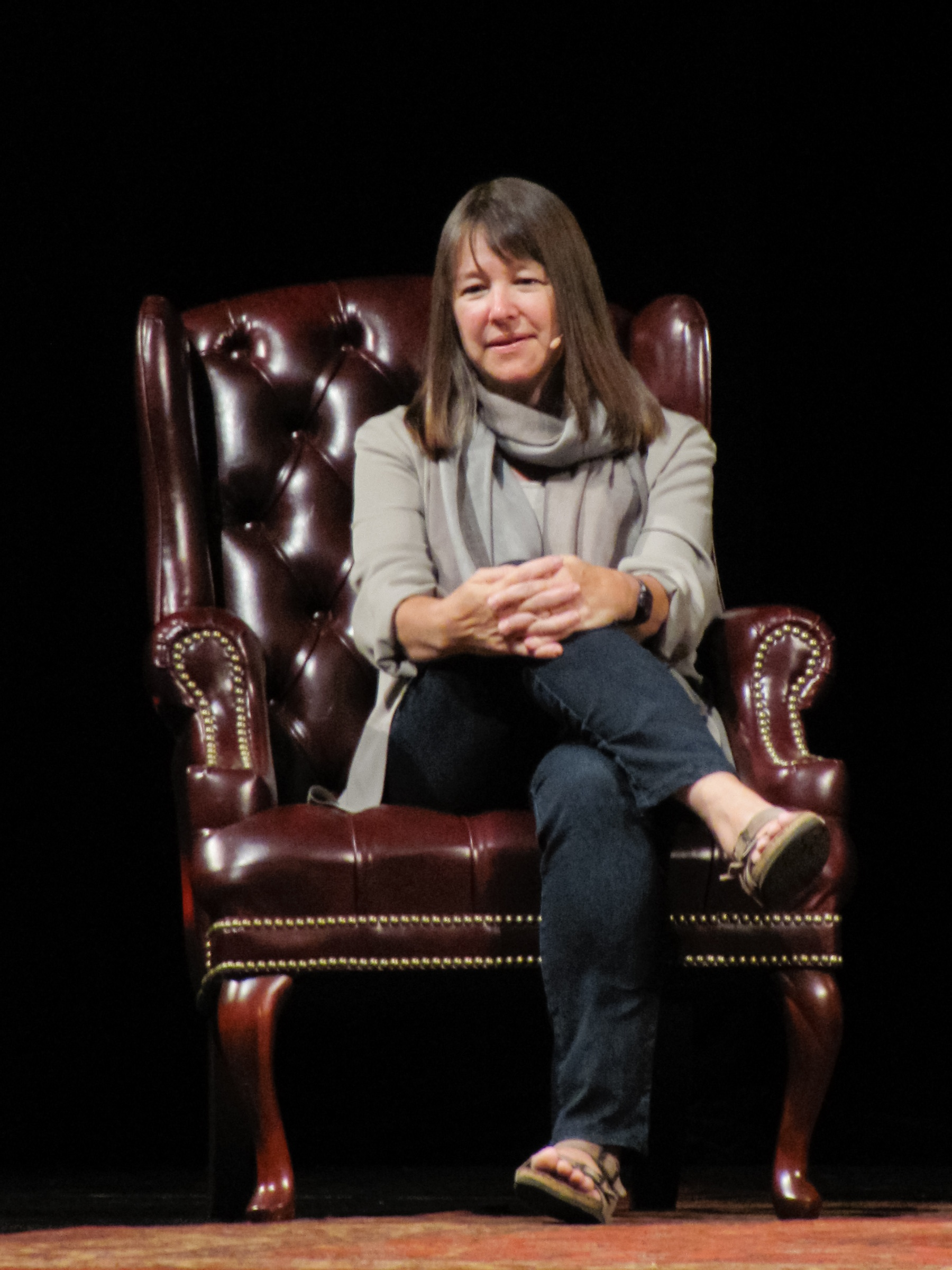
- Fadiman in September 2010
- Born: August 7, 1953 (age 73); New York City, US
- Education: Harvard University
- Occupation: Writer
- Employer: Yale University
- Spouse: George Howe Colt
- Children: 2
- Parent(s): Clifton Fadiman (father); Annalee Jacoby Fadiman (mother)
- Awards: National Book Critics Circle Award (1997)

Anne Fadiman (born August 7, 1953) is an American writer. She specializes in the genres literary journalism, essays, memoir, biography, and autobiography. She has received the National Book Critics Circle Award, the Los Angeles Times Book Prize for Current Interest, and the Salon Book Award. She also teaches writing at Yale University.

== Early life and education ==
Born to a Jewish family in New York City, she is the daughter of Clifton Fadiman, who was active in the literary, radio, and television worlds, and Annalee Jacoby Fadiman, a World War II correspondent and author.

She attended Harvard University, graduating in 1975 from Radcliffe College with a bachelor of arts degree.

== Career ==
=== Writing ===
Fadiman's 1997 nonfiction book The Spirit Catches You and You Fall Down: A Hmong Child, Her American Doctors, and the Collision of Two Cultures won the 1997 National Book Critics Circle Award, the Los Angeles Times Book Prize for Current Interest, and the Salon Book Award. She conducted research in a small county hospital in California, and examined the cultural and medical issues of a Hmong family from Laos who had a child with epilepsy. Their efforts to get treatment for the child were constrained by cultural, linguistic, and medical differences as well as limitations of the American medical system. Their culture had a different explanation for epilepsy.

She has also published three books of essays. The first, Ex Libris: Confessions of a Common Reader, was published in 1998. At Large and At Small: Familiar Essays (2007) touches on such topics as Arctic explorers, Samuel Taylor Coleridge, and ice cream. Frog (2026) covers a deceased frog, archaic printer, and a small magazine in the Arctic, among other topics.

She edited Rereadings: Seventeen Writers Revisit Books They Love (2005) and the Best American Essays 2003.

Fadiman has also published a memoir about her relationship with her father, The Wine Lover's Daughter (2017).

=== Editing ===
Fadiman was a founding editor of the Library of Congress magazine Civilization.

She was the fourth editor of the Phi Beta Kappa quarterly The American Scholar, starting in 1997. Under her direction, it won three National Magazine Awards in six years. She left The American Scholar in 2004; she was paid an annual salary of $60,000, and was in the midst of a dispute over budgetary issues. At the time of her departure, the journal faced a budget deficit of about $250,000; its circulation was about 28,000.

=== Teaching ===
Since January 2005, in a program established by Yale alumnus Paul E. Francis, Fadiman has been Yale University's first Francis Writer in Residence, a position that allows her to teach one or two non-fiction writing seminars each year, and advise, mentor, and interact with students and editors of undergraduate publications.

In 2012 she received the Richard H. Brodhead '68 Prize for Teaching Excellence by Non-Ladder Faculty.

== Personal life ==
Fadiman is married to American author George Howe Colt. They have two children.

== Works ==
=== Author ===
- The Spirit Catches You and You Fall Down: A Hmong Child, Her American Doctors, and the Collision of Two Cultures (1997)
- Ex Libris: Confessions of a Common Reader (1998)
- At Large and At Small: Familiar Essays (2007)
- The Wine Lover's Daughter (2017)
- Frog and Other Essays (2026)

=== Editor ===
- Best American Essays 2003 (2003)
- Rereadings: Seventeen Writers Revisit Books They Love (2005)
