= Mark Speckman =

American gridiron football player and coach (born 1955)

Current position
- Title: Offensive coordinator
- Team: Azusa Pacific
- Conference: SCIAC

Biographical details
- Born: July 31, 1955 (age 71); Belmont, California, U.S.

Playing career
- ?: Menlo
- ?–1976: Azusa Pacific
- Position: Linebacker

Coaching career (HC unless noted)
- 1981–1982: Livingston HS (CA)
- 1983–1985: Gilroy HS (CA)
- 1986–1993: Merced HS (CA)
- 1994: Golden Valley HS (CA)
- 1995–1997: Willamette (OC)
- 1998–2011: Willamette
- 2012: Menlo
- 2013–2014: Montreal Alouettes (RB)
- 2015–2016: Lawrence (OC)
- 2017–2021: UC Davis (AHC/RB)
- 2022–2024: Clarion (OC)
- 2026–present: Azusa Pacific (OC)

Head coaching record
- Overall: 86–65 (college); 113–48–3 (high school)
- Tournaments: 1–3 (NCAA D-III playoffs)

Accomplishments and honors

Championships
- 2 NWC (1999, 2008)

Awards
- 2× NWC Coach of the Year (1999, 2008)

Mark Joseph Speckman (born July 31, 1955) is an American professional football coach and former player. He is the offensive coordinator for Azusa Pacific University, a position he has held since 2026. Speckman was as the head football coach at Willamette University from 1998 to 2011 and at Menlo College in 2012. As coach of the Willamette Bearcats, he led his team to three playoff berths at the NCAA Division III level. He was the running backs coach of the Montreal Alouettes of the Canadian Football League (CFL) in 2013 and 2014 and the offensive coordinator at Lawrence University in Appleton, Wisconsin from 2015 to 2016. A California native, he was born without hands and played football at the college level. Speckman also works as a motivational speaker.

== Early life ==
Speckman was born to Don and Jan Speckman. He grew up south of San Francisco, in Belmont, as the second child of four. Born without hands, he wore hooks until the age of 15, earning him the nickname of Captain Hook. He convinced his parents that the hooks were not needed, and has never used them since.

After starring as a linebacker in high school, Speckman played football for Menlo College, a junior college where he was a starter. He then went on to Azusa Pacific University, playing at the NAIA level. There he earned an honorable mention for All-American at the NAIA classification in 1976, and attention from the tabloid media as the Handless Linebacker.

== Coaching career ==
Speckman took up coaching football after his playing career, first at the high school level. His first head coaching gig was at Livingston High School in Livingston, California in 1981, where he introduced the famous Fly offense that is primarily a run-based offense; the fullback and tailback are split behind the quarterback, while the Fly back runs in motion almost every play. His 1982 Wolfpack squad won a share of the Golden Valley League title, missing the Sac-Joaquin Section Division II playoffs by a coin flip. Speckman was picked to coach the 1983 Lions All-Star Football Game, one of many he coached in Central California from the early 1980s into the early 1990s. He left Livingston after two seasons to teach and become the head coach at Gilroy High School in Gilroy, California for the 1983 through 1985 seasons.

In 1986, Speckman returned to Central California as Merced High School's football head coach, a position he held for eight seasons. At Merced, he led those teams to six consecutive Central California Conference titles, including quite a few of those where his teams went undefeated in the CCC. In 1990, Speckman's Bears went 14–0 that earned them the mythical state Division I crown. His 1989 and 1990 squads won back-to-back Sac-Joaquin Section D-I titles, and played in six section championship games from 1988 to 1993. During his tenure, his teams received numerous state and national rankings. Speckman left Merced after the 1993 season to teach and start the new football program at Golden Valley High School, Merced's second high school. His high school coaching record was 113–48–3. He also worked as a teacher at that time. During 17 years of coaching high school, he also ran a program targeted at helping disadvantaged kids.

=== Willamette ===
In 1995, Willamette coach Dan Hawkins hired Speckman to serve as offensive coordinator and offensive line coach for the Bearcats. Willamette is a small liberal arts college in the Willamette Valley that competes at the NCAA Division III level. When Hawkins left the school to coach at Boise State University in Idaho, Willamette hired Speckman to serve as head coach of the team. In 1997, while Speckman was still offensive coordinator, Liz Heaston was one of the teams' kickers, and she became the first female player in college football history.

As Willamette's coach, he has implemented the Fly offense. Speckman is considered one of the top experts on that offense. The team has made the playoffs in 1999, 2004 and 2008. After the 1999 season, he was named coach of the year for the Northwest Conference. In 2004, The Oregonian named him one of the 25 most influential figures in sports in the state of Oregon, coming in at 24.

Speckman was considered as a possible replacement for Tim Walsh in early 2007 before Jerry Glanville was hired as the new head coach at Portland State University. In June 2007, Speckman was inducted into the San Mateo County, California, Sports Hall of Fame, and was a finalist for the Liberty Mutual Coach of the Year. In 2008, he led the team to a 10–0 regular season, a ranking as high as fourth in Division III, and a first round playoff win. The team lost in the second round of the playoffs to defending champion Wisconsin-Whitewater 30–27, and finished the year 11–1.

Speckman resigned as head coach at Willamette on January 11, 2012.

== Personal ==
Despite having no hands, Speckman does not let this handicap slow him down. He can still write, type, use a cell phone, drive, play racquetball and he played the trombone in high school. He uses these aspects of overcoming a handicap in motivational speeches around the state and country. Speckman and his wife, Sue, have three children, Julie, Lisa and Tim.

== Head coaching record ==
=== College ===
Year	Team	Overall	Conference	Standing	Bowl/playoffs
Willamette Bearcats (Northwest Conference) (1998–2011)
1998	Willamette	7–3	3–2	3rd	
1999	Willamette	7–4	5–0	1st	L NCAA Division III First Round
2000	Willamette	3–7	0–5	6th	
2001	Willamette	4–5	2–3	4th	
2002	Willamette	6–4	3–2	3rd	
2003	Willamette	7–3	4–1	2nd	
2004	Willamette	7–4	4–1	2nd	L NCAA Division III First Round
2005	Willamette	5–4	3–1	2nd	
2006	Willamette	2–7	2–4	5th	
2007	Willamette	4–6	3–3	4th	
2008	Willamette	11–1	6–0	1st	L NCAA Division III Second Round
2009	Willamette	8–2	5–1	2nd	
2010	Willamette	7–3	4–2	3rd	
2011	Willamette	4–6	3–3	T–4th	
Willamette:		82–59	47–28		
Menlo Oaks (NAIA independent) (2012)
2012	Menlo	4–6			
Menlo:		4–6			
Total:		86–65			
National championship Conference title Conference division title or championship game berth

== See also ==
- 8329 Speckman
