= Daulton Jefferies =

American baseball player (born 1995)

- Pitcher
- Born: August 2, 1995 (age 31); Merced, California, U.S.
- Batted: Left Threw: Right

MLB debut
- September 12, 2020, for the Oakland Athletics

Last MLB appearance
- July 5, 2024, for the Pittsburgh Pirates

MLB statistics
- Win–loss record: 2–10
- Earned run average: 6.59
- Strikeouts: 49
- Stats at Baseball Reference

Teams
- Oakland Athletics (2020–2022); San Francisco Giants (2024); Pittsburgh Pirates (2024)

Daulton Compton Jefferies (born August 2, 1995) is an American former professional baseball pitcher. He played in Major League Baseball (MLB) for the Oakland Athletics, San Francisco Giants, and Pittsburgh Pirates.

Jefferies played college baseball for the California Golden Bears and was selected by the Athletics with the 37th overall pick of the 2016 MLB draft. He made his MLB debut in 2020 and pitched for the Athletics through the 2022 season.

== Amateur career ==
Jefferies attended Buhach Colony High School in Atwater, California, where he played as a pitcher and shortstop. As a junior in high school, Jefferies was named the most valuable player award in the Central California Conference after pitching to a 8–0 win–loss record with a 1.26 earned run average and hitting to a .366/.480/.505 slash line. In Jefferies's senior season, he went 10–2 with a 0.92 earned run average and a school-record 142 strikeouts, again taking home the conference's Most Valuable Player award. Jefferies had initially verbally committed to play baseball for Stanford University during the summer of his junior year of high school, but the offer fell through and Jefferies committed to the University of California, Berkeley.

As a freshman for the California Golden Bears in 2014, Jefferies started 15 games, finishing the year 2–8 with a 3.45 earned run average and 58 strikeouts in a team-high 92 2/3 innings. Jefferies' sophomore season saw both his record and earned run average improve, as he appeared in 14 games, starting 13, and went 6–5 with a 2.92 earned run average, enough to warrant a First Team All-Pac-12 selection. The summer after his sophomore season, Jefferies was a member of the USA Baseball Collegiate National Team, and played collegiate summer baseball with the Wareham Gatemen of the Cape Cod Baseball League.

== Professional career ==
=== Oakland Athletics ===
Jefferies was drafted by the Oakland Athletics with the 37th overall pick of the 2016 Major League Baseball draft. He spent his first professional season with the AZL Athletics where he posted a 2.38 earned run average with 17 strikeouts in 11.1 innings pitched. He pitched in only two games for the Stockton Ports in 2017 before undergoing Tommy John surgery, thus ending his season. He appeared in one game in the AZL in 2018 as he continued to rehab his way back to full health. Jefferies split the 2019 season between Stockton and the Midland RockHounds, going a combined 2–2 with a 3.41 earned run average over 79 innings.

On November 20, 2019, the Athletics added Jefferies to their 40-man roster to protect him from the Rule 5 draft. Jefferies was called up as the extra man for a doubleheader on September 12, 2020, against the Texas Rangers. It was his major league debut but it did not go well as Jefferies only lasted two innings, giving up five runs on two home runs and taking the loss.

On May 20, 2022, Jefferies was diagnosed with thoracic outlet syndrome, and was sidelined indefinitely. On September 11, Jefferies underwent Tommy John surgery to repair UCL damage in his right elbow. The surgery prematurely ended his 2022 season, and wiped out his 2023 season as well. He was outrighted off the roster on November 14, 2022. Jefferies elected free agency on November 6, 2023.

=== San Francisco Giants ===
On December 8, 2023, Jefferies signed a minor league contract with the San Francisco Giants. On March 31, 2024, Jeffries had his contract selected to the active roster. In two appearances for San Francisco, he allowed 13 runs (9 earned) on 14 hits with four strikeouts across 4 2/3 innings. Jeffries was designated for assignment by the Giants following the promotion of Mason Black on May 6.

=== Pittsburgh Pirates ===
On May 10, 2024, Jefferies was traded to the Pittsburgh Pirates in exchange for Rodolfo Nolasco. In four appearances for Pittsburgh, he logged a 6.30 ERA with 8 strikeouts across 10 innings. Jefferies was placed on the injured list with right elbow inflammation on July 6, and was transferred to the 60–day injured list on July 30. On November 4, he was removed from the 40–man roster and sent outright to the minors. On November 6, he elected free agency.

== Pitching style ==
Jefferies has a four pitch repertoire. His fastball has a bit of sink and sits in the low-to-mid 90s, but can top out around 96 mph. His primary off-speed pitch is his changeup which he throws in the mid-80s with good sink and fade. He also has a decent slider and a good three-quarters curveball.

== Personal life ==
Jefferies is the nephew of former major league pitcher Blas Minor, and his older brother Jake was a catcher in the minor leagues for both the Miami Marlins' and Tampa Bay Rays' organizations.

His fiancee is Natalie Kienhofer.
