= Doug Fister =

American baseball player (born 1984)

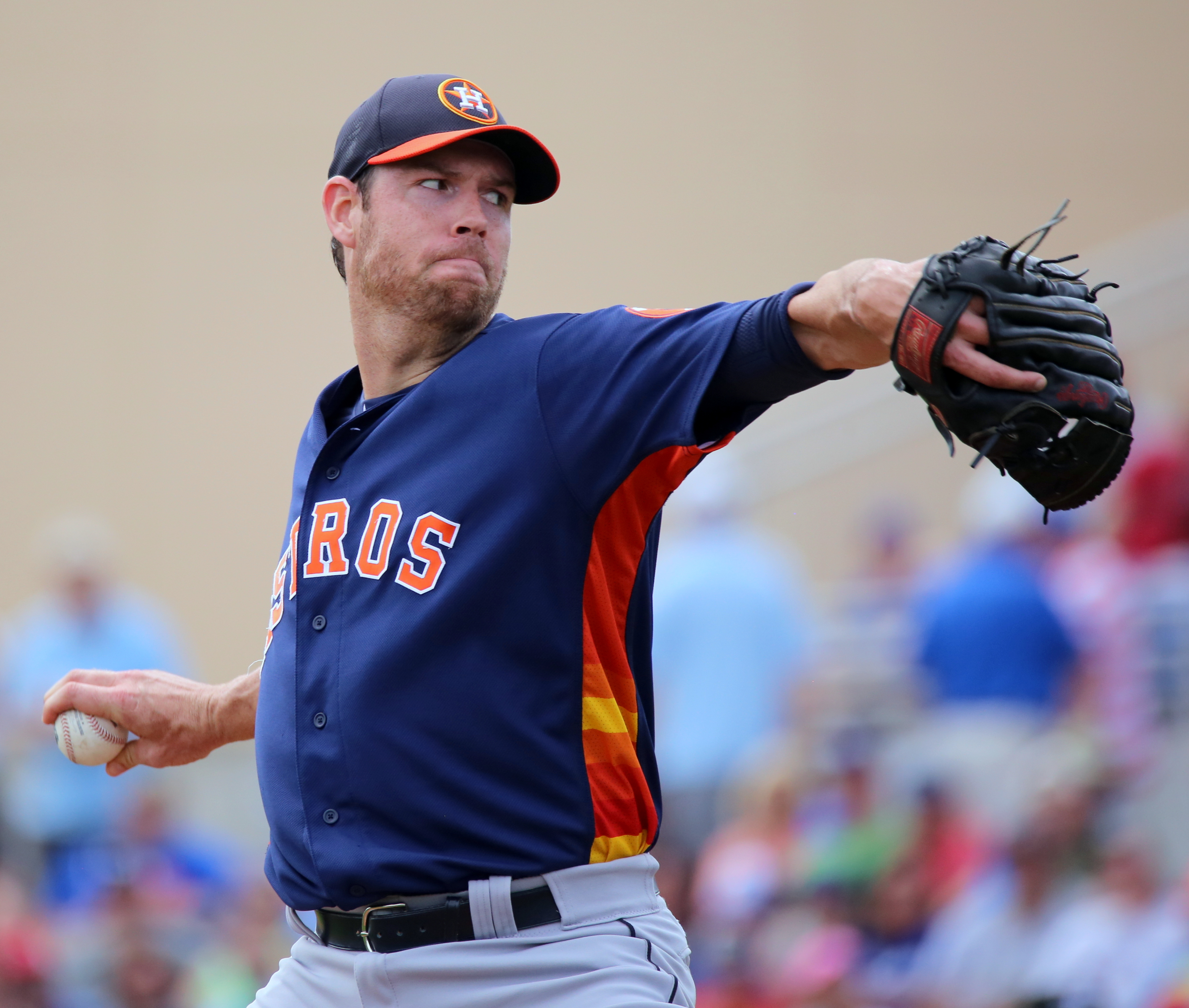
- Fister with the Houston Astros
- Pitcher
- Born: February 4, 1984 (age 42); Merced, California, U.S.
- Batted: Left Threw: Right

MLB debut
- August 8, 2009, for the Seattle Mariners

Last MLB appearance
- June 8, 2018, for the Texas Rangers

MLB statistics
- Win–loss record: 83–92
- Earned run average: 3.72
- Strikeouts: 970
- Stats at Baseball Reference

Teams
- Seattle Mariners (2009–2011); Detroit Tigers (2011–2013); Washington Nationals (2014–2015); Houston Astros (2016); Boston Red Sox (2017); Texas Rangers (2018)

Douglas Wildes Fister (born February 4, 1984) is an American former professional baseball pitcher. He played in Major League Baseball (MLB) for the Seattle Mariners, Detroit Tigers, Washington Nationals, Houston Astros, Boston Red Sox, and Texas Rangers from 2009 through 2018.

Fister was born in Merced, California and attended Golden Valley High School. He then attended Merced College, and later Fresno State University. He spent four seasons (2006–2009) in the Seattle Mariners minor league organization before being promoted to the majors. Fister pitched in the 2012 World Series for Detroit and started 9 postseason games

== Early life ==
Fister was born February 4, 1984. His father is a fire captain who played football at Fresno State University from 1976 to 1977. His mother is a homemaker. Fister has three siblings. He grew up in Merced, California and began playing baseball at age six.

He was a fan of both the Oakland Athletics and San Francisco Giants as a child. His favorite player was Cal Ripken Jr. Fister also played soccer, football, and basketball as a child.

== Amateur career ==
=== High school ===
Fister attended Golden Valley High School where he pitched and was the team's utility player. He was a two-year letterman and a first-team All-Central California Conference selection in his senior season, batting .456 with a home run and 12 runs batted in (RBIs). He was also named a first team all-conference selection in basketball, averaging over 30 points per game as a senior. He and former MLB catcher Dusty Ryan graduated in the same class.

=== College ===
Fister attended Merced College from 2003 to 2004. At Merced, he was a two-year letterman and participated in the 2003 Junior College All-Star Game. In 2003, he was a preseason All-American. Fister was drafted by the San Francisco Giants in the 49th round of the 2004 Major League Baseball draft but chose to transfer to Division I Fresno State University, where he played for the Bulldogs. In 2005, Fister led Fresno State with wins (7) and was second in innings pitched (93 2/3) and strikeouts (77). He also appeared in 26 games at first base in 2005. That season, he was drafted by the New York Yankees in the sixth round but chose to stay at Fresno State for his senior season. In 2006, Fister had an 8–6 record and a 4.10 earned run average in 20 games.

== Professional career ==
=== Seattle Mariners ===
==== 2006–2007 ====
The Seattle Mariners selected Fister in the seventh round of the 2006 Major League Baseball draft, and he signed on June 10, 2006. He began his professional career that season with the Class-A Short-Season Everett AquaSox of the Northwest League. Fister went 3–5 with a 2.25 ERA, four saves, and 35 strikeouts in 20 games, four of them starts. He led the AquaSox in games finished (13) and ERA, tied for second in saves and wins, and was third among pitchers in games played (20). The next season, 2007, Fister played with the Double-A West Tenn Diamond Jaxx of the Southern League. He went 7–8 with a 4.60 ERA, one complete game, and 85 strikeouts in 24 games, all starts. Fister led the Diamond Jaxx in wins and home runs allowed (14), tied for first in complete games, was second in hits allowed (156), and was third in losses, games started, innings pitched (131), runs allowed (78), and earned runs allowed (67).

==== 2008 season ====
Fister returned to the Diamond Jaxx in 2008. On April 23, he was named the Southern League Pitcher of the Week. Fister became the Southern League's first 10-game loser on July 10. On the season, Fister went 6–14 with a 5.43 ERA, and 104 strikeouts in 31 games; 23 starts. Fister was first among Diamond Jaxx pitchers in losses, games started, innings pitched (134 1/3), hits allowed (155), runs allowed (95), earned runs allowed (81), home runs allowed (12); and was second in wins, bases on balls (walks) allowed (45), and strikeouts. He was also first in the Southern League in runs allowed and was second in losses and earned runs allowed. After the regular season, Fister played in the Arizona Fall League (AFL) with the Peoria Javelinas. In the AFL, Fister was involved in no decisions with a 3.32 ERA, and 22 strikeouts in 11 games, all in relief.

==== 2009: MLB debut ====
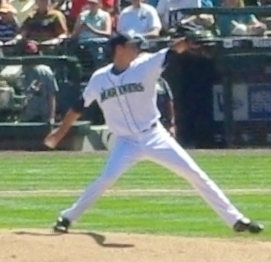
Fister pitching for the Seattle Mariners in 2009

In 2009, Fister began the season in Double-A for the third consecutive season. However, he was later promoted to the Triple-A Tacoma Rainiers, and eventually the Seattle Mariners.

In just two games with the Diamond Jaxx, Fister went 1–0 and gave-up no earned runs. With the Rainiers, Fister went 6–4 with a 3.81 ERA, and 79 strikeouts in 22 games, 17 starts.

On August 7, Fister was promoted to the majors. As a result, pitcher Jason Vargas was optioned to Triple-A Tacoma to make room for Fister on the Mariners' 25-man roster.

In his major league debut against the Tampa Bay Rays on August 8, Fister pitched one inning, struck out one, gave up one hit, and gave up one walk. He made his first start on August 11 against the Chicago White Sox and picked up the loss. Fister's first win came on August 16 against the New York Yankees. Fister finished the season with a major league record of 3–4 with a 4.13 ERA, and 36 strikeouts in 11 games, 10 of them starts.

==== 2010 season ====
In 2010, Fister started the first game for the Mariners in spring training. Going into the season, Fister, and fellow starting pitchers Garrett Olson, Luke French and Vargas competed for the Mariners' fifth spot in the starting rotation. Fister ended up getting a job in the rotation, as did Vargas. On April 19, Fister took a no-hitter into the seventh inning against the Baltimore Orioles until it was broken up by Nick Markakis' leadoff single. Although the Mariners suffered early season woes, Todd Dybas of the Seattle Post-Intelligencer praised Fister and fellow starter Vargas as reasons for why the Mariners were not doing worse, stating, "If Doug Fister and Jason Vargas hadn't been excellent at the back end of the rotation, God knows where this club would be."

==== 2011 season ====
In 2011, Fister was the Mariners' number three starter behind Félix Hernández and Vargas.

=== Detroit Tigers ===
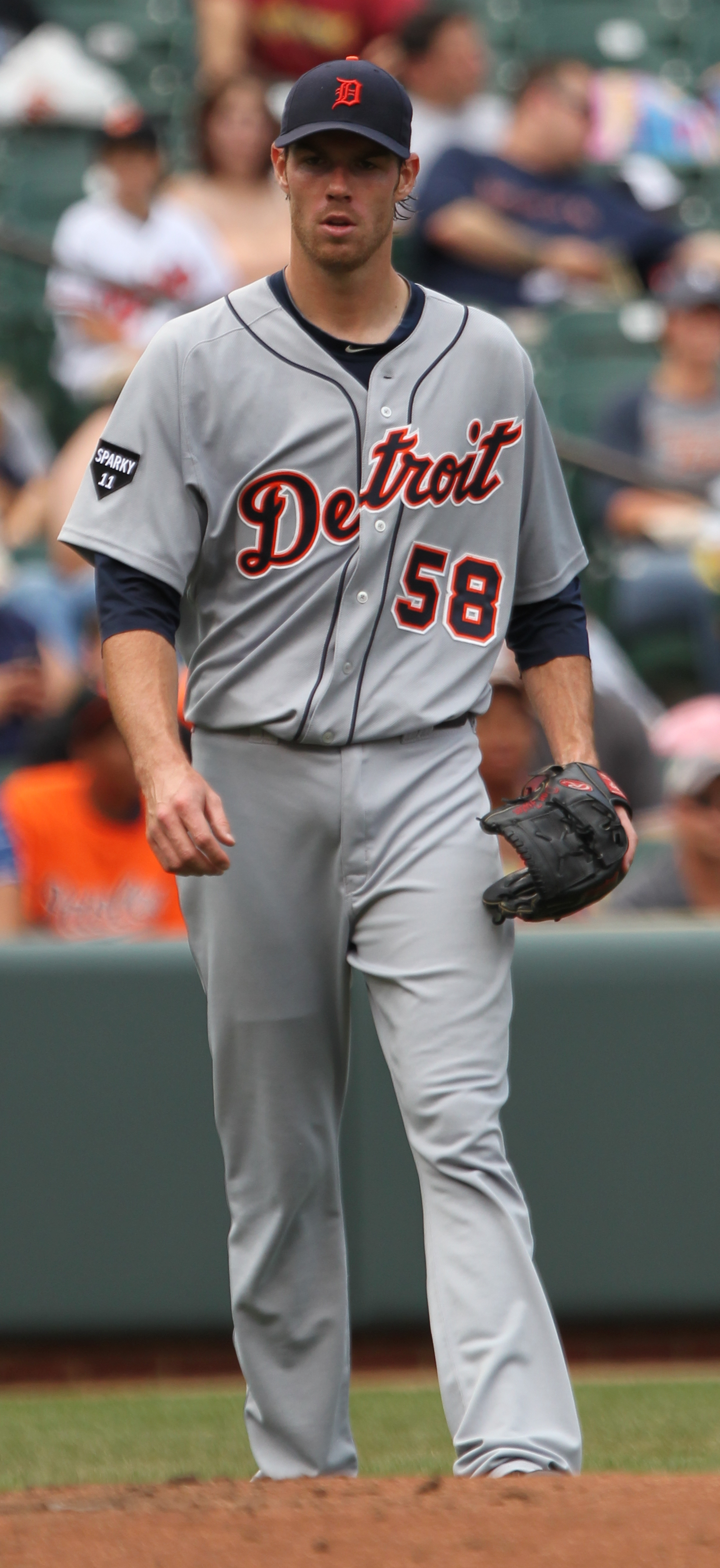
Fister with the Detroit Tigers in 2011

On July 30, 2011, Fister was traded to the Detroit Tigers along with relief pitcher David Pauley in exchange for Casper Wells, Charlie Furbush, Francisco Martinez, and a player to be named later. On August 17, the Tigers sent Chance Ruffin to the Mariners to complete the trade. Before being dealt to the Detroit Tigers, Fister had a 3–12 record with a 3.33 ERA in 21 starts.

After his trade to the Tigers, Fister went 8–1 with a 1.79 ERA in 10 starts. He finished the season 11–13, with an ERA of 2.83 that placed him fourth among American League (AL) pitchers.

Fister was named the AL Pitcher of the Month for September after going 5–0 with a 0.53 ERA in five starts.

Facing the New York Yankees in the AL Divisional Series (ALDS), Fister bounced back from a rough Game 1 outing to earn the win in the decisive Game 5. Fister limited the Yankees to one run on five hits and two walks over five innings in the Tigers 3–2 victory, which sent them to the AL Championship Series (ALCS).

In Game 3 of the ALCS, he held the Texas Rangers' offense to two runs in 7 1/3 innings to get the win in a 5–2 Tigers victory.

==== 2012 season ====
On April 7 while pitching against the Red Sox, Fister left the game due to an injury. The next day, Fister was placed on the 15-day disabled list with a strain of the costochondral muscle in his left side, an injury to the ribcage. Brayan Villarreal was recalled from Triple-A Toledo to take his place on the roster. On September 22, Fister threw his first career shutout, blanking the Minnesota Twins 8–0 on seven hits. In his next start on September 27, he set an American League record by striking out nine batters in a row against the Kansas City Royals. This was just one short of the major league record (10) set by Tom Seaver in 1970. He finished the 2012 regular season with a 10–10 record and a 3.45 ERA in 26 starts.

Fister pitched in the second game of the ALDS against the Oakland A's, picking up a no decision in a 5–4 victory while giving up two runs in seven innings. He also got a no-decision in Game 1 of the ALCS against the Yankees, despite surrendering no runs in 6 1/3 innings of work. Fister was struck in the head by a line drive off the bat of San Francisco Giants outfielder Gregor Blanco during the second inning of Game 2 of the World Series. Fister continued to pitch the game, holding the Giants to one run over six innings before turning it over to the bullpen.

==== 2013 season ====
Fister was injury-free in 2013, making 32 starts for the Tigers. He set career highs went 14–9 with a 3.67 ERA and 159 strikeouts.

Fister made a start in Game 4 of the ALDS against Oakland, with the Tigers facing elimination. He gave up three runs and seven hits in six innings of work. The Tigers won the game with a late rally, so Fister did not factor in the decision. In Game 4 of the ALCS against the Boston Red Sox, Fister gave up just one run on eight hits, striking out seven over six innings and earning the win in a 7–3 Tigers victory.

Following the 2013 season, Fister was named a finalist for the Gold Glove Award for the pitcher position alongside Mark Buehrle and R. A. Dickey. Fister finished the season with no errors for a perfect 1.000 fielding percentage. Additionally, he led all AL pitchers in putouts (23) and double plays started (5), and was seventh in assists (29).

=== Washington Nationals ===
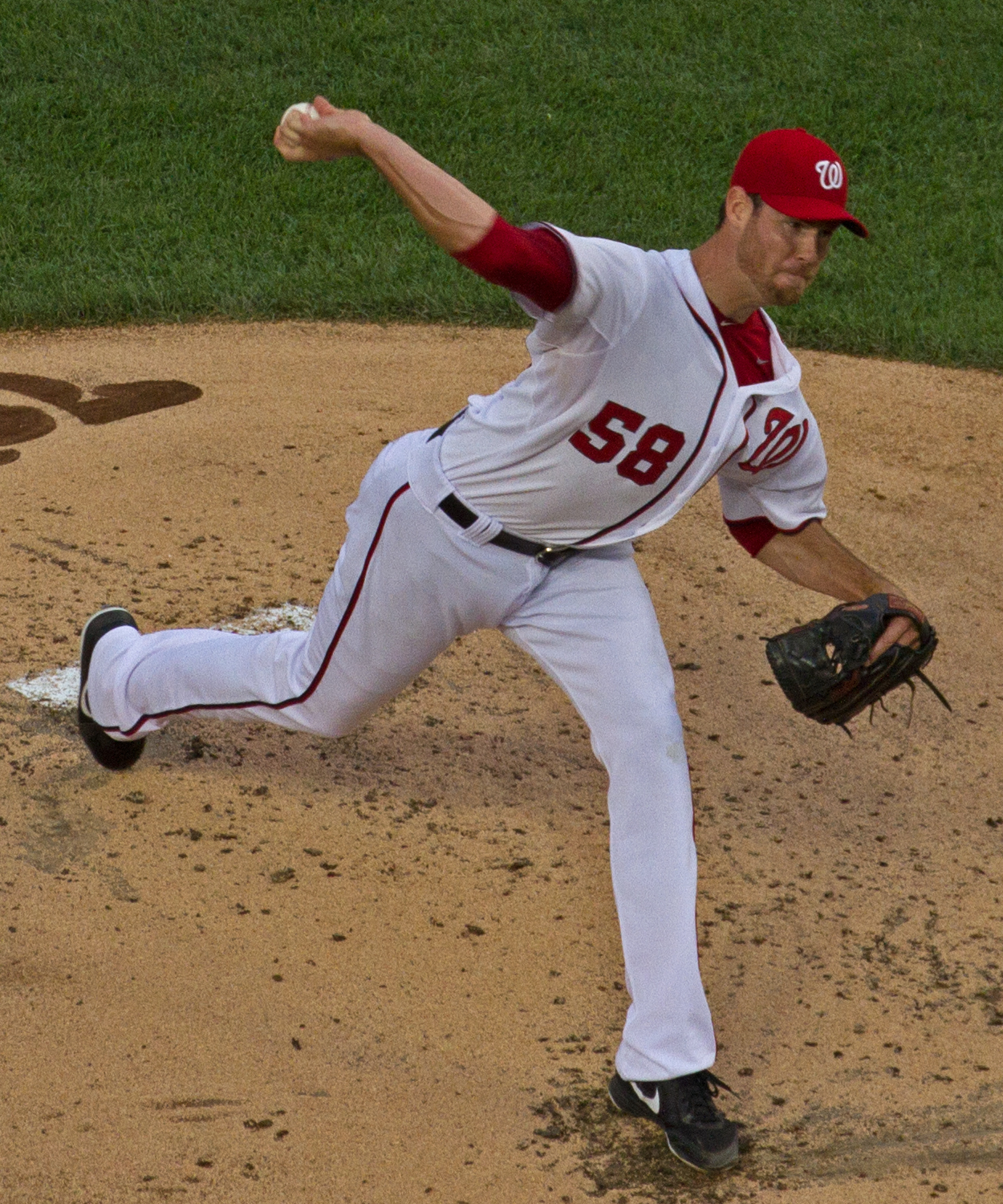
Fister with the Washington Nationals

On December 2, 2013, Fister was traded to the Washington Nationals for utility player Steve Lombardozzi Jr. and left-handed pitchers Ian Krol and Robbie Ray.

During spring training with the Nationals, Fister developed a strained lat muscle on his right side that put him on the disabled list to start the 2014 season. He returned on May 9 against the Athletics, where he gave up five earned runs on nine hits in 4 1/3 innings. He bounced back in his next start, against the Arizona Diamondbacks, Fister gave up one earned run on five hits in seven innings. Fister finished the season with a 16–6 record over 164 IP, tallying 98 strikeouts, a 1.08 WHIP (5th in the National League (NL) among qualified starters), and a 2.41 ERA (4th in the NL). Fister placed 8th in NL Cy Young Award voting with one fouth place vote and three fifth place votes for a total of five points.

Fister pitched in 25 games for the Nationals in 2015, 15 of which were starts. He posted a 5–7 record, 4.19 ERA, and 63 strikeouts in 103 innings pitched.

=== Houston Astros ===
On January 28, 2016, Fister signed a one-year, $7 million contract with the Houston Astros. He became a free agent at the end of the season.

=== Los Angeles Angels ===
On May 20, 2017, Fister signed a minor-league contract with the Los Angeles Angels. On June 21, he opted out of his Angels contract and was placed on waivers.

=== Boston Red Sox ===
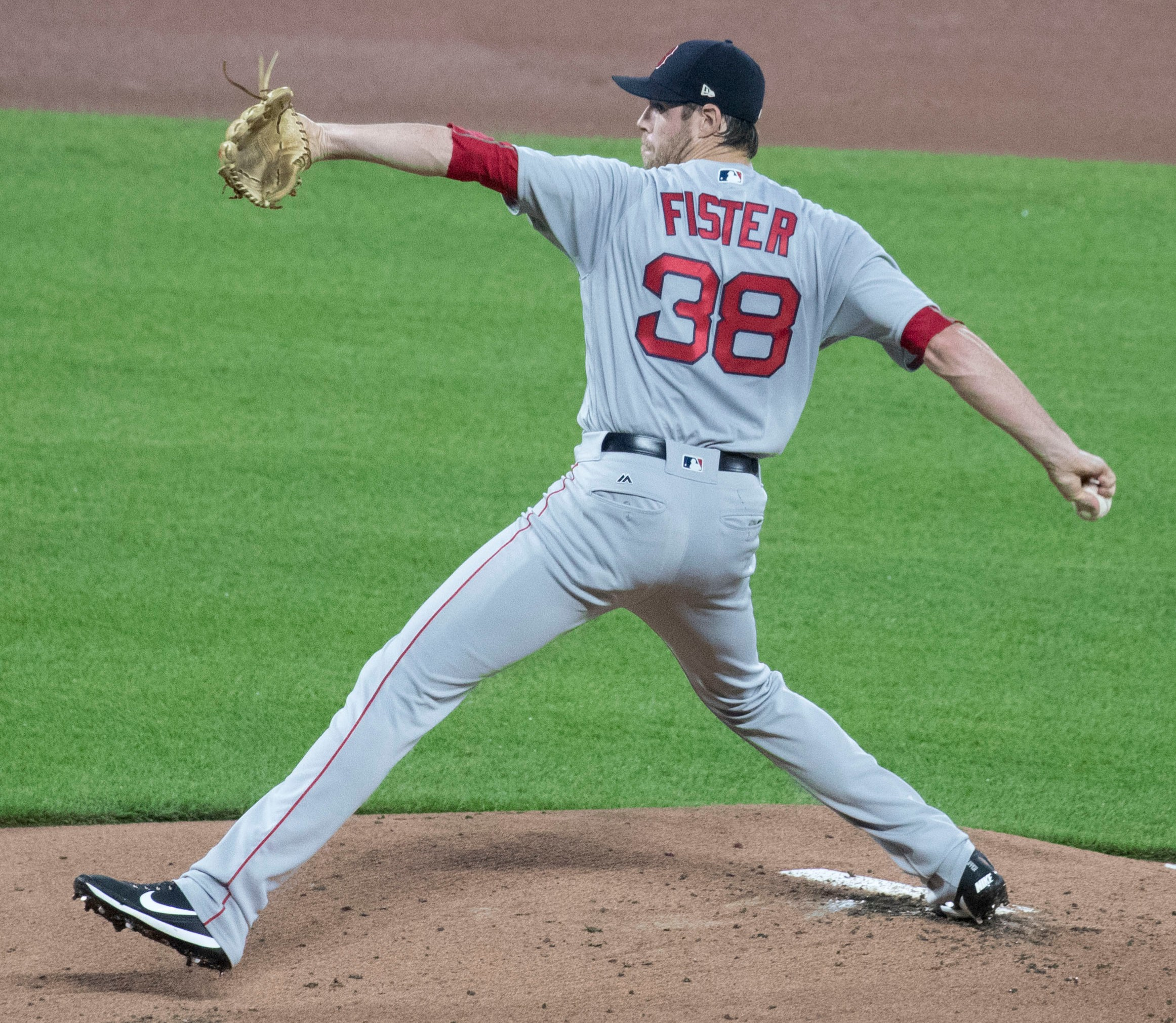
Fister with the Red Sox in 2017

On June 23, 2017, Fister was claimed off waivers by the Boston Red Sox. On June 25, Fister made his first start with the Red Sox, going 6 innings and striking out 6 batters, allowing 3 earned runs and in a 4–2 loss against the Los Angeles Angels. On August 22 in Cleveland, Fister allowed a lead-off home run to Francisco Lindor to briefly tie the score at 1–1, but this would turn out to be the only hit registered by the Indians as Fister would go on to pitch a complete-game 1-hitter and not allow a hit to the final 28 batters faced in the game in a 9–1 Red Sox win. He became a free agent following the season.

=== Texas Rangers ===
On November 28, 2017, Fister signed a one-year, $4 million, contract with the Texas Rangers that included a team option for 2019. He made 12 starts for the Rangers in 2018 before suffering a season-ending right knee strain on June 9. The Rangers declined his option after the season.

=== Retirement ===
On February 13, 2019, Fister announced his retirement from professional baseball.

== Pitching style ==
Fister threw four pitches and was mainly a groundball pitcher. His two seam fastball was thrown at 88–91 miles per hour (142–146 km/h). His other pitches were a cutter (85–87 miles per hour (137–140 km/h)), a curveball (73–79 miles per hour (117–127 km/h)), and a changeup (80–84 miles per hour (129–135 km/h)). The curveball was his best swing-and-miss pitch, with a career whiff rate of over 30%. Fister finished third and fourth in 2010 and 2011, respectively, in lowest walks per nine innings ratio.

Fister ran 10 miles (16 km) on days he did not pitch.

Fister stands 6 feet 8 inches (2.03 m) tall and was among the tallest players in the major leagues.

== Personal life ==
Fister and his wife have two daughters. Fister shares a middle name with his brother, father, and grandfather.
