= AESD =

AESD may refer to:

- Adelanto Elementary School District
- Association of Engineering and Shipbuilding Draughtsmen
- Atwater Elementary School District
