= Central California (disambiguation) =

Central California is the central portion of the U.S. state of California. Central California may also refer to:

- United States District Court for the Central District of California
- Willams, California, formerly Central, California
- Central California Conference, an athletic organization

== See also ==
- California (disambiguation)
