= Chuck Compton =

American football player (born 1965)

No. 41
- Position: Defensive back

Personal information
- Born: January 13, 1965 (age 61); Atwater, California, U.S.
- Listed height: 5 ft 10 in (1.78 m)
- Listed weight: 190 lb (86 kg)

Career information
- High school: Atwater
- College: Boise State
- NFL draft: 1987: undrafted

Career history
- Los Angeles Rams (1987)*; Green Bay Packers (1987)
- * Offseason or practice squad member only
- Stats at Pro Football Reference

Chuck Compton (born January 13, 1965) is an American former professional football player who was a defensive back for the Green Bay Packers in the National Football League (NFL). He played in two games with the Packers during the 1987 NFL season as a replacement player after the National Football League Players Association (NFLPA) went on strike for 24 days. Compton played college football for the Boise State Broncos before his professional career.

== Early life and college ==
Chuck Compton was born on January 13, 1965, in Atwater, California. He graduated from Atwater High School before attending Merced College. After being named first team All-Central Valley, All-California and to the junior college All-American team at Merced, Compton transferred to Boise State University, where he played defensive back for the Boise State Broncos football team. In 1984, Compton was named first-team All-Big Sky as a cornerback. This was the first year he had ever played the position, as previously in junior college he was a safety. During the 1985 season, Compton broke his ankle and was unable to play for the rest of the season. Compton again broke his ankle in the 1986 season during the first game of the year. He returned halfway through the season. After the end of the 1986 season, Boise State's assistant coach Herb Criner noted that Compton had impressed NFL scouts and that he was a "complete corner" and had "all the qualities you look for in a defensive back".

== Career ==
Compton went undrafted in the 1987 NFL draft. He had a tryout with the Los Angeles Rams and was offered a contract, however, he either failed his physical examination or was signed and then released due to an ankle injury. After the second week of the 1987 NFL season, the NFLPA went on strike. The third week of the season was canceled, however weeks 4, 5 and 6 were played with replacement players. Compton was then signed by the Green Bay Packers before a week 5 game against the Detroit Lions as a replacement player. He played two games for the Packers.
