= Adrian Trevino =

American football player (born 1998)

No. 12
- Position: Placekicker

Personal information
- Born: January 2, 1988 (age 38)
- Listed height: 5 ft 11 in (1.80 m)
- Listed weight: 195 lb (88 kg)

Career information
- High school: Golden Valley (Merced, California)
- College: Missouri Valley
- NFL draft: 2010: undrafted

Career history
- Mid-Missouri Outlaws (2010); Nebraska Danger (2011); Green Bay Blizzard (2012); Utah Blaze (2013); Green Bay Blizzard (2014); Cleveland Gladiators (2015–2016); Philadelphia Soul (2017–2018); Albany Empire (2019)

Awards and highlights
- 2× ArenaBowl champion (2017, 2019); 2× First-team All-Arena (2017, 2019); Second-team All-Arena (2018); 2× AFL Kicker of the Year (2017, 2019)
- Stats at ArenaFan.com

Adrian Trevino (born January 2, 1988) is an American former professional football placekicker who played six seasons in the Arena Football League (AFL) with the Utah Blaze, Cleveland Gladiators, Philadelphia Soul, and Albany Empire. He played college football at Merced College and Missouri Valley College.

== Early life ==
Adrian Trevino was born on January 2, 1988. He attended Golden Valley High School in Merced, California. He first played college football at Merced College before transferring to play at Missouri Valley College, with his final year being in 2009. He earned College Fanz Sports Network NAIA honorable mention All-American honors as a junior in 2008.

== Professional career ==
Trevino played for the Mid-Missouri Outlaws of the American Professional Football League (APFL), and was named the league's top kicker in 2010.

Trevino played for the Nebraska Danger of the Indoor Football League (IFL) in 2011. He played for the Green Bay Blizzard of the IFL in 2012.

Trevino was assigned to the Utah Blaze of the Arena Football League (AFL) on March 16, 2013. He made 25 of 28 extra points and recovered one fumble before being placed on injured reserve on May 6. He was placed on reassignment on May 31, 2013.

Trevino returned to the Blizzard in 2014, appearing in 12 games while making 12 of 32 field goals and scoring 56 extra points.

Trevino was assigned to the AFL's Cleveland Gladiators on April 1, 2015. He was placed on recallable reassignment on April 14, and activated from recallable reassignment on April 15, 2015. He converted seven of eight field goals and 104 of 117 extra points during the 2015 season while also posting two solo tackles and three assisted tackles. The next year, Trevino was placed on physically unable to perform on March 18, 2016, activated on March 25, placed on emergency hold on May 6, and activated from emergency hold on May 13, 2016. Overall in 2016, he recorded one of four field goals, 98 of 107 extra points, six solo tackles, and one assisted tackle.

Trevino joined the Philadelphia Soul of the AFL in 2017. He made one of four field goals and 104 of 114 extra points, earning first-team All-Arena and AFL Kicker of the Year honors. Trevino was the third Soul kicker in a row to win the AFL Kicker of the Year award: Tommy Frevert won in 2015 and 2016. On August 26, 2017, the Soul won ArenaBowl XXX against the Tampa Bay Storm by a score of 44–40. Trevino was assigned to the Soul again on March 22, 2018. He was placed on the refused to report list on March 28 and was later activated on April 11, 2018. During the 2018 season, he converted two of four field goals and 78 of 83 extra points, garnering second-team All-Arena recognition.

Trevino was assigned to the Albany Empire of the AFL on March 15, 2019. He was placed on refuse to report on April 1, activated on April 18, placed on recallable reassignment on May 8, and activated again on May 9, 2019. Trevino converted zero of two field goals and 80 of 83 extra points in 2019, garnering first-team All-Arena and AFL Kicker of the Year recognition for the second time in his career. On August 11, 2019, the Empire beat Trevino's former team, the Soul, in ArenaBowl XXXII by a margin of 45–27. The AFL folded after the 2019 season.
