= Ken Bungarda =

American football player (born 1957)

No. 72
- Position: Offensive tackle

Personal information
- Born: January 25, 1957 (age 69); Hartford, Connecticut, U.S.
- Listed height: 6 ft 6 in (1.98 m)
- Listed weight: 270 lb (122 kg)

Career information
- High school: Livingston (CA)
- College: Missouri
- NFL draft: 1979: 11th round, 278th overall pick

Career history
- Cincinnati Bengals (1979)*; Toronto Argonauts (1979); San Francisco 49ers (1980)
- * Offseason or practice squad member only

Awards and highlights
- Super Bowl champion (XVI)

Career NFL statistics
- Games played: 15
- Stats at Pro Football Reference

Kestutis John "Ken" Bungarda (born January 25, 1957) is an American former professional football player who was an offensive tackle in the Canadian Football League (CFL) and National Football League (NFL). He played college football for the Missouri Tigers (1975–1978) before playing in the CFL for the Toronto Argonauts (1979) and in the NFL for the San Francisco 49ers (1980).

== Early life ==
Bungarda was born in 1957 in Hartford, Connecticut, and attended Livingston High School in Berkeley Heights, New Jersey. He played college football for the Missouri Tigers from 1975 to 1978. He played at the defensive end position at Missouri and received the nickname "Tarzan".

== Professional football ==
He was selected by the Cincinnati Bengals in the 11th round (278th overall pick) of the 1979 NFL draft. He instead signed with the Toronto Argonauts of the CFL, appearing in four games during the 1979 season. In 1980, he signed with the San Francisco 49ers and appeared in 15 games. He suffered a knee injury early in the 1981 season and did not appear in any regular-season games in 1981.
