= Merced Union High School District =

School district in California

Address
- 3430 A Street Atwater, California, 95301; United States
- Coordinates: 37.367181°N 120.57023°W

District information
- Type: Public
- Grades: 9–12
- Superintendent: Alan Peterson
- Schools: 9
- Budget: $176,153,000
- NCES District ID: 0624660

Students and staff
- Students: 10,977 (2020–2021)
- Teachers: 521.36 (FTE)
- Staff: 560.48 (FTE)
- Student–teacher ratio: 21.05:1

Other information
- Website: www.muhsd.org

The Merced Union High School District (MUHSD) is a school district headquartered in the Castle Commerce Center on the grounds of the Castle Airport Aviation and Development Center in unincorporated Merced County, California, near Atwater. The union high school district serves Atwater, Livingston, Merced, and the surrounding area.

== Demographics ==
In November 1990 the district had 1,057 students of Southeast Asian origin, including 597 boys and 460 girls. At the time the high school enrollment among Hmong had a large gender imbalance because Hmong girls were pressured to marry relatively early in their lives.

== Schools ==
=== Adult schools ===
- Merced Adult School (Merced)

=== High schools ===
- Atwater High School (Atwater)
- Buhach Colony High School (Atwater)
- El Capitan High School (Merced) -
- Golden Valley High School (Merced)
- Independence High School (Merced)
- Livingston High School (Livingston)
- Merced High School (Merced)
- Sequoia High School (Merced)
- Yosemite High School (Merced)

== Headquarters ==
The district has its headquarters within the Castle Commerce Center in unincorporated Merced County, California, near Atwater. The Castle Commerce Center is a 552-acre (223 ha) business park located on the grounds of the Castle Airport Aviation and Development Center (the former Castle Air Force Base). The development houses commercial and industrial development.
