= Bernard Berrian =

American football player (born 1980)

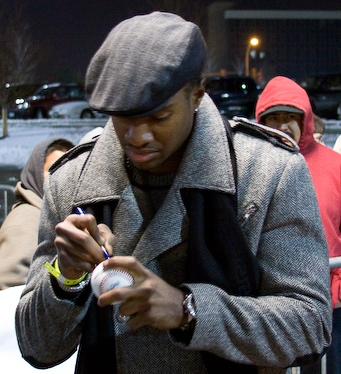
- Berrian in 2008

No. 80, 87
- Position: Wide receiver

Personal information
- Born: December 27, 1980 (age 45); Barcelona, Spain
- Listed height: 6 ft 1 in (1.85 m)
- Listed weight: 185 lb (84 kg)

Career information
- High school: Atwater (Atwater, California, U.S.)
- College: Fresno State (1999–2003)
- NFL draft: 2004: 3rd round, 78th overall pick

Career history
- Chicago Bears (2004–2007); Minnesota Vikings (2008–2011)

Awards and highlights
- First-team All-American (2001); NFL record: Longest receiving touchdown: 99 yards (tied)

Career NFL statistics
- Receptions: 288
- Receiving yards: 4,122
- Receiving touchdowns: 24
- Stats at Pro Football Reference

Bernard Berrian (born December 27, 1980) is an American former professional football player who was a wide receiver in the National Football League (NFL). He played college football for the Fresno State Bulldogs, earning first-team All-American honors in 2001. Berrian was selected by the Chicago Bears in the third round of the 2004 NFL draft. He also played in the NFL for the Minnesota Vikings.

== Early life ==
Berrian was born in Spain, and grew up in Winton, California, while both of his parents served at Castle Air Force Base. Berrian attended Atwater High School in Atwater, California, where he played football and basketball and ran track. He was named Modesto Bee player of the year in 1998. Cal High All-Northern California team member. He was known as an explosive two-way starter for Atwater High School, which went 13–1 his senior year, after he caught 53 passes for 1,276 yards and 16 touchdowns. In track & field, he competed in the 200- and 400-meter dashes, recording times of 22.6 in the 200m and 50.6 in the 400m.

== Professional career ==
Pre-draft measurables
Height	Weight	Arm length	Hand span	40-yard dash	10-yard split	20-yard split	20-yard shuttle	Three-cone drill	Vertical jump	Broad jump
6 ft 1 in (1.85 m)	183 lb (83 kg)	30 1/2 in (0.77 m)	9 1/2 in (0.24 m)	4.61 s	1.63 s	2.72 s	4.18 s	7.34 s	38.0 in (0.97 m)	10 ft 8 in (3.25 m)
All values from NFL Combine

=== Chicago Bears ===
The Chicago Bears selected Berrian with the 78th pick in the third round of the 2004 NFL draft.

Berrian spent a majority of his early years with the Bears as a back-up wide receiver and return specialist. His playtime increased during the 2005 Chicago Bears season, but an injury kept him sidelined for a portion of the season. Berrian returned to play during the Bears' NFC Divisional game against the Carolina Panthers, but eventually he was forced to leave after sustaining an injury.

During the early half of the 2006 Chicago Bears season, Berrian emerged as one of the Bears's most productive receivers and sharpest deep-threat weapons. On November 5, 2006, Berrian suffered an injury to his ribs during a game against the Miami Dolphins. According to Berrian, he sustained the injury after hitting the ground during the very first play of the game. Berrian returned from the injury after missing only one game, but struggled at times. His surrogate, Mark Bradley, momentarily became the Bears' deep threat. Berrian finished the regular season as the Bears' second leading wide receiver, only a few catches behind team leader Muhsin Muhammad.

During the 2006 playoffs, in the divisional round game against the Seattle Seahawks, Berrian caught five passes for 105 yards, including a 68-yard touchdown pass. The Chicago Bears went on to win 27–24 in overtime. In the NFC championship game against the New Orleans Saints, Berrian led the Bears with five receptions for 85 yards. He also made a clutch, 33-yard diving touchdown reception behind a jumping Fred Thomas, giving the Bears an eleven-point lead, which contributed to their 39–14 victory. Well after the season's conclusion, the catch was named one of the Bears' top ten plays in 2006. Berrian played in Super Bowl XLI against the Indianapolis Colts, where he caught four passes for 38 yards. Berrian was in the last year of his contract and the Bears chose not to put a franchise tag on him. The Bears had to wait until the Free Agency period on February 29, 2008, for Berrian to become an unrestricted free agent and negotiate a new contract.

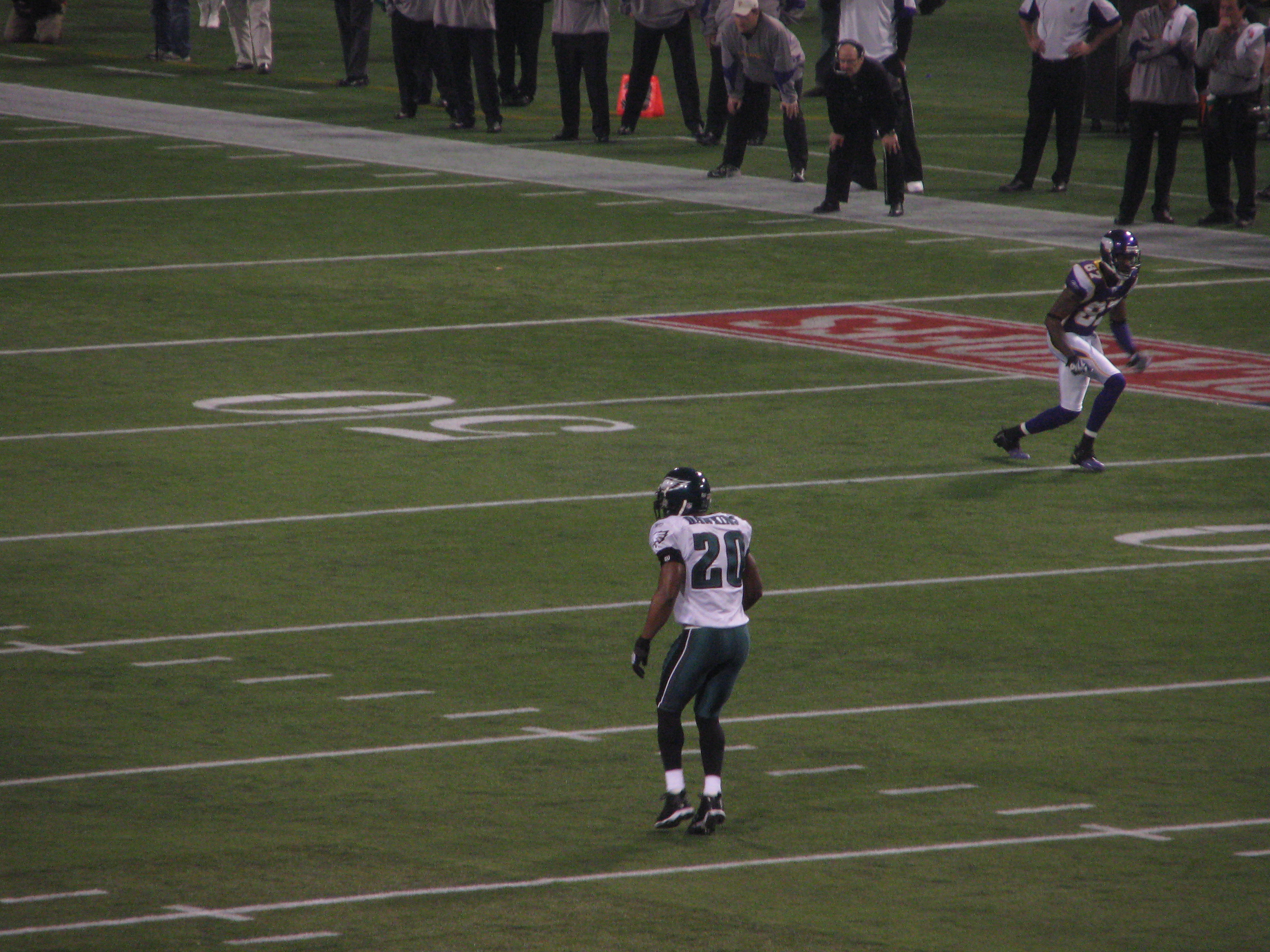
Berrian (top right, 87) and Brian Dawkins in January 2009.

=== Minnesota Vikings ===
On March 1, 2008, Berrian signed a six-year, $42 million contract with the Minnesota Vikings that included $16 million in guaranteed money.

His first touchdown as a Viking was against the New Orleans Saints which tied up the game 27–27 they would later win that game 30–27. He led all wideouts with 102 yards off a career playoff-high nine catches. He also caught an 86-yard catch and run against the Lions. On November 30, 2008, in a game against the Chicago Bears, Berrian caught a 99-yard touchdown pass from Gus Frerotte, tying an NFL record for the longest pass from scrimmage. On December 14, 2008, he returned an 82-yard punt against the Arizona Cardinals after a quick three and out on their opening drive. He also caught a 49-yard touchdown pass in a 28–21 victory over the Houston Texans. Berrian had the highest average per. catch that NFL season with 20.1 yards per catch. Berrian finished the season with 48 catches, 964 yards and 7 touchdowns. (50 catches for exactly 1,000 yards and 7 touchdowns including the playoffs.) In 2009, with the acquisition of 20-year veteran quarterback Brett Favre, Berrian became one of the deep threats of the wide receiver core along with Sidney Rice, Percy Harvin, and Visanthe Shiancoe. He struggled with a hamstring injury that bothered him all season long. He ended the season with 55 catches for 618 yards and 4 touchdowns, 2 touchdowns in the series with the Green Bay Packers, and 2 in the games with the Seattle Seahawks and Baltimore Ravens. In the NFC Championship, Berrian recorded 9 receptions for 102 yards.

In 2010, the 7-year veteran finished with 28 receptions, for 252 yards, and no touchdowns. It was his lowest season in his entire career. His best performance of the season came against the Arizona Cardinals where he caught 9 passes for 91 yards.

On October 24, 2011, Berrian was released by the Vikings.

== Charity work ==
In November 2008, Bernard pledged to donate up to $10,000 to Second Harvest Heartland, Minnesota's largest hunger-relief organization, to provide turkeys to hungry inner-city families for the holiday season. He donated $5,000 to Second Harvest Heartland to provide turkeys to local inner-city families for Thanksgiving. Berrian has expressed interest in participating in additional community outreach programs.

Berrian was a contestant on NBC's Minute to Win It on September 7, 2010, where he was playing to win money for the Second Harvest Heartland.

== Personal life ==
During a Monday Night Football appearance, Muhsin Muhammad revealed that Berrian's nickname is "B-twice". However, in a later interview with Fox News Chicago, Berrian stated his teammates also call him, "California Cool". ChicagoBears.com's columnists and announcers also refer to Berrian as the "Silent Assassin". He is friends with Chad Johnson and appeared occasionally on his dating show Ochocinco: The Ultimate Catch.

In 2015, Berrian was inducted into the Fresno County Athletic Hall of Fame.

== NFL career statistics ==
Legend
**Bold**	Career high

Year	Team	Games		Receiving					Rushing					Fumbles	
Year	Team	GP	GS	Rec	Yds	Avg	Lng	TD	Att	Yds	Avg	Lng	TD	Fum	Lost
2004	CHI	16	1	15	225	15.0	49T	2	**8**	28	3.5	25	0	0	0
2005	CHI	11	2	13	246	18.9	54	0	2	**31**	**15.5**	**37**	0	1	0
2006	CHI	15	14	51	775	15.2	62	6	2	5	2.5	5	0	**2**	**1**
2007	CHI	16	15	**71**	951	13.4	59T	5	—	—	—	—	—	1	**1**
2008	MIN	16	13	48	**964**	**20.1**	**99T**	**7**	4	26	6.5	14	0	1	**1**
2009	MIN	16	15	55	618	11.6	40	4	—	—	—	—	—	0	0
2010	MIN	14	12	28	252	9.0	30	0	1	−8	−8.0	−8	0	0	0
Career		104	72	281	4,031	14.3	99T	24	17	82	4.8	37	0	5	3
