= Buhach Colony High School =

Coordinates: 37°20′54.38″N 120°34′30.97″W

- 1800 Buhach Rd. Atwater, California, 95301; United States

Information
- Type: Public
- Motto: Teaching and Reaching All Students
- Established: 2001
- School district: Merced Union High School District
- Principal: N/A
- Grades: 9 to 12
- Enrollment: 1,658 (2023-2024)
- Color
- Athletics conference: Central California Conference
- Mascot: Thor, God of Thunder
- Team name: Buhach Colony Thunder
- Website: BCHS homepage

Buhach Colony High School is a public high school in Atwater, California, United States. Opened in 2001, the school is part of the Merced Union High School District. The school colors are black and gold, and the mascot is Thor. The name refers to the unincorporated community of Buhach, where in the 1890's Portuguese immigrant farmers who owned their land were known as the Buhach Colony.

== Curriculum ==
Buhach Colony High School has changed its period schedule as of this year. It now runs a 7 period schedule. Classes begin at 8:30 AM and conclude at 3:15 PM. The school offers a variety of courses: English, mathmatics, band, science, and history. Other classes include Spanish, Engineering, Business and Programming, and Art and Computer Graphics. Many Pre-AP and Advanced Placement courses are offered at Buhach Colony. Regional Occupation Program (ROP) classes are also offered at Buhach. Buhach switched from a block schedule to a traditional schedule in the 2011-2012 school year.

== Extracurricular activities ==
=== Music ===
Buhach Colony hosts a music program currently directed by Chad J. Humpal, who received his Bachelors's and Master's degree in Music from the University of Southern California. In the fall the music program participates in the NCBA(Northern California Band Association) marching competitions across the state with its Marching Band, Fall Drumline, and Color Guard. In the Winter and Spring, they change into a concert band who competes in the Bay Section CMEA(California Music Educator Association). The color guard and drumline also compete in the NCBA winter competitions. The school also hosts a choir who performs in CMEA competition as well. The Buhach Colony Music Program also hosts the Merced Union High School District Orchestra after school.

=== Academic Decathlon ===
The BCHS Academic Decathlon team is currently being coached by Joshua Newton (also teaches AP US History and AP European History). As a program they have been successful, having won both, the 2021 and 2023 Regional Competitions (local to Merced County) and placing third in the 2021 State Competition, which stands as the first time any high school in Merced County has medaled at state competition.

=== Speech and Debate ===
The Buhach Colony Speech and Debate team is under the current coach Christopher Ingle as of 2024. After being established in 2015 with the help of former assistant coach Alyssa Conroy, it was run for 8 years by Coach Kristopher Freitas. The Speech and Debate team has qualified for State Championships 9 times and the National Championships 8 times. During the National Championship in Phoenix, Arizona in 2023, The BCHS Debate team made school history by contributing to the Central Valley advancing in a main event.

=== Theater Arts ===
Theater classes are instructed by C. Alan Bettis. Crystal Langley is the Buhach Colony and Golden Valley High School's theater manager. Buhach has one of the newest and largest theaters in Merced County. The Buhach theater arts department invites the community to view its performances throughout the year. Atwater High School's theater arts teacher, Mrs. Agular, teams up with Buhach Colony High School's theater arts instructor, C. Alan Bettis, every year for a large production (known as ABC productions).

=== Athletics ===
Buhach Colony participates in the competitive Central California Conference. Sports include football, volleyball, cross country, water polo, swimming, soccer, basketball, wrestling, track and field, baseball, softball, golf and tennis. In late 2009, the school began construction of a pool, to be used for its home water polo matches. Construction was completed in 2010 before the 2010-2011 academic year. Its cross-town rivalry against Atwater High School's Falcons has existed since Buhach Colony's opening in 2001.

=== FFA ===
In 2006, five Buhach Colony High School students participated in the 80th National FFA Convention in Indianapolis, after winning state in creed reading and dairy judging competitions. The school placed eighth overall and one of its students, Alison King, placed first in creed reading.

== Notable alumni ==
- Dylan Floro - MLB player for the Los Angeles Dodgers
- Daulton Jefferies - MLB player for the Oakland Athletics
- Aziz Shittu - Defensive tackle for the Philadelphia Eagles
