= Eric A. McAfee =

- Born: September 24, 1962 (age 64); Santa Monica, California, U.S.
- Occupations: entrepreneur venture capitalist philanthropist
- Website: http://www.ericmcafee.com/

Eric Armstrong McAfee (born September 24, 1962) is an entrepreneur, venture capitalist, and philanthropist, founding and funding companies in renewable energy, oil and gas, agriculture, networking devices and enterprise software. Based in the Silicon Valley, McAfee is Chairman of McAfee Capital, a growth equity investment fund; is a principal at merchant bank, Cagan McAfee Capital Partners; and co-founded Berg McAfee Companies, a holding company.

Since 1993, McAfee has served as a member of the Board of Directors of the California Manufacturers and Technology Association (CMTA). The CMTA “represents businesses from the entire manufacturing community—an economic sector that generates more than $250 billion every year and employs more than 1.5 million Californians.”

== Early life and education ==
McAfee was born in Santa Monica, California, and grew up on a farm west of Fresno. McAfee graduated from Merced High School in 1980. Upon his graduation from high school, McAfee traveled for one year as a performer and lead trumpet player with Up With People. While on tour with Up With People, McAfee visited 105 cities in Mexico and the United States, performed for the President of Mexico, and performed at the Indianapolis 500 and the World Figure Skating Championships.

In 1986, McAfee earned a B.S. in Management, with an emphasis in Statistics, from the Craig School of Business at California State University, Fresno. McAfee is also a 1993 graduate of the Stanford Graduate School of Business Executive Program and a 2004 graduate of the Harvard Business School Private Equity and Venture Capital Program. He is currently a resident of Loomis, California.

== Business career ==
Today, McAfee is a Silicon Valley entrepreneur and venture capitalist with lifelong commitment to agriculture and renewable energy. He is a founding shareholder of Pacific Ethanol ($800 million revenues, $85 million from Bill Gates equity). He is a founding shareholder of several publicly held energy companies, including Evolution Petroleum, Pacific Asia Petroleum, Particle Drilling Technologies, World Waste Technologies, and Solargen Energy. He has funded more than twenty-five companies as principal investor, and has founded seven public companies with a combined high market value of $4 billion.

His current project is Aemetis, Inc.. Aemetis has a mission to transform renewable energy into below zero carbon transportation fuels with its Carbon Zero production process to decarbonize the transportation sector using existing fuel delivery infrastructure through its Carbon Zero 1 plant in Riverbank, California to convert renewable electricity from solar and hydroelectric sources along with renewable hydrogen from waste orchard wood into renewable jet fuel, renewable diesel, renewable hydrogen and cellulosic ethanol, its biogas digester network and pipeline system to convert dairy waste gas from network of dairy digesters into Renewable Natural Gas (RNG), its ethanol production facility in California’s Central Valley near Modesto that supplies about 80 dairies with animal feed, its production facility on the East Coast of India producing high quality distilled biodiesel and refined glycerin for customers in India and Europe and its portfolio of patents and related technology licenses for the production of renewable fuels and biochemicals.

== Accolades ==
- 2007 Wharton School MBA Program Entrepreneur in Residence
- 2007 Opportunity International Al Whittaker Founder’s Award
- 2002 Craig School of Business Outstanding Alumnus Award
- 2001 Lyles Center Entrepreneur in Residence

== Career ==
=== Since 2000 ===
- In 2006, McAfee founded Solargen Energy, a vertically integrated solar farm company using thin-film photovoltaics.
- In 2006, McAfee co-founded Pacific Asia Petroleum, now Camac Energy, an energy company engaged in the exploration, development, production, and distribution of oil and gas.
- In 2005, McAfee founded AE Biofuels, an advanced energy cellulosic ethanol and biodiesel company.
- In 2004, McAfee took public World Waste Technologies, a converter of municipal solid waste to cellulose for applications including cardboard and ethanol production.
- In 2003, McAfee co-founded, with the former Secretary of State of California, Bill Jones, Pacific Ethanol, a marketer and producer of low-carbon renewable fuels.
- In 2003, McAfee co-founded Evolution Petroleum, an acquirer and developer of natural gas fields.
- In 2002, McAfee acquired Procera Networks, now an Evolved DPI solutions company.

=== 1990–2000 ===
- In 2000, McAfee co-founded and became the chairman of CI Systems, a broadband wireless software and services company that provided satellite-based two-way Internet and telecom services.
- In 2000, Berg McAfee Companies acquired majority control of Blast Energy Services, a proprietary milling and lateral drilling services company to the oil and gas industry.
- In 2000, McAfee co-founded Cagan McAfee Capital Partners, a Silicon Valley–based merchant bank that specializes in Slow Launch Public Offerings.
- In 1999, McAfee co-founded and joined the board of MindArrow Systems, an e-marketing software and services company.
- In 1999, McAfee Farms launched Organic Pastures Dairy Company, the largest organic pasture-based mobile dairy operation in the United States.
- In 1998, McAfee funded and joined the board of All Star Telecom, the leading fiber optics networking engineering and construction company in the Western United States.
- In 1998, McAfee co-founded Berg McAfee Companies, a Silicon Valley venture capital firm that has invested in more than twenty companies.
- In 1998, McAfee co-founded and joined the board of NetStream, one of the first Internet Protocol–based local telephone companies using digital soft-switch technology rather than analog switches.
- In 1996, McAfee founded McAfee Capital, to fund early-stage venture opportunities.
- In 1996, McAfee co-founded Global Digital Technologies, whose enterprise software technology was middleware between newspaper’s legacy systems and websites.
- In 1992, McAfee co-founded PC-card manufacturer New Media Corporation, whose customers included AT&T Wireless, Toshiba and AST Research.
- From 1988 to 1992, McAfee served in various management roles while with McAfee Partners, an advisory firm that provided services to private and publicly held turnaround and fast-growth companies.

=== 1975–1990 ===
- From 1986 to 1988, McAfee was an associate of John Dean and Barry Goldwater, Jr. at Western Mercantile, a Los Angeles leveraged buyout firm.
- While in high school, McAfee co-founded, with his brothers, McAfee Farms, now an organic almond producer, alfalfa grower, and dairy farm.

== Philanthropy ==
- McAfee has served as a member of Opportunity International’s Board of Governors. Opportunity International is one of the largest microfinance institutions in the world, serving the poorest of the poor, with more than 1 million loan clients per year in more than 35 countries and annual loans in excess of $370 million.
- In 2005, McAfee and his wife donated $1 million to Saratoga High School for the construction of the Performing Arts and Lecture Center. The McAfee Performing Arts and Lecture Center is a community performing arts center with 560 seats, serving the schools and community groups in Saratoga and nearby Silicon Valley cities.
- In 2005, McAfee and longtime friend, Bob Comes, used their plane to transport firefighters from Saratoga and San Jose along with officials from CityTeam Ministries, a San Jose–based nonprofit Christian ministry that helps the poor, to areas affected by Hurricane Katrina.
- In 2004, McAfee and his wife helped fund the construction of the 25,656 sq ft (2,383.5 m^{2}) Dr. Lapsley McAfee Fieldhouse and meadow at Mount Hermon. Mount Hermon is a 100-year-old, 400-acre (1.6 km^{2}) Christian conference center located in the Santa Cruz Mountains of Northern California that has more than 60,000 visitors per year. Completed in January 2006, the McAfee Fieldhouse, located on 5 acres (20,000 m^{2}), seats up to 750 people and contains a full basketball court (convertible into two volleyball courts), weight room, game room, rock climbing wall, and two meeting rooms.
