= Golden Valley High School (Merced, California) =

Location
- 2121 E. Childs Ave; Merced, California 95341; 37°17′18.8″N 120°27′2.2″W

Information
- School type: Public
- Established: 1994
- School district: Merced Union High School District
- Principal: Tiffany Gossman
- Grades: 9-12
- Enrollment: 1,955 (2023-2024)
- Campus size: 48 acres (190,000 m^{2})
- Colour: Cardinal Gold
- Athletics conference: Central California Conference
- Mascot: Cougar
- Rival: Merced High School
- Newspaper: Cougar Tracks
- Website: gvhs.muhsd.org

Golden Valley High School is a high school located within the Merced Union High School District in the community of Merced, California, United States. The school first opened in August 1994, with its first class of seniors graduating on June 5, 1996. The current enrollment is over 1,700 students in grades 9 through 12.

== Academics ==
=== Enrollment ===
According to the United States Department of Education's National Center for Education Statistics, enrollment characteristics for the 2014-2015 school year were as follows:

Enrollment by grade
	9	10	11	12
Students	454	441	431	459

Enrollment by gender
	Male	Female
Students	886	899

Enrollment by race/ethnicity
	American Indian/Alaskan	Asian/Pacific Islander	Black	Hispanic	White	Two or more races
Students	5	264	63	1,084	296	73

=== Rankings ===
Golden Valley's Advanced Placement program has earned the praise of Newsweek magazine, which named it a "Top 1300" school in the United States, three years running. Golden Valley has also garnered a Silver Award from U.S. News & World Report, which named it one of the top 1,800 schools in the United States.

== See also ==
- Buhach Colony High School
- Livingston High School
- Los Banos High School
- Merced High School
- Central California Conference
