= Lloyd Winston =

American football player (born 1939)

Profile
- Position: Fullback

Personal information
- Born: September 22, 1939 (age 87); United States
- Listed height: 6 ft 1 in (1.85 m)
- Listed weight: 215 lb (98 kg)

Career information
- High school: Merced (Merced, California)
- College: Santa Monica CC; USC

Career history
- San Francisco 49ers (1962–1963)
- Stats at Pro Football Reference

Lloyd Leonard Winston (born September 22, 1939) is an American former professional football player who was a fullback for the San Francisco 49ers of the National Football League (NFL) during the 1962 and 1963 seasons. He played college football for the USC Trojans.

== Early life ==
Winston attended Merced High School in Merced, California. As a running back at Merced, he was known as "hell on wheels" and a back who "defenders just bounced off."

He played college football at Santa Monica City College and the University of Southern California. In 1958, he rushed for 126 yards on 20 carries in a 30–12 upset victory over Oklahoma A&M, breaking the latter program's 19-game win streak. His college career was cut short by a severe knee injury sustained during his junior year at USC.

== Professional football ==
He later played professional football for the San Francisco 49ers during the 1962 and 1963 seasons. He appeared in a total of six NFL games, four of them as a starter, and totaled 112 rushing yards and one touchdown. He was released by the 49ers in October 1963.

He signed with the San Diego Chargers in May 1964, and then signed with the Oakland Raiders in July 1964.

== Later life ==
After his football career ended, Winston served with the San Francisco Police Department from 1966 to 1998.
