= Atwater, California =

City in California, United States

- City
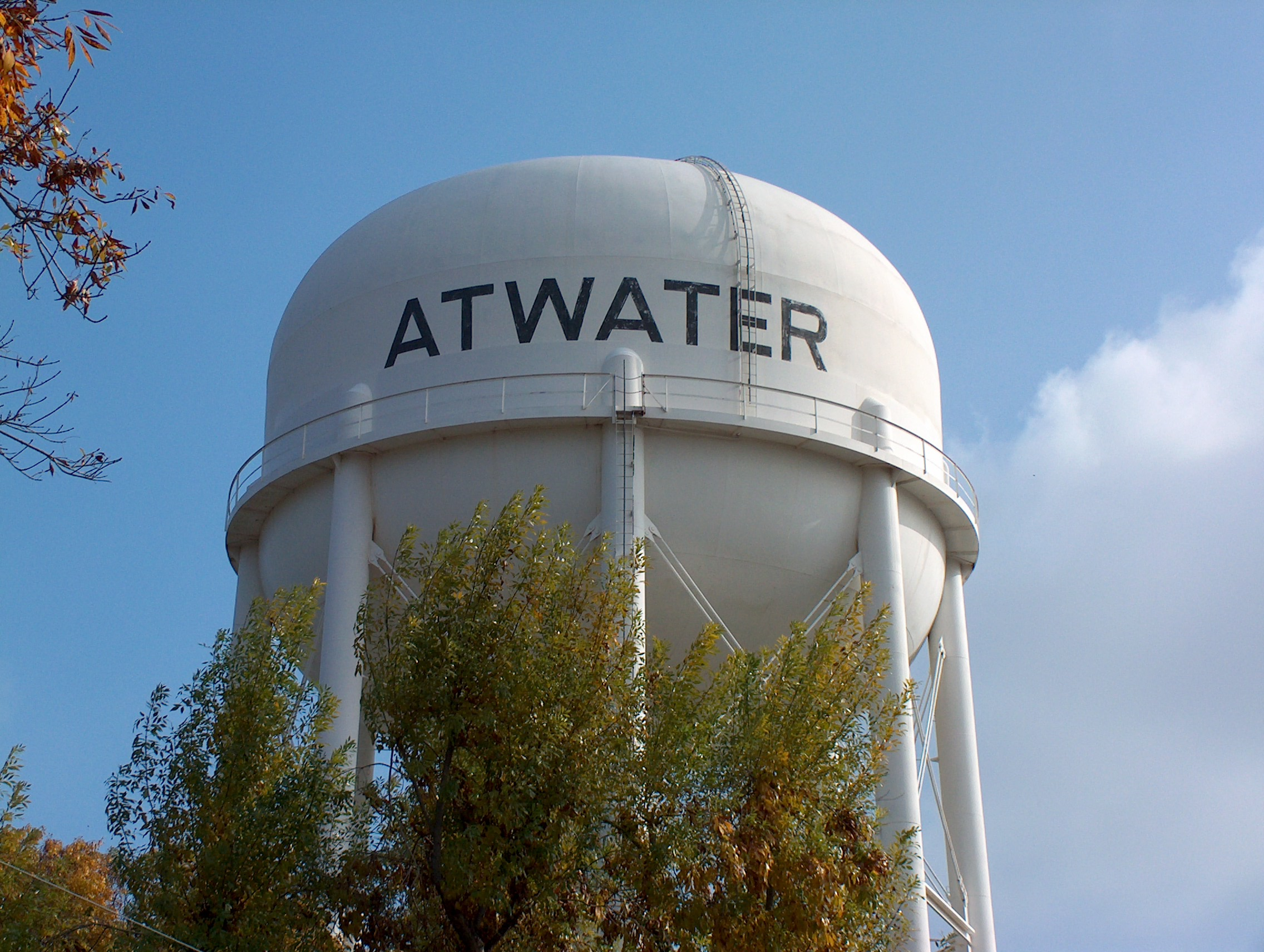
- Water tower in the city

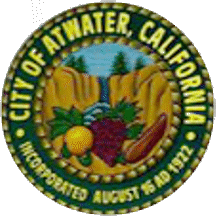
- Seal
- Motto: Community Pride, City Wide
- Interactive map of Atwater, California
- Location within California Location within the United States
- Coordinates: 37°20′52″N 120°36′33″W
- Country: United States
- State: California
- County: Merced
- Incorporated: August 16, 1922

Government
  - Mayor: Mike Nelson
  - State senator: Anna Caballero (D)
  - Assemblymember: Esmeralda Soria (D)
  - U. S. Rep.: Adam Gray (D)

Area
  - Total: 6.57 sq mi (17.0 km^{2})
  - Land: 6.57 sq mi (17.0 km^{2})
  - Water: 0.01 sq mi (0.026 km^{2}) 0.08%
- Elevation: 151 ft (46 m)

Population (2020)
  - Total: 31,970
  - Density: 4,868.28/sq mi (1,879.65/km^{2})
- Time zone: UTC-8 (Pacific)
  - Summer (DST): UTC-7 (Pacific)
- ZIP codes: 95301, 95342
- Area code: 209
- FIPS code: 06-03162
- GNIS feature ID: 277600
- Website: www.atwater.org

Atwater, officially the City of Atwater, is a city on State Route 99 in Merced County, California, United States. Atwater is 8 miles (13 km) west-northwest of Merced, at an elevation of 151 feet (46 m). The population as of the 2020 census was 31,970, up from 28,168 in 2010.

== Geography ==
Atwater is in northern Merced County, between Merced, the county seat, to the southeast and Livingston to the northwest. According to the United States Census Bureau, the city has a total area of 6.6 square miles (17 km^{2}), of which 99.92% is land and 0.08% is water.

The city includes Castle Air Museum, but does not include the former Castle Air Force Base proper, now repurposed as Castle Airport.

== History ==
The railroad reached Atwater in the 1870s, and a town grew around it. The first post office opened in 1880. Atwater incorporated in 1922. The name honors Marshall D. Atwater, a wheat farmer whose land was used by the railroad for its station.

North of the town is the site of Castle Air Force Base, the former World War II Merced Army Airfield. Castle was selected for closure under the 1991 Base Realignment and Closure Commission and the base closed September 30, 1995. The site is now a public airport.

On May 15, 2020, Atwater declared itself a business "sanctuary city" during the coronavirus pandemic.

== Demographics ==
Historical population
Census	Pop.	Note	%±
1930	917		—
1940	1,235		34.7%
1950	2,856		131.3%
1960	7,318		156.2%
1970	11,640		59.1%
1980	17,530		50.6%
1990	22,282		27.1%
2000	23,113		3.7%
2010	28,168		21.9%
2020	31,970		13.5%
U.S. Decennial Census

=== 2020 census ===
As of the 2020 census, Atwater had a population of 31,970 and a population density of 4,868.3 inhabitants per square mile (1,879.7/km^{2}). The census reported that 99.5% of residents lived in households, 0.2% lived in non-institutionalized group quarters, and 0.3% were institutionalized.

The median age was 33.2 years; 29.4% of residents were under the age of 18 and 12.8% were 65 years of age or older. For every 100 females there were 95.9 males, and for every 100 females age 18 and over there were 90.5 males.

There were 9,970 households in Atwater, of which 44.8% had children under the age of 18 living in them. Of all households, 49.6% were married-couple households, 7.7% were cohabiting couple households, 27.7% had a female householder with no partner present, and 15.0% had a male householder with no partner present. About 18.1% of all households were made up of individuals and 8.9% had someone living alone who was 65 years of age or older; the average household size was 3.19. There were 7,676 families (77.0% of all households).

There were 10,296 housing units at an average density of 1,567.8 units per square mile (605.3 units/km^{2}), of which 3.2% were vacant. Of the 9,970 occupied units, 55.9% were owner-occupied and 44.1% were occupied by renters.

99.2% of residents lived in urban areas, while 0.8% lived in rural areas.

Racial composition as of the 2020 census
Race	Number	Percent
White	12,984	40.6%
Black or African American	1,094	3.4%
American Indian and Alaska Native	972	3.0%
Asian	1,779	5.6%
Native Hawaiian and Other Pacific Islander	81	0.3%
Some other race	8,928	27.9%
Two or more races	6,132	19.2%
Hispanic or Latino (of any race)	19,042	59.6%

=== 2010 census ===
At the 2010 census Atwater had a population of 28,168. The population density was 4,620.8 inhabitants per square mile (1,784.1/km^{2}). The racial makeup of Atwater was 18,410 (65.4%) White, 14,808 (52.6%) Hispanic or Latino of any race, 1,225 (4.3%) African American, 364 (1.3%) Native American, 1,416 (5.0%) Asian, 76 (0.3%) Pacific Islander, 5,300 (18.8%) from other races, and 1,377 (4.9%) from two or more races.

The census reported that 28,066 people (99.6% of the population) lived in households, 31 (0.1%) lived in non-institutionalized group quarters, and 71 (0.3%) were institutionalized.

There were 8,838 households, 4,255 (48.1%) had children under the age of 18 living in them, 4,593 (52.0%) were opposite-sex married couples living together, 1,558 (17.6%) had a female householder with no husband present, 672 (7.6%) had a male householder with no wife present. There were 615 (7.0%) unmarried opposite-sex partnerships, and 60 (0.7%) same-sex married couples or partnerships. 1,615 households (18.3%) were one person and 738 (8.4%) had someone living alone who was 65 or older. The average household size was 3.18. There were 6,823 families (77.2% of households); the average family size was 3.61.

The age distribution was 9,016 people (32.0%) under the age of 18, 2,968 people (10.5%) aged 18 to 24, 7,492 people (26.6%) aged 25 to 44, 5,760 people (20.4%) aged 45 to 64, and 2,932 people (10.4%) who were 65 or older. The median age was 30.0 years. For every 100 females, there were 95.7 males. For every 100 females age 18 and over, there were 90.5 males.

There were 9,771 housing units at an average density of 1,602.9 per square mile, of the occupied units 4,905 (55.5%) were owner-occupied and 3,933 (44.5%) were rented. The homeowner vacancy rate was 3.3%; the rental vacancy rate was 10.9%. 14,920 people (53.0% of the population) lived in owner-occupied housing units and 13,146 people (46.7%) lived in rental housing units.

=== 2023 American Community Survey ===
In 2023, the US Census Bureau estimated that 22.2% of the population were foreign-born. Of all people aged 5 or older, 52.5% spoke only English at home, 41.3% spoke Spanish, 3.0% spoke other Indo-European languages, and 3.2% spoke Asian or Pacific Islander languages. Of those aged 25 or older, 73.8% were high school graduates and 13.1% had a bachelor's degree.

The median household income in 2023 was $63,945, and the per capita income was $30,133. About 17.9% of families and 20.0% of the population were below the poverty line.

== Government ==
In the California State Legislature, Atwater is in the 14th senatorial district, represented by Democrat Anna Caballero, and in the 27th Assembly district, represented by Democrat Esmeralda Soria.

In the United States House of Representatives, Atwater is in California's 13th congressional district, represented by Democrat Adam Gray.

== Education ==
=== Primary and secondary schools ===
==== Public schools ====
Most of the city is zoned to the Atwater Elementary School District. Schools of AESD within Atwater and serving Atwater include:

- K-6
  - Aileen Colburn Elementary School
  - Shaffer Elementary School
  - Thomas Olaeta Elementary School
  - Elmer Wood Elementary School
  - Mitchell K-6 Elementary School
  - Peggy Heller Elementary School
  - Bellevue Elementary School
- 7–8
  - Mitchell Senior Elementary School
  - Bellevue Senior Elementary School
  - Peggy Heller Junior High School
- High School
  - Atwater High School
  - Buhach Colony High School
- Other
  - Atwater Valley Community Day School
  - Atwater Senior Academy

A small section of eastern Atwater is located in the Merced City School District; that section is zoned to Rudolph Rivera Middle School. Franklin Elementary School is the closest elementary school to the section of Atwater.

Merced Union High School District operates Atwater High School and Buhach Colony High School, both of which serve and reside in Atwater.

==== Private schools ====
School	Grades
Ariel Dear Academy	2–12
Fruitland Christian Preschool	PK-K
Landmark Christian School	PK-12
St. Anthony School	PK-8

== Newspapers ==
Atwater currently does not have a daily newspaper, although many of its residents use the daily paper, the Merced Sun-Star, which is published in nearby Merced. Additionally Atwater residents rely on local Facebook pages such as "Merced County news". Atwater has two weekly newspapers called The Atwater Signal and The Atwater Times. The Atwater Signal was first published in 1911. The Atwater Times is published by Mid Valley Publications, once a week.

== Notable people ==
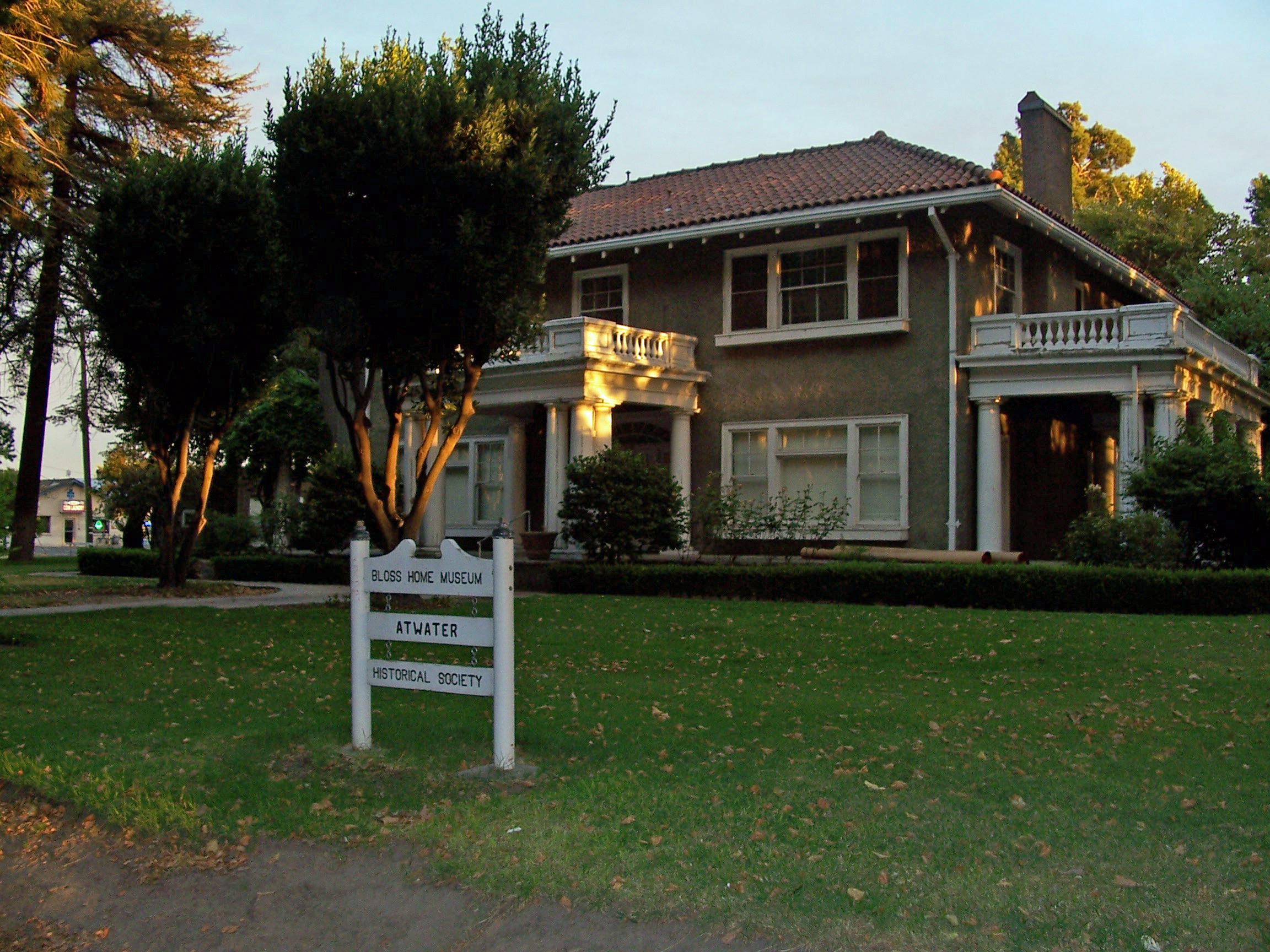
Bloss House Museum

- Bernard Berrian, NFL Chicago Bears, Minnesota Vikings wide receiver
- Chuck Compton, NFL Green Bay Packers defensive back
- Jamill Kelly, 2004 Olympics silver medal in wrestling
- Sheryl Underwood, actress
- Willow Wisp, experimental Gothic/metal band

== Sports ==
- Atwater Aviators, of the Golden State Collegiate Baseball League
- Atwater Falcons - football, basketball and baseball.
- Buhach Colony Thunder - football, basketball and baseball.

== See also ==
- List of cities and towns in California
