= Livingston, California =

City in California, United States

- City
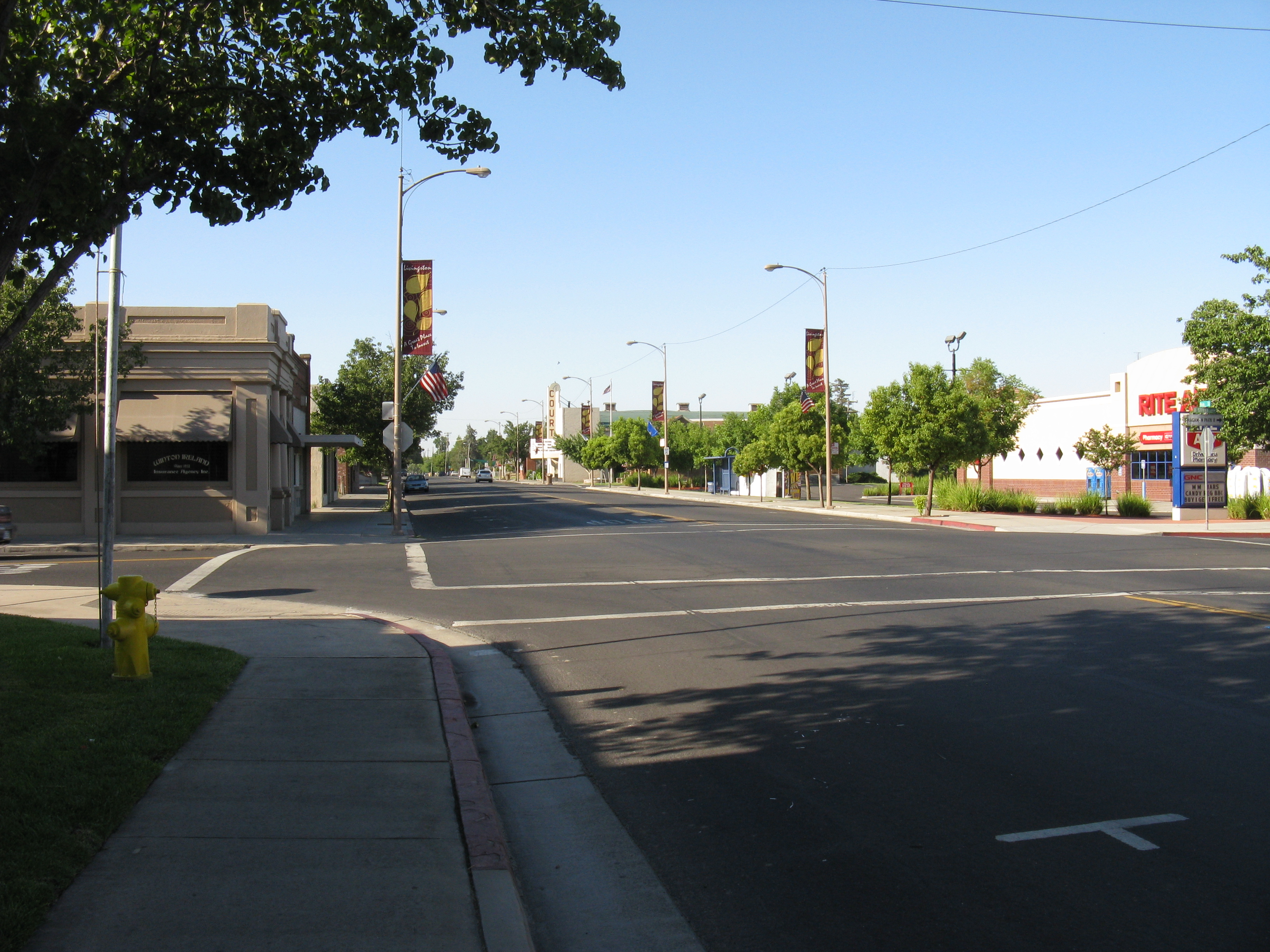
- Downtown Livingston in 2012
- Motto: The Last Stop
- Location within California Location within the United States
- Coordinates: 37°23′13″N 120°43′25″W
- Country: United States
- State: California
- County: Merced
- Incorporated: September 11, 1922

Government
  - Type: Council–manager
  - Mayor: Jose Moran (imcubent) Japjeet Singh Uppal (2026)

Area
  - Total: 3.678 sq mi (9.53 km^{2})
  - Land: 3.675 sq mi (9.52 km^{2})
  - Water: 0.003 sq mi (0.0078 km^{2}) 0.08%
- Elevation: 130 ft (40 m)

Population (2020)
  - Total: 14,172
  - Density: 3,856.3/sq mi (1,488.9/km^{2})
- Time zone: UTC-8 (Pacific (PST))
  - Summer (DST): UTC-7 (PDT)
- ZIP code: 95334
- Area code: 209
- FIPS code: 06-42006
- GNIS feature ID: 1656135
- Website: www.cityoflivingston.org

Livingston is a city in Merced County, California, United States. Livingston is located 7 miles (11 km) west-northwest of Atwater, at an elevation of 131 feet (40 m). According to the 2020 census, the city population was 14,172, now a estimate of 15,000 in 2026 as of now. Livingston's total area is 3.678 square miles (9.53 km^{2}), including undeveloped farmland annexed in anticipation of future growth.

== Location ==
Livingston is located in northern Merced County at 37°23′13″N 120°43′25″W. The city lies in the northern San Joaquin Valley at an elevation of 131 feet (40 m), approximately 7 miles (11 km) west-northwest of Atwater and 15 miles (24 km) northwest of Merced. The Southern Pacific Railroad passes through the city near the Merced River, while State Route 99 provides the primary north–south transportation corridor through Livingston, connecting it to neighboring communities throughout the Central Valley.

According to the United States Census Bureau, the city has a total area of 3.678 square miles (9.53 km²), including undeveloped farmland annexed in anticipation of future growth.

== History ==
The Livingston post office opened in 1873, closed in 1882, and re-opened in 1883. The town was named for Dr. David Livingstone, a Scottish explorer of Africa who was an international celebrity in the late 1800s. An error on the town's post office application resulted in the difference in spelling between his name and the town's.

== Agriculture ==
Livingston is located in California's fertile San Joaquin Valley, where agriculture has been the backbone of the local economy for generations. The region's hot, dry summers, mild winters, and reliable irrigation from the Merced River and other water sources create ideal conditions for year-round farming. Its sandy, well-drained soils, formed by deposits from the Merced River, are especially well suited for growing sweet potatoes and grapes.

Agriculture continues to be Livingston's leading industry. The city is home to major agricultural employers, including Foster Farms, one of the largest poultry producers in the western United States, and Joseph Gallo Farms, which operates one of the nation's largest dairy herds. The Livingston area also produces and packs approximately 90 percent of all sweet potatoes grown west of the Rocky Mountains.

Beyond sweet potatoes, farms surrounding Livingston grow grapes for wine, raisins, and fresh table consumption. E. & J. Gallo Winery operates a grape-processing facility near the city, supporting the region's viticulture industry. Almond orchards are another major agricultural feature of the area, while smaller quantities of alfalfa, corn, soybeans, peaches, melons, berries, and turf are also cultivated.

== Schools ==
Livingston Union School District serves 2,400 children in and around Livingston. The district operates three elementary schools, Campus Park Elementary School, Selma Herndon Elementary School, and Yamato Colony Elementary School. Most elementary-age children are within walking distance of each school. All three elementary schools offer some form of two-way immersion instruction designed to build proficiency in both English and Spanish. Livingston Middle School serves grades 6–8.

Livingston High School is part of Merced Union High School District and serves all of Livingston as well as students from the nearby towns of Ballico and Cressey. In years past, most students from Delhi attended Livingston High School until Delhi opened its own high school, Delhi High School, in 1998. Livingston High School's foreign language department offers classes in Spanish and Punjabi. Longview Mennonite School serves many Mennonite students in the area.

In the 1990s, Livingston schools were at the center of a controversy involving Sikh students' right to wear ceremonial daggers known as kirpans under clothing while at school. In 1995, a Federal appellate court affirmed the right to wear the kirpan if certain safety precautions are followed. There was also another scandals in LHS where in 2011, a science teacher was arrested after being accused of providing students with chloroform and later of possessing explosives. She was subsequently sentenced to probation and lost her teaching credential. In 2012, an agriculture teacher was charged with sexually abusing a 15-year-old student. Both cases received regional media coverage.

== Newspapers ==
The Livingston Chronicle is a weekly newspaper delivered on Saturdays. The Chronicle publishes local happenings, especially Livingston High School academic and athletic events. The Merced Sun-Star and Modesto Bee are also widely read and cover Livingston news and events. All three newspapers are owned by the McClatchy Company. The San Francisco Chronicle is also available throughout the city.

== Parks and recreation ==
Livingston maintains a number of public parks and recreational facilities, including Memorial Park, Arakelian Park, Joseph Gallo Park, Max Foster Sports Complex, Singh Park, and Don Meyer Park. These parks provide playgrounds, picnic areas, sports fields, walking paths, and community gathering spaces.

The city's Recreation Department organizes youth sports leagues, swimming programs, community classes, and annual events such as the Sweet Potato Festival, Fall Street Fair, Kite Festival, Trunk or Treat, and the Court of Trees Christmas Parade.

Livingston is also home to the Livingston Historical Museum, which preserves artifacts and documents related to the city's history and agricultural heritage.

== Churches ==
Places of worship in Livingston and the immediately surrounding area include St. Jude's Thaddeus a Catholic church, an Apostolic Assembly, an Assemblies of God church, a Southern Baptist church, a Church of Christ, Lutheran and United Methodist churches, a Mennonite church, a United Pentecostal Church, and two Sikh Gurdwaras.

== Demographics ==
Historical population
Census	Pop.	Note	%±
1930	803		—
1940	895		11.5%
1950	1,502		67.8%
1960	2,188		45.7%
1970	2,588		18.3%
1980	5,326		105.8%
1990	7,317		37.4%
2000	10,473		43.1%
2010	13,058		24.7%
2020	14,172		8.5%
U.S. Decennial Census

=== Heritage ===
Livingston's population reflects a diverse range of cultural and ethnic backgrounds. The city has large communities with roots in Mexico, particularly the states of Michoacán, Yucatán, Chihuahua, Veracruz, Sinaloa, Jalisco, and Oaxaca, as well as Central American countries including Guatemala, El Salvador, and Honduras. Residents also include people from other parts of the United States, including members of the Cherokee Nation.

The city has significant Portuguese, Indian, Pakistani, Japanese, Mennonite, Armenian, Hmong, Cambodian, Vietnamese, Filipino, and Chinese communities. Many Portuguese residents trace their ancestry to the Azores, Angola, and Brazil, and approximately 10 percent of residents speak Portuguese. Livingston is home to one of the largest Sikh communities in the United States and also has sizable Hindu and Muslim populations. The city's Japanese community, many of whom trace their ancestry to Wakayama Prefecture, played an important role in local agriculture through the Livingston Farmers' Association.

=== Racial and ethnic composition ===
Livingston, California – Racial and Ethnic Composition (NH = Non-Hispanic) Note: the US Census treats Hispanic/Latino as an ethnic category. This table excludes Latinos from the racial categories and assigns them to a separate category. Hispanics/Latinos may be of any race.
Race / Ethnicity	Pop 2000	Pop 2010	Pop 2020	% 2000	% 2010	% 2020
White alone (NH)	1,065	1,039	930	10.17%	7.96%	6.56%
Black or African American alone (NH)	62	60	95	0.59%	0.46%	0.67%
Native American or Alaska Native alone (NH)	34	37	52	0.32%	0.28%	0.37%
Asian alone (NH)	1,487	2,193	2,978	14.2%	16.79%	21.01%
Pacific Islander alone (NH)	3	16	19	0.03%	0.12%	0.13%
Some Other Race alone (NH)	51	28	34	0.49%	0.21%	0.24%
Mixed Race/Multi-Racial (NH)	250	138	128	2.39%	1.06%	0.9%
Hispanic or Latino (any race)	7,521	9,547	9,936	71.81%	73.11%	70.11%
Total	10,473	13,058	14,172	100%	100%	100%

=== 2020 census ===
As of the 2020 census, Livingston had a population of 14,172 and a population density of 3,856.3 inhabitants per square mile (1,488.9/km^{2}).

The age distribution was 28.1% under the age of 18, 10.6% aged 18 to 24, 27.9% aged 25 to 44, 22.4% aged 45 to 64, and 10.9% who were 65 years of age or older. The median age was 32.2 years. For every 100 females, there were 99.1 males, and for every 100 females age 18 and over there were 96.3 males age 18 and over.

The census reported that 99.9% of the population lived in households, 0.1% lived in non-institutionalized group quarters, and no one was institutionalized. 99.8% of residents lived in urban areas, while 0.2% lived in rural areas.

There were 3,644 households, out of which 55.1% included children under the age of 18. Of all households, 60.0% were married-couple households, 6.3% were cohabiting couple households, 22.0% had a female householder with no partner present, and 11.7% had a male householder with no partner present. 9.6% of households were one person, and 4.8% were one person aged 65 or older. The average household size was 3.89. There were 3,159 families (86.7% of all households).

There were 3,706 housing units at an average density of 1,008.4 units per square mile (389.3 units/km^{2}), of which 3,644 (98.3%) were occupied. Of the occupied units, 61.6% were owner-occupied and 38.4% were occupied by renters. The homeowner vacancy rate was 0.7%, and the rental vacancy rate was 0.6%.

=== 2023 ACS 5-year estimate ===
In 2023, the US Census Bureau estimated that the median household income was $76,158, and the per capita income was $22,911. About 14.3% of families and 15.8% of the population were below the poverty line.

=== 2010 census ===
At the 2010 census Livingston had a population of 13,058. The population density was 3,514.7 inhabitants per square mile (1,357.0/km^{2}). The racial makeup of Livingston was 5,263 (40.3%) White, 106 (0.8%) African American, 348 (2.7%) Native American, 2,223 (17.0%) Asian, 18 (0.1%) Pacific Islander, 4,547 (34.8%) from other races, and 553 (4.2%) from two or more races. Hispanic or Latino of any race were 9,547 persons (73.1%).

The census reported that 13,054 people (100% of the population) lived in households, 4 (0%) lived in non-institutionalized group quarters, and no one was institutionalized.

There were 3,156 households, 1,907 (100%) had children under the age of 18 living in them, 2,014 (63.8%) were opposite-sex married couples living together, 501 (15.9%) had a female householder with no husband present, 288 (9.1%) had a male householder with no wife present. There were 199 (6.3%) unmarried opposite-sex partnerships, and 19 (0.6%) same-sex married couples or partnerships. 277 households (8.8%) were one person and 112 (3.5%) had someone living alone who was 65 or older. The average household size was 4.14. There were 2,803 families (88.8% of households); the average family size was 4.32.

The age distribution was 4,254 people (32.6%) under the age of 18, 1,783 people (13.7%) aged 18 to 24, 3,605 people (27.6%) aged 25 to 44, 2,499 people (19.1%) aged 45 to 64, and 917 people (7.0%) who were 65 or older. The median age was 27.4 years. For every 100 females, there were 102.1 males. For every 100 females age 18 and over, there were 102.0 males.

There were 3,320 housing units at an average density of 893.6 per square mile, of the occupied units 1,923 (60.9%) were owner-occupied and 1,233 (39.1%) were rented. The homeowner vacancy rate was 2.1%; the rental vacancy rate was 3.7%. 7,849 people (60.1% of the population) lived in owner-occupied housing units and 5,205 people (39.9%) lived in rental housing units.

== Government ==
Livingston uses a council–manager form of government with a five-member city council, including the mayor of the city. As of March 2024, the current mayor of Livingston is Jose A. Moran.

In the California State Legislature, Livingston is in the 14th senatorial district, represented by Democrat Anna Caballero, and in the 27th Assembly district, represented by Democrat Esmeralda Soria.

In the United States House of Representatives, Livingston is in California's 13th congressional district, represented by Democrat Adam Gray.

== Sister city ==
- - Oga, Akita Prefecture, Japan
- Churintzio, Michoacan, Mexico

== See also ==
- List of cities in California
- Merced River
- Merced County, California
