= Merced City School District =

School district in California, United States

Address
- 444 West 23rd Street Merced, California, 95340; United States

District information
- Type: Public
- Grades: K–8
- NCES District ID: 0624600

Students and staff
- Students: 10,800
- Teachers: 423.47
- Staff: 517.71
- Student–teacher ratio: 25.5

Other information
- Website: www.mercedcsd.org

Merced City School District (MCSD) is a school district in California, United States. Its headquarters are in Merced.

== History ==
Diana Jimenez served as the superintendent beginning in July 2022, and until 2023, when all of the board members agreed to end her term.

== Demographics ==
In the 2008–2009 school year, the district had 2,211 native Spanish speaking students who were classified as English learners, making up 74% of the district's population of English learners. The district also had 1,107 native Spanish speaking students who were proficient in English. The second largest English learner demographic, native Hmong speakers, had 628 students, making up 21% of the district's English learner population. The district also had 291 students who spoke Hmong as a first language and who were proficient in English.

In January 1983, 10% of the student body of the MCSD was Asian. Most of those students were ethnic Hmong refugees. In a span of less than two years ending in January 1983, over 750 refugee Hmong and Laotian students entered the MCSD. Dave Small, the superintendent of the MCSD, said that the number is "the size of one school—a good-sized school at that."

== Schools ==
=== Middle schools ===
- Cruickshank Middle School
- Hoover Middle School
- Rivera Middle School
- Tenaya Middle School

=== Elementary schools ===
- Burbank
- Chenoweth
- Community Day
- Franklin
- Fremont
- Givens
- Gracey
- Muir
- Peterson
- Reyes
- Sheehy
- Stefani
- Stowell
- Wright
