= Atwater Elementary School District =

School district in California, United States

Address
- 1401 Broadway Avenue Atwater, California, 95301; United States

District information
- Type: Public
- Grades: K–8
- NCES District ID: 0603420

Students and staff
- Students: 4,815
- Teachers: 210.71
- Staff: 246.68
- Student–teacher ratio: 22.85

Other information
- Website: www.aesd.edu

Atwater Elementary School District (AESD) is a school district in California. Its headquarters are in Atwater.

== Schools ==
Middle

- Mitchell Senior Elementary School (grades 7–8)
- Bellevue Senior Elementary School (grades 7–8)
- Peggy Heller Senior Elementary School (grades 7–8)

Elementary

- Bellevue Elementary School
- Aileen Colburn Elementary School
- Peggy Heller Elementary School
- Mitchell K-6 Elementary School
- Thomas Olaeta Elementary School
- Shaffer Elementary School
- Elmer Wood Elementary School
- Juniper Elementary School

Alternative

- Atwater Senior Academy (grades 6–8)
