= Central California Conference =

The Central California Conference is a high school sports league in Central California. It comprises six schools in the Stanislaus and Merced County area. The league is administered by the California Interscholastic Federation (CIF) Sac-Joaquin Section.

== Member schools ==
- Atwater High School
- Buhach Colony High School
- Central Valley High School
- El Capitan High School
- Golden Valley High School
- Merced High School
- Patterson High School
