= Atwater High School =

Public high school in California, United States

Location
- 2201 Fruitland Avenue; Atwater, (Merced County), California 95301; United States; 37°21′55″N 120°36′58″W

Information
- School type: Public, High School
- School district: Merced Union High School District
- NCES District ID: 0624660
- CEEB code: 050172
- NCES School ID: 062466003699
- Principal: Alexie Parle
- Teaching staff: 99.24 (FTE)
- Grades: 9–12
- Enrollment: 2,051 (2023–2024)
- Student to teacher ratio: 20.67
- Campus: Suburban
- Colors: Royal blue and white
- Athletics conference: Central California Conference
- Mascot: Falcon
- Website: ahs.muhsd.org

Atwater High School is a secondary school in Atwater, California, United States. It is a part of the Merced Union High School District. AHS competes as a member of the Central California Conference of the Sac-Joaquin Section.

== Notable alumni ==
- Bernard Berrian, NFL wide receiver
- Carrie Henn, child actress in the 1986 film Aliens
- Larry Howard, MLB catcher
- Jamill Kelly, Olympic silver medalist in freestyle wrestling
- Blas Minor, MLB pitcher
- Bill Mooneyham, MLB pitcher
