= Merced High School =

Location
- 205 W. Olive Ave; Merced, California; United States; 37.3205°N 120.4734°W

Information
- Type: High School
- Motto: Home of Champions and Scholars
- Established: March 14, 1922
- School district: Merced Union High School District
- Superintendent: Alan Peterson
- Principal: Marcus Knott
- Staff: 84.93 (FTE)
- Grades: 9–12
- Enrollment: 1,951 (2023-2024)
- Student to teacher ratio: 22.97
- Color
- Athletics conference: Central California Conference
- Mascot: Grizzly Bear
- Rivals: Golden Valley High School
- Accreditation: WASC
- Newspaper: The Scholar
- Website: mhs.muhsd.org

Merced High School is located in Merced, California, United States. It is a part of the Merced Union High School District.

The current enrollment is over 1,800 students in grades 9 through 12. The school is currently under Principal Marcus Knott and Associate Principals Kim Berman, Jennifer Nordman, Kelly Silva, and Pa Houa.

== Academics ==
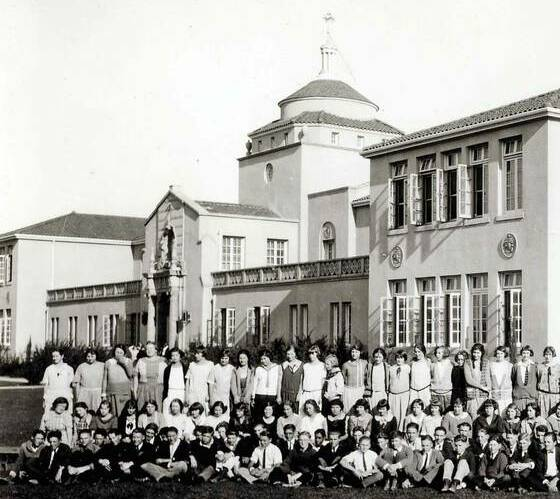
The original Spanish Colonial Revival style campus, built in 1922 and demolished in 1974.

The Merced High School Advanced Placement program is open for any student who wishes to be challenged in the fields of chemistry, English, physics, government, Spanish, biology, calculus, statistics, and studio art. The teachers at Merced High School try to ensure that their students work their hardest, which explains the high percentage of students who pass the Advanced Placement examinations with a score of 3, 4, or 5. Merced High School's Advanced Placement exam and test scores have earned it a place among the Top 1300 schools in the United States by Newsweek magazine. The school has also earned a Bronze Award from U.S. News & World Report, having been cited as one of the top 1,800 schools in the United States.

The Merced High Academic Decathlon team took the title of Merced County Champions (10 years in a row 2009-2018) and competed in Sacramento in March 2015, coming in 51st place in the state of California.

== Special programs ==
The school has the Newcomer Program for newly arrived immigrants. As of February 2006, 80 students from Southeast Asia were a part of the program. Many of them were refugees from the Thamkabok refugee camp in Thailand. Many had never had formal education before, did not know how to use writing utensils, and did not know how to write their own names.

== Student life ==
As of 2006, the school has an Asian Club, which has over 100 members. It is one of the largest groups at Merced High School. The Asian Club takes end of the year school trips and holds fundraising and social events.

== Athletics ==
Merced High School produced the 2015-2016 Gatorade National Softball Player of the Year. Madilyn Nickles received this award as the top high school softball player in America.

== Demographics ==
By January 1983, Merced High School North Campus had suddenly received over 200 Hmong refugee students, with almost all of them in English as a second language (ESL) programs. Between the northern hemisphere spring of 1982 and January 1983, the school doubled the size of its ESL program. A former assistant principal at Merced High North said that many of the Hmong students valued education and had almost perfect school attendance.

== Notable alumni ==
- Margaret Dingeldein – member of the United States women's national water polo team during the 2004 Summer Olympics
- Marvin Eastman – mixed martial arts fighter
- Duke Fergerson – NFL football player for the Seattle Seahawks and the Buffalo Bills
- Jerry Garvin – professional baseball player for the Toronto Blue Jays
- Brian Fuentes – professional baseball player
- Eric A. McAfee – entrepreneur, venture capitalist, and philanthropist
- Tony Slaton – NFL football player for the Los Angeles Rams and Dallas Cowboys
- Jesse Thompson – professional football player
- Thad Tillotson – professional baseball player
- Rick Williams – professional baseball player
- Lloyd Winston – professional football player
- Cary Stayner – serial killer
