= Livingston High School (California) =

Public secondary school in Livingston, California, United States

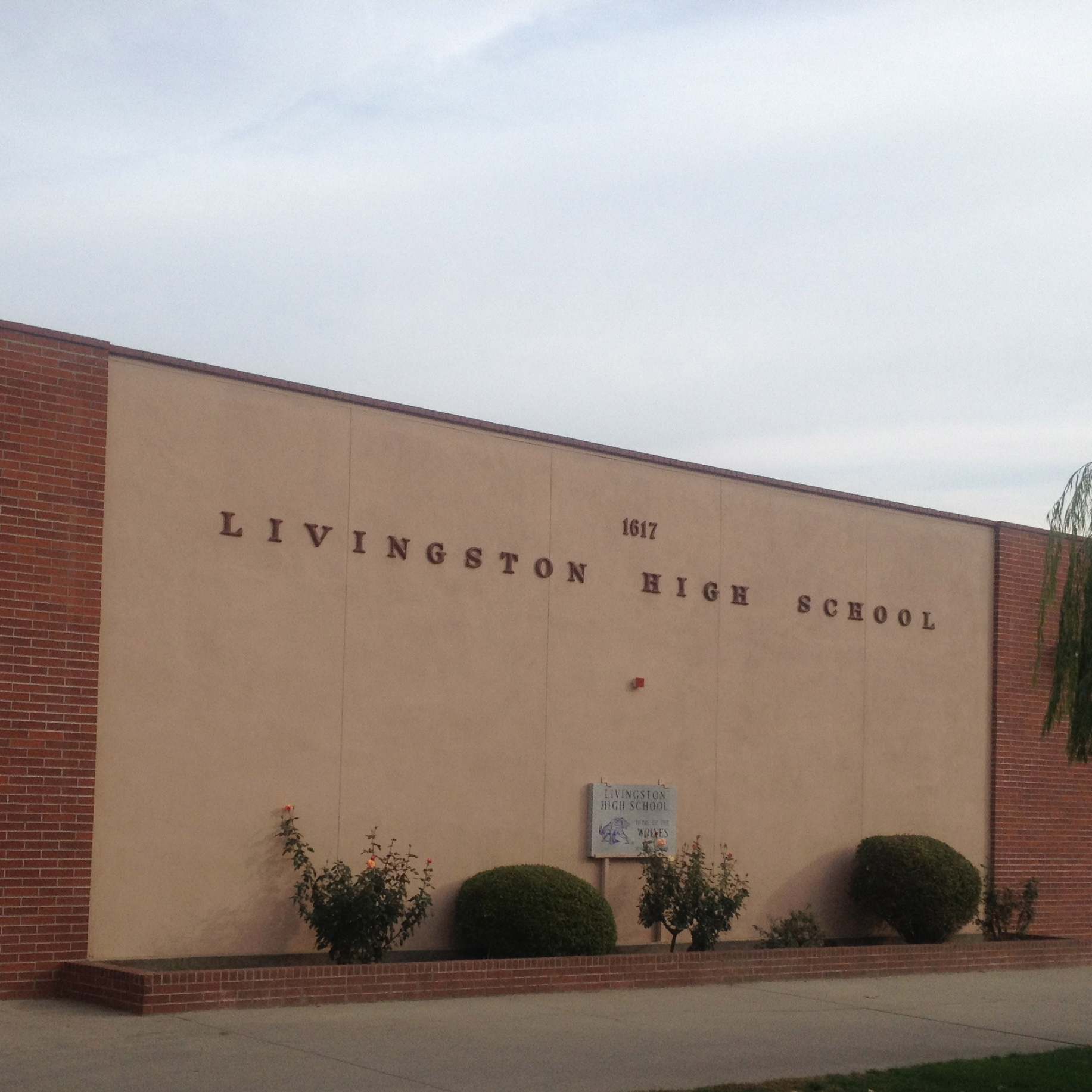

Location
- 1617 Main Street. Livingston, California, 95334; United States; 37.3756°N 120.723°W

Information
- Type: Public
- School district: Merced Union High School District
- Principal: Nicole Rose
- Staff: 59 (FTE)
- Faculty: 56(on FTE basis)
- Grades: 9 to 12
- Enrollment: 1,154 (2025-2026)
- Student to teacher ratio: 19.58
- Color
- Mascot: Wolf/Wolves
- Team name: Livingston Wolves
- Website: lhs.muhsd.org

Livingston High School, in Livingston, California, United States, is a public secondary school in the Merced Union High School District. The school contains grades 9-12. Students come from Livingston Middle School and Ballico Middle School.

== Administration ==
As of the 2026–2027 school year, the principal of Livingston High School is Nicole Rose, who succeeded Charles Jolly (former during 2010s-20s). The associate principals are Anthony Blaine (Student Support), Manpreet Dola (Teaching and Learning), and Briana Escalera (Counseling).

== Scandals ==
In May 2011, a science teacher was arrested for helping students get intoxicated through the use of chloroform that she ordered through the school for her "lessons". A few days later, she was arrested for possession of explosives. In September 2011, she was released on bail with an ankle monitor. In December 2011, she was sentenced to four years of probation, and her teaching credential was revoked.

In May 2012, an agriculture teacher was charged with having had sex with a 15-year-old student in 2010 and 2011.

== Courses ==
Classes at Livingston High School are typically scheduled in periods of approximately one hour. The curriculum includes core subjects such as English, mathematics, science, and social science, along with electives including foreign language, art, photography, and band. The school also offers Regional Occupational Program (ROP) courses in areas such as medical, business, education, and computer-related fields.

Livingston High School offers Advanced Placement (AP) courses, which are college-level classes administered by the College Board. AP courses offered include:

- AP Biology
- AP Calculus AB
- AP Chemistry
- AP Cybersecurity
- AP English Language and Composition
- AP English Literature and Composition
- AP United States Government and Politics
- AP Spanish Language and Culture
- AP Statistics
- AP United States History
