= Zygocerini =

Scientific classification
- Kingdom: Animalia
- Phylum: Arthropoda
- Class: Insecta
- Order: Coleoptera
- Suborder: Polyphaga
- Infraorder: Cucujiformia
- Family: Cerambycidae
- Subfamily: Lamiinae
- Tribe: Zygocerini; Lacordaire, 1872

Tribe of beetles

Zygocerini is a tribe of longhorn beetles of the subfamily Lamiinae. It was described by Lacordaire in 1872.

== Taxonomy ==
Zygocerini contains the following genera:

- Annemabel Slipinski & Escalona, 2013
- Calezygocera Vives & Sudre, 2013
- Carteridion Slipinski & Escalona, 2013
- Demonassa Thomson, 1864
- Disterna Thomson, 1864
- Falsotmesisternus Breuning, 1961
- Pseudozygocera Breuning, 1948
- Scapozygocera Breuning, 1947
- Scapozygoceropsis Breuning, 1973
- Thyada Pascoe, 1863
- Zygocera Erichson, 1842
