= Zygocera freyi =

Scientific classification
- Kingdom: Animalia
- Phylum: Arthropoda
- Class: Insecta
- Order: Coleoptera
- Suborder: Polyphaga
- Infraorder: Cucujiformia
- Family: Cerambycidae
- Genus: Zygocera
- Species: Z. freyi

Binomial name
- Zygocera freyi (Breuning, 1956)

Species of beetle

Zygocera freyi is a species of beetle in the family Cerambycidae. It was described by Stephan von Breuning in 1956. It is known from Australia.
