= Demonassa (beetle) =

Scientific classification
- Kingdom: Animalia
- Phylum: Arthropoda
- Clade: Pancrustacea
- Class: Insecta
- Order: Coleoptera
- Suborder: Polyphaga
- Infraorder: Cucujiformia
- Family: Cerambycidae
- Tribe: Zygocerini
- Genus: Demonassa; Thomson, 1864

Synonyms
- Tuberozygocera Breuning, 1974

Genus of beetles

Demonassa is a genus of longhorn beetles of the subfamily Lamiinae.

== Species ==
Demonassa contains the following species:

- Demonassa albostictica (Breuning, 1974)
- Demonassa capitalis Blackburn, 1908
- Demonassa dichotoma (Newman, 1851)
- Demonassa marmorata Breuning, 1939
