= Disterna spinipennis =

Scientific classification
- Kingdom: Animalia
- Phylum: Arthropoda
- Class: Insecta
- Order: Coleoptera
- Suborder: Polyphaga
- Infraorder: Cucujiformia
- Family: Cerambycidae
- Genus: Disterna
- Species: D. spinipennis

Binomial name
- Disterna spinipennis Breuning, 1960

Synonyms
- Zygoceropsis spinipennis Breuning, 1960

Species of beetle

Disterna spinipennis is a species of beetle in the family Cerambycidae. It was described by Stephan von Breuning in 1960. It is known from Australia.
