= Disterna mastersii =

Scientific classification
- Domain: Eukaryota
- Kingdom: Animalia
- Phylum: Arthropoda
- Class: Insecta
- Order: Coleoptera
- Suborder: Polyphaga
- Infraorder: Cucujiformia
- Family: Cerambycidae
- Genus: Disterna
- Species: D. mastersii

Binomial name
- Disterna mastersii Pascoe, 1871

Synonyms
- Disterna mastersi Pascoe, 1871; Zygocera mastersii (Pascoe, 1871)

Species of beetle

Disterna mastersii is a species of beetle in the family Cerambycidae. It was described by Francis Polkinghorne Pascoe in 1871. It is known from Australia.
