= Scapozygocera ochreifrons =

Scientific classification
- Kingdom: Animalia
- Phylum: Arthropoda
- Class: Insecta
- Order: Coleoptera
- Suborder: Polyphaga
- Infraorder: Cucujiformia
- Family: Cerambycidae
- Genus: Scapozygocera
- Species: S. ochreifrons

Binomial name
- Scapozygocera ochreifrons Breuning, 1965

Species of beetle

Scapozygocera ochreifrons is a species of beetle in the family Cerambycidae. It was described by Stephan von Breuning in 1965.
