= Disterna luctuosa =

Scientific classification
- Domain: Eukaryota
- Kingdom: Animalia
- Phylum: Arthropoda
- Class: Insecta
- Order: Coleoptera
- Suborder: Polyphaga
- Infraorder: Cucujiformia
- Family: Cerambycidae
- Genus: Disterna
- Species: D. luctuosa

Binomial name
- Disterna luctuosa Pascoe, 1862

Synonyms
- Zygocera luctuosa Pascoe, 1862

Species of beetle

Disterna luctuosa is a species of beetle in the family Cerambycidae. It was described by Francis Polkinghorne Pascoe in 1862. It is known from Australia.
