= Zygocera albostictica =

Scientific classification
- Kingdom: Animalia
- Phylum: Arthropoda
- Class: Insecta
- Order: Coleoptera
- Suborder: Polyphaga
- Infraorder: Cucujiformia
- Family: Cerambycidae
- Genus: Zygocera
- Species: Z. albostictica

Binomial name
- Zygocera albostictica (Breuning, 1939)

Synonyms
- Disternopsis albostictica Breuning, 1939

Species of beetle

Zygocera albostictica is a species of beetle in the family Cerambycidae. It was first described by Austrian entomologist Stephan von Breuning in 1939 as Disternopsis albostictica. It was transferred to the genus, Zygocera, in 2013 by Adam Slipinski and Hermes E. Escalona.

It is known from Australia.
