= Demonassa dichotoma =

Scientific classification
- Domain: Eukaryota
- Kingdom: Animalia
- Phylum: Arthropoda
- Class: Insecta
- Order: Coleoptera
- Suborder: Polyphaga
- Infraorder: Cucujiformia
- Family: Cerambycidae
- Genus: Demonassa
- Species: D. dichotoma

Binomial name
- Demonassa dichotoma (Newman, 1851)

Species of beetle

Demonassa dichotoma is a species of beetle in the family Cerambycidae. It was described by Newman in 1851. It is known from Australia.
