= Zygocera metallica =

Scientific classification
- Kingdom: Animalia
- Phylum: Arthropoda
- Class: Insecta
- Order: Coleoptera
- Suborder: Polyphaga
- Infraorder: Cucujiformia
- Family: Cerambycidae
- Genus: Zygocera
- Species: Z. metallica

Binomial name
- Zygocera metallica Westwood, 1863

Species of beetle

Zygocera metallica is a species of beetle in the family Cerambycidae. It was described by John O. Westwood in 1863. It is known from Australia.
