= Scapozygocera quadriplagiata =

Scientific classification
- Kingdom: Animalia
- Phylum: Arthropoda
- Class: Insecta
- Order: Coleoptera
- Suborder: Polyphaga
- Infraorder: Cucujiformia
- Family: Cerambycidae
- Genus: Scapozygocera
- Species: S. quadriplagiata

Binomial name
- Scapozygocera quadriplagiata Breuning, 1947

Species of beetle

Scapozygocera quadriplagiata is a species of beetle in the family Cerambycidae. It was described by Stephan von Breuning in 1947. It is known from Papua New Guinea.

== Subspecies ==
- Scapozygocera quadriplagiata quadriplagiata Breuning, 1947
- Scapozygocera quadriplagiata aruensis Breuning, 1959
