= Disterna nigromaculata =

Scientific classification
- Kingdom: Animalia
- Phylum: Arthropoda
- Class: Insecta
- Order: Coleoptera
- Suborder: Polyphaga
- Infraorder: Cucujiformia
- Family: Cerambycidae
- Genus: Disterna
- Species: D. nigromaculata

Binomial name
- Disterna nigromaculata Breuning, 1970

Synonyms
- Zygocera nigromaculata Breuning, 1970

Species of beetle

Disterna nigromaculata is a species of beetle in the family Cerambycidae. It was described by Stephan von Breuning in 1970. It is known from Australia.
