= Disterna concinna =

Scientific classification
- Domain: Eukaryota
- Kingdom: Animalia
- Phylum: Arthropoda
- Class: Insecta
- Order: Coleoptera
- Suborder: Polyphaga
- Infraorder: Cucujiformia
- Family: Cerambycidae
- Genus: Disterna
- Species: D. concinna

Binomial name
- Disterna concinna Blackburn, 1901

Synonyms
- Zygocera concinna Blackburn, 1901

Species of beetle

Disterna concinna is a species of beetle in the family Cerambycidae. It was described by Thomas Blackburn in 1901. It is known from Australia.
