= Zygocera =

Scientific classification
- Kingdom: Animalia
- Phylum: Arthropoda
- Class: Insecta
- Order: Coleoptera
- Suborder: Polyphaga
- Infraorder: Cucujiformia
- Family: Cerambycidae
- Tribe: Zygocerini
- Genus: Zygocera; Dejean, 1835

Synonyms
- Plocamocera Breuning, 1939; Disternopsis Breuning, 1939; Pseudodisterna Breuning, 1953

Genus of beetles

Zygocera is a genus of longhorn beetles of the subfamily Lamiinae.

== Species ==
Zygocera contains the following species:

- Zygocera albostictica (Breuning, 1939)
- Zygocera apicespinosa (Breuning, 1939)
- Zygocera bivittata (Breuning, 1939)
- Zygocera bivittipennis (Breuning, 1968)
- Zygocera freyi (Breuning, 1956)
- Zygocera metallica Westwood, 1863
- Zygocera pentheoides Pascoe, 1859
- Zygocera pruinosa (Boisduval, 1835)
