= Disterna tasmaniensis =

Scientific classification
- Kingdom: Animalia
- Phylum: Arthropoda
- Class: Insecta
- Order: Coleoptera
- Suborder: Polyphaga
- Infraorder: Cucujiformia
- Family: Cerambycidae
- Genus: Disterna
- Species: D. tasmaniensis

Binomial name
- Disterna tasmaniensis Breuning, 1982

Synonyms
- Zygoceropsis tasmaniensis Breuning, 1982

Species of beetle

Disterna tasmaniensis is a species of beetle in the family Cerambycidae. It was described by Stephan von Breuning in 1982. It is known from Tasmania.
