= Disterna atrofasciculata =

Scientific classification
- Domain: Eukaryota
- Kingdom: Animalia
- Phylum: Arthropoda
- Class: Insecta
- Order: Coleoptera
- Suborder: Polyphaga
- Infraorder: Cucujiformia
- Family: Cerambycidae
- Genus: Disterna
- Species: D. atrofasciculata

Binomial name
- Disterna atrofasciculata Aurivillius, 1916

Synonyms
- Zygocera atrofasciculata Aurivillius, 1916

Species of beetle

Disterna atrofasciculata is a species of beetle in the family Cerambycidae. It was described by Per Olof Christopher Aurivillius in 1916. It is known from Papua New Guinea.
