= Disterna canosa =

Scientific classification
- Kingdom: Animalia
- Phylum: Arthropoda
- Class: Insecta
- Order: Coleoptera
- Suborder: Polyphaga
- Infraorder: Cucujiformia
- Family: Cerambycidae
- Genus: Disterna
- Species: D. canosa

Binomial name
- Disterna canosa (Erichson, 1842)

Synonyms
- Zygocera lugubris Pascoe, 1863; Zygocera canosa (Erichson, 1842)

Species of beetle

Disterna canosa is a species of beetle in the family Cerambycidae. It was described by Wilhelm Ferdinand Erichson in 1842. It is known from Australia including Tasmania.
