= Scapozygocera =

Scientific classification
- Kingdom: Animalia
- Phylum: Arthropoda
- Class: Insecta
- Order: Coleoptera
- Suborder: Polyphaga
- Infraorder: Cucujiformia
- Family: Cerambycidae
- Tribe: Zygocerini
- Genus: Scapozygocera

Genus of beetles

Scapozygocera is a genus of longhorn beetles of the subfamily Lamiinae found in New Guinea, and contains the following species:

- Scapozygocera ochreifrons Breuning, 1965
- Scapozygocera quadriplagiata Breuning, 1947
