= Disterna cuneata =

Scientific classification
- Domain: Eukaryota
- Kingdom: Animalia
- Phylum: Arthropoda
- Class: Insecta
- Order: Coleoptera
- Suborder: Polyphaga
- Infraorder: Cucujiformia
- Family: Cerambycidae
- Genus: Disterna
- Species: D. cuneata

Binomial name
- Disterna cuneata Pascoe, 1863

Synonyms
- Zygocera cuneata Pascoe, 1863

Species of beetle

Disterna cuneata is a species of beetle in the family Cerambycidae. It was described by Francis Polkinghorne Pascoe in 1863. It is known from Australia.
