= Falsotmesisternus =

Scientific classification
- Kingdom: Animalia
- Phylum: Arthropoda
- Class: Insecta
- Order: Coleoptera
- Suborder: Polyphaga
- Infraorder: Cucujiformia
- Family: Cerambycidae
- Subfamily: Lamiinae
- Tribe: Zygocerini
- Genus: Falsotmesisternus; Breuning, 1961
- Species: F. zygoceroides

Binomial name
- Falsotmesisternus zygoceroides Breuning, 1961

Genus of beetles

Falsotmesisternus zygoceroides is a species of beetle in the family Cerambycidae, and the only species in the genus Falsotmesisternus. It was described by Stephan von Breuning in 1961.
