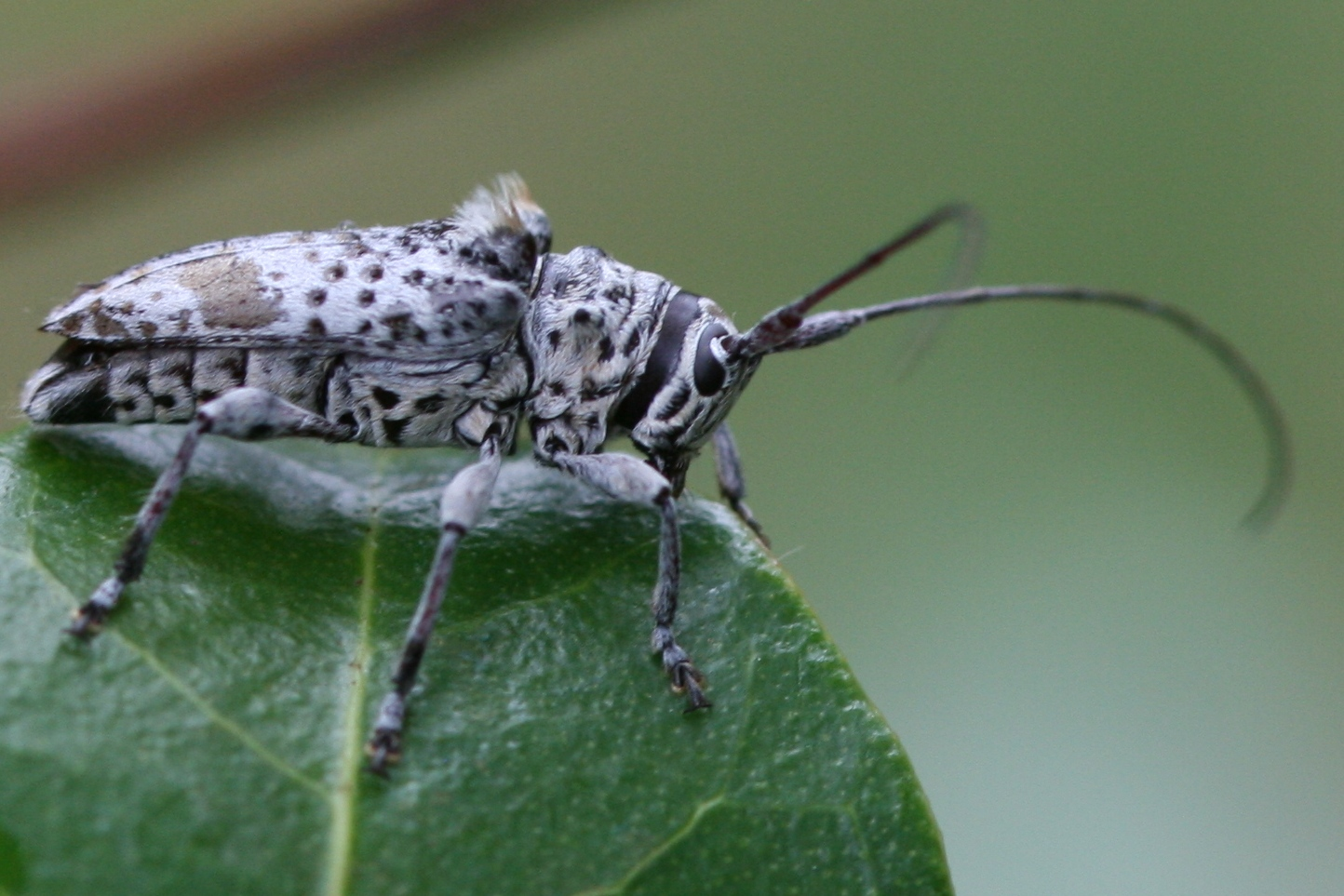
- Disterna plumifera

Scientific classification
- Domain: Eukaryota
- Kingdom: Animalia
- Phylum: Arthropoda
- Class: Insecta
- Order: Coleoptera
- Suborder: Polyphaga
- Infraorder: Cucujiformia
- Family: Cerambycidae
- Subfamily: Lamiinae
- Tribe: Zygocerini
- Genus: Disterna; Thomson, 1864

Synonyms
- Paradisterna Breuning, 1959; Zygoceropsis Breuning, 1960

= Disterna =

Genus of beetles

Disterna is a genus of longhorn beetles of the subfamily Lamiinae.

== Species ==
Disterna contains the following species:

- Disterna annulata (Breuning, 1939)
- Disterna atrofasciculata (Aurivillius, 1916)
- Disterna bifasciata (Pascoe, 1859)
- Disterna canosa (Erichson, 1842)
- Disterna complexa (Pascoe, 1859)
- Disterna concinna (Blackburn, 1901)
- Disterna cuneata (Pascoe, 1863)
- Disterna curta (Breuning, 1939)
- Disterna forrestensis McKeown, 1948
- Disterna luctuosa (Pascoe, 1862)
- Disterna maculata (McKeown, 1938)
- Disterna mastersii Pascoe, 1871
- Disterna nigromaculata (Breuning, 1970)
- Disterna norfolkensis (McKeown, 1938)
- Disterna ovalis (Breuning, 1939)
- Disterna papuana (Breuning, 1939)
- Disterna plumifera (Pascoe, 1859)
- Disterna pumila (Pascoe, 1859)
- Disterna similis (Breuning, 1939)
- Disterna spinipennis Breuning, 1960
- Disterna tasmaniensis Breuning, 1982
