= Annemabel =

Scientific classification
- Kingdom: Animalia
- Phylum: Arthropoda
- Clade: Pancrustacea
- Class: Insecta
- Order: Coleoptera
- Suborder: Polyphaga
- Infraorder: Cucujiformia
- Family: Cerambycidae
- Subfamily: Lamiinae
- Tribe: Zygocerini
- Genus: Annemabel; Slipinski & Escalona, 2013
- Species: A. elongata

Binomial name
- Annemabel elongata (Breuning, 1939)

Synonyms
- Zygocera elongata Breuning, 1939

Species of beetle

Annemabel is a monotypic genus of beetle in the family Cerambycidae. The sole species is Annemabel elongata.

Annemabel elongata was described by Stephan von Breuning in 1939 under the name Zygocera elongata. It is known from Australia. It measures 7–18 mm (0.28–0.71 in) in length.
