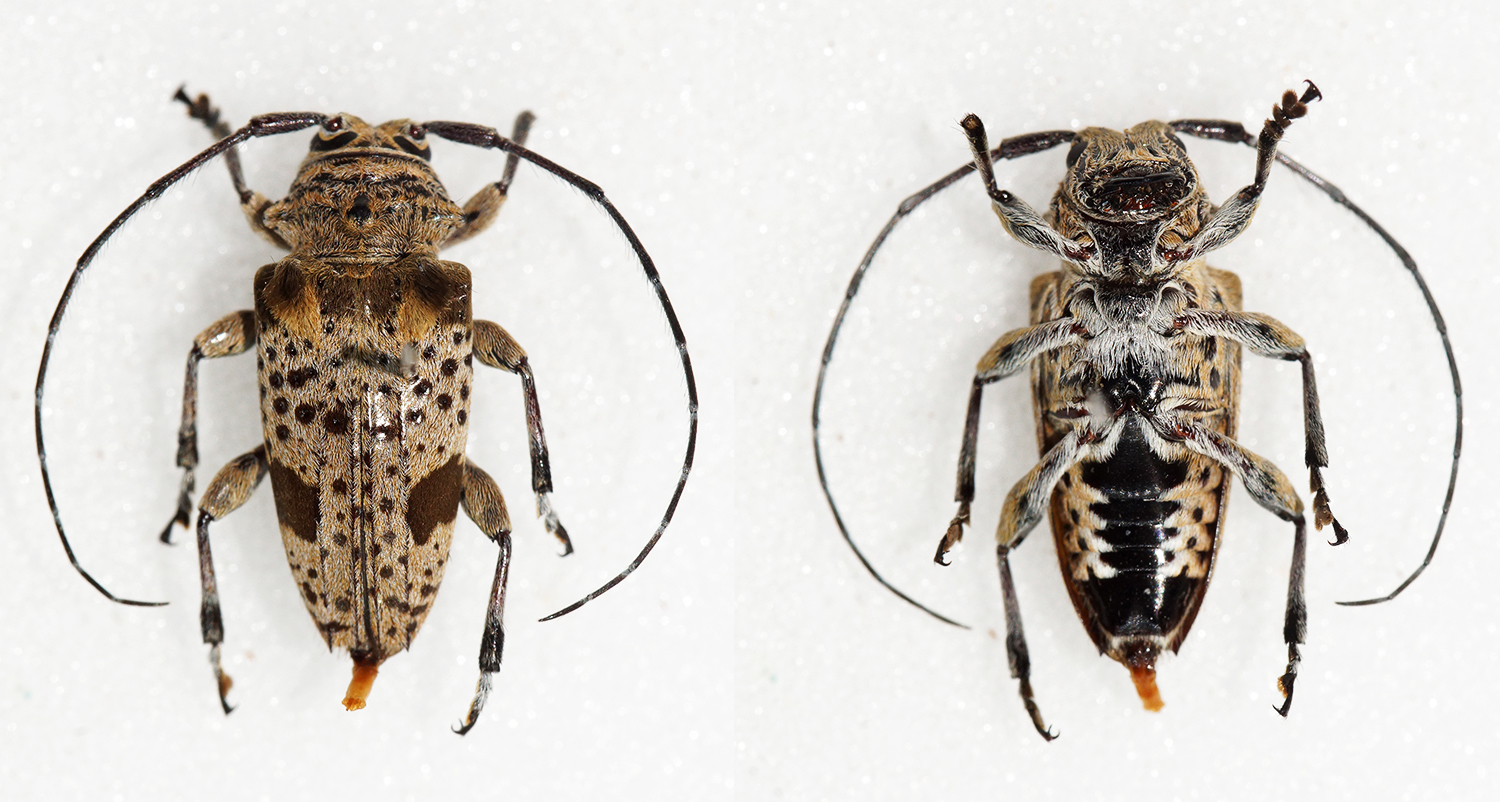

Scientific classification
- Domain: Eukaryota
- Kingdom: Animalia
- Phylum: Arthropoda
- Class: Insecta
- Order: Coleoptera
- Suborder: Polyphaga
- Infraorder: Cucujiformia
- Family: Cerambycidae
- Genus: Disterna
- Species: D. plumifera

Binomial name
- Disterna plumifera (Pascoe, 1859)

Synonyms
- Paradisterna plumifera (Pascoe, 1859); Zygocera plumifera Pascoe, 1859

= Disterna plumifera =

Species of beetle

Disterna plumifera is a species of beetle in the family Cerambycidae. It was described by Francis Polkinghorne Pascoe in 1859. It is known from Australia.
