= Demonassa capitalis =

Scientific classification
- Domain: Eukaryota
- Kingdom: Animalia
- Phylum: Arthropoda
- Class: Insecta
- Order: Coleoptera
- Suborder: Polyphaga
- Infraorder: Cucujiformia
- Family: Cerambycidae
- Genus: Demonassa
- Species: D. capitalis

Binomial name
- Demonassa capitalis Blackburn, 1908

Species of beetle

Demonassa capitalis is a species of beetle in the family Cerambycidae. It was described by Blackburn in 1908. It is known from Australia.
