= Disterna bifasciata =

Scientific classification
- Kingdom: Animalia
- Phylum: Arthropoda
- Class: Insecta
- Order: Coleoptera
- Suborder: Polyphaga
- Infraorder: Cucujiformia
- Family: Cerambycidae
- Genus: Disterna
- Species: D. bifasciata

Binomial name
- Disterna bifasciata (Pascoe, 1859)

Synonyms
- Zygocera bifasciata Pascoe, 1859

Species of beetle

Disterna bifasciata is a species of beetle in the family Cerambycidae. It was described by Francis Polkinghorne Pascoe in 1859. It is known from Australia.
