= Disterna maculata =

Scientific classification
- Domain: Eukaryota
- Kingdom: Animalia
- Phylum: Arthropoda
- Class: Insecta
- Order: Coleoptera
- Suborder: Polyphaga
- Infraorder: Cucujiformia
- Family: Cerambycidae
- Genus: Disterna
- Species: D. maculata

Binomial name
- Disterna maculata McKeown, 1938

Synonyms
- Zygocera maculata McKeown, 1938

Species of beetle

Disterna maculata is a species of beetle in the family Cerambycidae. It was described by Keith Collingwood McKeown in 1938. It is known from Australia.
