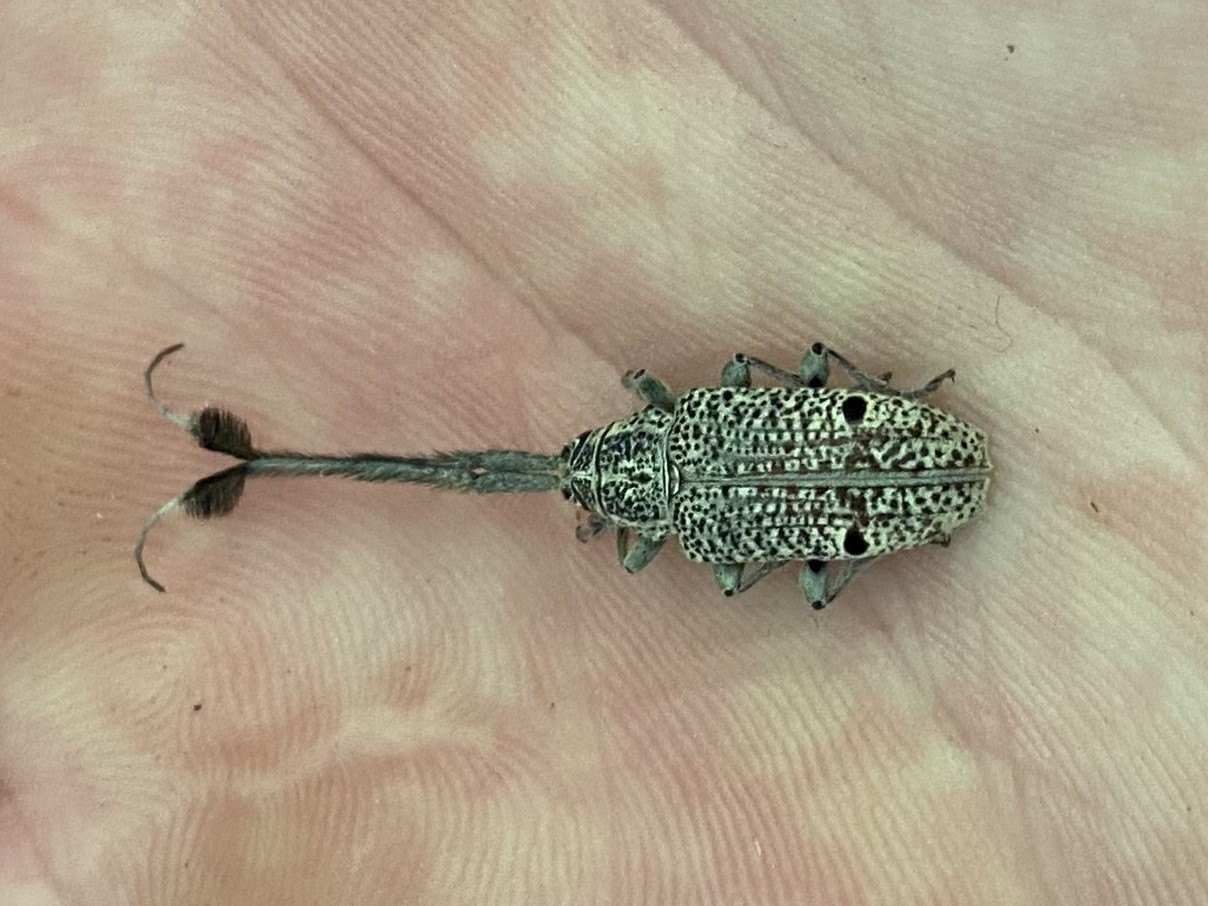

Scientific classification
- Kingdom: Animalia
- Phylum: Arthropoda
- Class: Insecta
- Order: Coleoptera
- Suborder: Polyphaga
- Infraorder: Cucujiformia
- Family: Cerambycidae
- Tribe: Zygocerini
- Genus: Thyada; Pascoe, 1863
- Species: T. barbicornis

Binomial name
- Thyada barbicornis (Pascoe, 1859)

Synonyms
- Zygocera barbicornis Pascoe, 1859

= Thyada =

Thyada barbicornis

Genus of longhorn beetles

Thyada is a genus of beetles in the family Cerambycidae. It is monotypic, being represented by the single species Thyada barbicornis.
