= Pseudozygocera =

Scientific classification
- Kingdom: Animalia
- Phylum: Arthropoda
- Class: Insecta
- Order: Coleoptera
- Suborder: Polyphaga
- Infraorder: Cucujiformia
- Family: Cerambycidae
- Genus: Pseudozygocera
- Species: P. albomaculata

Binomial name
- Pseudozygocera albomaculata Breuning, 1948

Genus of beetles

Pseudozygocera albomaculata is a species of beetle in the family Cerambycidae, and the only species in the genus Pseudozygocera. It was described by Stephan von Breuning in 1948.
