= Calezygocera =

Scientific classification
- Kingdom: Animalia
- Phylum: Arthropoda
- Class: Insecta
- Order: Coleoptera
- Suborder: Polyphaga
- Infraorder: Cucujiformia
- Family: Cerambycidae
- Genus: Calezygocera
- Species: C. baloghi

Binomial name
- Calezygocera baloghi (Breuning, 1978)

Genus of beetles

Calezygocera baloghi is a species of beetle in the family Cerambycidae, and the only species in the genus Calezygocera. It was described by Stephan von Breuning in 1978.
