= Scapozygoceropsis =

Scientific classification
- Kingdom: Animalia
- Phylum: Arthropoda
- Class: Insecta
- Order: Coleoptera
- Suborder: Polyphaga
- Infraorder: Cucujiformia
- Family: Cerambycidae
- Genus: Scapozygoceropsis
- Species: S. albertisi

Binomial name
- Scapozygoceropsis albertisi Breuning, 1973

Genus of beetles

Scapozygoceropsis albertisi is a species of beetle in the family Cerambycidae, and the only species in the genus Scapozygoceropsis. It was described by Stephan von Breuning in 1973.
