= National Register of Historic Places listings in Merced County, California =

Location of Merced County in California

This is a list of the National Register of Historic Places listings in Merced County, California.

This is intended to be a complete list of the properties and districts on the National Register of Historic Places in Merced County, California, United States. Latitude and longitude coordinates are provided for many National Register properties and districts; these locations may be seen together in an online map.

There are 16 properties and districts listed on the National Register in the county.

This National Park Service list is complete through NPS recent listings posted September 4, 2026.

== Current listings ==
	Name on the Register	Image	Date listed	Location	City or town	Description
1	Bank of Italy, Merced	Bank of Italy, Merced	October 12, 2004 (#04001135)	501 W. Main St. 37°18′06″N 120°28′58″W	Merced	
2	Bank of Los Banos Building	Bank of Los Banos Building	August 24, 1979 (#79000500)	836, 840, 842 and 848 6th St. 37°03′40″N 120°50′51″W	Los Banos	
3	Bloss Mansion	Bloss Mansion	September 3, 1981 (#81000162)	1020 Cedar Ave. 37°20′51″N 120°36′19″W	Atwater	
4	Buhach Grammar School	Buhach Grammar School	April 7, 1983 (#83001206)	2606 N. Buhach Rd. 37°19′27″N 120°34′39″W	Merced	
5	Church of St. Joseph	Church of St. Joseph	July 8, 2004 (#04000330)	1105 5th St. 37°03′35″N 120°51′04″W	Los Banos	
6	Maj. George Beecher Cook House	Maj. George Beecher Cook House	September 15, 1983 (#83001207)	356 W. 21st St. 37°18′17″N 120°28′42″W	Merced	
7	Kaehler-Rector House	Kaehler-Rector House	January 4, 1982 (#82002206)	408 W. 25th St. 37°18′31″N 120°28′36″W	Merced	
8	Leggett House	Leggett House	October 25, 1979 (#79000501)	352 W. 22nd St; 37°18′19″N 120°28′40″W	Merced	
9	Thomas H. Leggett House	Thomas H. Leggett House	July 8, 1982 (#82002207)	346 W. 21st St. 37°18′16″N 120°28′42″W	Merced	
10	Merced County Courthouse	Merced County Courthouse	October 29, 1975 (#75000441)	W. 21st and N Sts. 37°18′22″N 120°29′00″W	Merced	
11	Merced County High School	Merced County High School	May 31, 1984 (#84000909)	2125 M St. 37°18′24″N 120°28′54″W	Merced	
12	Merced Theatre	Merced Theatre	May 1, 2009 (#09000248)	301 W. 17th St. 37°18′03″N 120°28′50″W	Merced	
13	San Luis Gonzaga Archeological District		May 7, 1973 (#73000412)	Address Restricted	Los Banos	
14	Strand Theater		December 7, 2021 (#100007227)	655-661 West Main St. 37°18′09″N 120°29′09″W	Merced	
15	Tioga Hotel	Tioga Hotel	October 3, 1980 (#80000821)	1715 N St. 37°18′08″N 120°29′08″W	Merced	
16	U.S. Post Office	U.S. Post Office	February 10, 1983 (#83001208)	401 W. 18th St. 37°18′08″N 120°28′50″W	Merced	

== See also ==
- List of National Historic Landmarks in California
- National Register of Historic Places listings in California
- California Historical Landmarks in Merced County, California
