= List of museums in the San Joaquin Valley =

The San Joaquin Valley (/ˌsæn hwɑːˈkiːn/ SAN whah-KEEN) is the area of the Central Valley of California that lies south of the Sacramento–San Joaquin River Delta in Stockton.

This is a list of museums, defined for this context as institutions (including nonprofit organizations, government entities, and private businesses) that collect and care for objects of cultural, artistic, scientific, or historical interest and make their collections or related exhibits available for public viewing. Also included are non-profit and university art galleries. Museums that exist only in cyberspace (i.e., virtual museums) are not included.

To use the sortable tables: click on the icons at the top of each column to sort that column in alphabetical order; click again for reverse alphabetical order.

== Museums ==
Name	Image	Town/City	County	Type	Summary
African-American Historical and Cultural Museum of the San Joaquin Valley		Fresno	Fresno	African American	website
Air Force Flight Test Center Museum		Edwards Air Force Base	Kern	Aviation	websiteHistoric military aircraft and testing at the Base, located at the North Entrance, also a facility in Palmdale
Arte Américas		Fresno	Fresno	Art	website, cultural arts center with exhibit galleries focusing on Mexico, Latin America, the Southwest and California
Bakersfield Museum of Art		Bakersfield	Kern	Art	websiteCollection focus is regional art
Billy Creek Museum		Huntington Lake	Fresno	Local history	website, operated by the Huntington Lake Big Creek Historical Conservancy, located in the Sierra National Forest on Huntington Lake
Borax Visitor Center		Boron	Kern	Mining	website Borax mining and processing, geology, views of the open pit mine
Bloss House Museum		Atwater	Merced	Historic house	website Operated by the Atwater Historical Society, restored early 20th-century mansion
Buck Owens Crystal Palace		Bakersfield	Kern	Biographical	website/ Country western music hall with museum about musician Buck Owens
Buena Vista Museum of Natural History		Bakersfield	Kern	Natural history	website Exhibits include anatomy, astronomy, anthropology, archeology, biology, geology and paleontology
California Foundry History Museum – Lodi		Lodi	San Joaquin	Industry	website, Lodi Iron Works and area foundries
Castle Air Museum		Atwater	Merced	Aviation	website Vintage aircraft
Central Sierra Museum		Shaver Lake	Fresno	Local history	website, operated by the Central Sierra Historical Society
Cesar E. Chavez National Monument		Keene	Kern	Biographical	website Life and work of Cesar Chavez and the farm worker movement
Children's Museum of Stockton		Stockton	San Joaquin	Children's	website
Clovis Museum		Clovis	Fresno	Local history	website, operated by the Clovis-Big Dry Creek Historical Society
Coarsegold Historic Museum		Coarsegold	Madera	Open air	website, complex includes an adobe freight way-station, one-room school and the barn with museum displays of local history
Colonel Allensworth State Historic Park		Allensworth	Tulare	African American	website Historic farming town founded, financed, and governed by African Americans, with nine restored buildings
Community Heritage Center		Clovis	Fresno	Local & military history	website/ An educational experience showcasing Clovis history with a focus on recognizing the region's and nation's veteran community. Operated by the Clovis Veterans Memorial District.
Dinuba Southern Pacific Depot Museum		Dinuba	Tulare	Local history	website, operated by the Alta District Historical Society
Discovery Center		Fresno	Fresno	Science	website, educational science center and natural history exhibits
Eagle Field AAF		Firebaugh	Fresno	Military	History of the World War II army airfield, also known as the Central California Historical Military Museum
Eastern Fresno County Historical Museum		Auberry	Fresno	Local history	website, operated by the Eastern Fresno County Historical Society
Escalon Historical Museum		Escalon	San Joaquin	Local history	website, operated by the Escalon Historical Society
Exeter Historical Museum		Exeter	Tulare	Local history	website
Fossil Discovery Center of Madera County		Chowchilla	Madera	Natural history	website, prehistoric life in the San Joaquin Valley during the last Ice Age, fossils, rocks and minerals, area Native American artifacts
Forestiere Underground Gardens		Fresno	Fresno	Historic house	website/ Hand-built network of underground rooms, courtyards and passageways with fruit-bearing plants
Fort Tejon Historic Park		Grapevine	Kern	Military	website Restored mid-19th-century U.S. Army fort with living history programs on Saturdays
Fresno Art Museum		Fresno	Fresno	Art	website, permanent collection includes over 3,600 modern and contemporary works by nationally and internationally known artists (painting, sculpture, prints, photographs, and other media) and a premiere Pre-Columbian and Mesoamerican collection. Institution includes rotating exhibitions, sculpture garden, a permanent Pre-Columbian installation, and a Museum store. Accredited by the American Alliance of Museums since 1973. Founded in 1949.
Fresno Flats Historic Village and Park		Oakhurst	Madera	Open air	website, complex includes two restored homes, two one-room schools, two 19th Century jails and several farm buildings
Giant Forest Museum			Tulare	Natural history	website, ecology of sequoias, the Giant Forest and human history of Sequoia National Park
Great Valley Museum of Natural History		Modesto	Stanislaus	Natural history	website, part of Modesto Junior College
Gustine Museum		Gustine	Merced	Local history	website, housed in a former courthouse and jail, operated by the Gustine Historical Society
Haggin Museum		Stockton	San Joaquin	Multiple	website Art and history, collection includes late 19th-century American and European paintings, local and regional historical artifacts
Hanford Carnegie Museum		Hanford	Kings	Local history	website/
Hill House Museum		Lodi	San Joaquin	Historic house	website, operated by the Lodi Historical Society, Victorian mansion
ImagineU Children's Museum		Visalia	Tulare	Children's	website
International Agri-Center		Tulare	Tulare	Agriculture	website, dairy farming, agriculture, includes the Antique Farm Equipment Museum with restored antique tractors, farm implements and equipment, steam engines, history of farming and ranching
Kearney Mansion Museum		Fresno	Fresno	Historic house	website, located in Kearney Park, operated by the Fresno Historical Society
Kern County Museum		Bakersfield	Kern	Open air	website/ Over 50 historic buildings, includes Bakersfield Country Music Museum
Kern Valley Museum		Kernville	Kern	Local history	website, operated by the Kern Valley Historical Society, includes rocks and fossils, mining and ranching artifacts, Edison hydroelectric plants, movie-making history of the area and construction of the Isabella Dam
Madera County Museum		Madera	Madera	Local history	Facebook page/ Located in the former county courthouse, operated by the Madera County Historical Society
Manteca Historical Museum		Manteca	San Joaquin	Local history	website, operated by the Manteca Historical Society
McHenry Mansion		Modesto	Stanislaus	Historic house	website Victorian Italianate mansion
McHenry Museum		Modesto	Stanislaus	Local history	website, includes County recorders office, a general store, recreated blacksmith shop, gold mining paraphernalia, fire fighting equipment, household furnishings
Maturango Museum		Ridgecrest	Kern	Local history	website/ Cultural history, natural history, and geology of the Northern Mojave Desert
Merced Agricultural Museum		Merced	Merced	Agriculture	information, antique farming equipment, gas engines and household appliances
Merced County Courthouse Museum		Merced	Merced	Local history	website Located in the county's three-story courthouse built in 1875
Meux Home Museum		Fresno	Fresno	Historic house	website, Victorian mansion
Milliken Museum		Los Banos	Merced	Local history	Facebook site, operated by the Milliken Museum Society of Los Banos California, photos
Minter Field Air Museum		Shafter	Kern	Aviation	website, history of Minter Army Airfield in World War II
Naval Museum of Armament & Technology		Ridgecrest	Kern	Military	website Also known as China Lake Museum, naval air armaments, and technology
Newman Museum		Newman	Stanislaus	Local history	website, operated by the Newman Historical Society in a former Carnegie Library building
Nuui Cunni Native American Intertribal Cultural Center		Lake Isabella	Kern	Native American	website
Oakdale Cowboy Museum		Oakdale	Stanislaus	History	website, saddles, branding irons, boots, spurs and chaps, ranching, rodeo cowboys and cowgirls
Oakdale Museum and History Center		Oakdale	Stanislaus	Local history	website, operated by the Friends of Oakdale Heritage in the mid 19th-century Sydnor-Prowse House
Patterson Township Historical Society Museum		Patterson	Stanislaus	Local history	website
Porterville Historical Museum		Porterville	Tulare	Local history	website
Rand Desert Museum		Randsburg	Kern	Local history	website, area history, mining
Raymond Museum		Raymond	Madera	Local history	website, also known as Charles Miller House
Reedley Museum		Reedley	Fresno	Local history	website, operated by the Reedley Historical Society, Facebook site
Ridge Route Communities Museum and Historical Society		Frazier Park	Kern	Local history	website, operated by the Ridge Route Communities Historical Society
Riverbank Historical Museum		Riverbank	Stanislaus	Local history	Facebook page, operated by the Riverbank Historical Society
Sanger Depot Museum		Sanger	Fresno	Local history	website
San Joaquin County Historical Society and Museum		Lodi	San Joaquin	Open air	website/ Exhibits about San Joaquin County agriculture and history, including farm equipment, period furnishings, tools, ranching equipment, early transportation, harness and blacksmith shops, one-room school, Native American exhibit
Saxon Aerospace Museum		Boron	Kern	Aviation	website
Shafter Depot Museum		Shafter	Kern	Local history	website, railroad, agriculture, and local history exhibits
Sierra Mono Museum		North Fork	Madera	Native American	website, Mono tribe baskets, artifacts and culture, nature dioramas and over 100 taxidermy animals from Northern America, Asia, and South America
Silver City Ghost Town		Bodfish	Kern	Open air	website, historic mining town structures including a saloon and country store, period miner's cabins, post office and general store, church
Springville Museum		Springville	Tulare	Local history	Facebook site, operated by the Tule River Historical Society
Stockton Field Aviation Museum		Stockton	San Joaquin	Aviation	website, Facebook Site, museum in progress, history of Stockton Field in WWII, WWII aircraft and artifacts
Taoist Temple & Museum		Hanford	Kings	Culture	Part of historic China Alley, temple and museum of Hanford's Chinese history
Tehachapi Depot Railroad Museum		Tehachapi	Kern	Railroad	website Rebuilt depot with railroad artifacts
Tehachapi Heritage Museum		Tehachapi	Kern	Local history	website, includes the Errea House
Thornberry Museum		Fish Camp	Madera	Local history	website/ Displays of actual tools used nearly a century ago and exhibits describing how life was for the first European inhabitants of the region.
Three Rivers Historical Museum		Three Rivers	Tulare	Local history	website, Historical Museum located at entrance to Sequoia National Park
Tracy Historical Museum		Tracy	San Joaquin	Local history	website, operated by the West Side Pioneer Association
Tulare County Museum		Visalia	Tulare	Local history	website, operated by the Tulare County Historical Society in Mooney Grove Park, includes Native American baskets, pioneer artifacts, agriculture equipment, restored buildings
Tulare Historical Museum		Tulare	Tulare	Local history	website
Twenty Mule Team Museum		Boron	Kern	Local history	website/ Local history and history of borax mining in Death Valley and Boron
UC Merced Art Gallery		Merced	Merced	Art	Facebook page
Veterans Memorial Museum		Fresno	Fresno	Military	website/ Uniforms, medals, weapons, photos, models, Legion of Valor honorees
Wasco Historical Museum		Wasco	Kern	Local history	Facebook page
Wassama Round House State Historic Park		Oakhurst	Madera	Native American	website Site used by local Native Americans as a ceremonial meeting place
West Kern Oil Museum		Taft	Kern	Local history	website/
William Saroyan House Museum		Fresno	Fresno	Historic house	website, Pulitzer Prize, Oscar-winning, writer WILLIAM SAROYAN HOUSE MUSEUM
Zalud House		Porterville	Tulare	Historic house	website Victorian period house
Modesto Children's Museum		Modesto	Stanislaus	Children's Museum	www.modestochildrensmuseum.org

== Defunct museums ==
- Castle Science and Technology Center, Atwater, closed in 2012
- Clark Center for Japanese Art and Culture, Hanford, website, closed in 2015, collections moved to the Minneapolis Institute of Arts and the bonsai collection to the Shinzen Friendship Garden in Woodward Park, Fresno
- Fresno Metropolitan Museum of Art and Science, Fresno, closed in 2010

== See also ==
- National Register of Historic Places listings in Fresno County, California
- National Register of Historic Places listings in Kern County, California
- National Register of Historic Places listings in Kings County, California
- National Register of Historic Places listings in Madera County, California
- National Register of Historic Places listings in Merced County, California
- National Register of Historic Places listings in San Joaquin County, California
- National Register of Historic Places listings in Stanislaus County, California
- National Register of Historic Places listings in Tulare County, California
