= Leggett House =

Leggett House may refer to:

- Leggett House (Little Red, Arkansas), listed on the NRHP in White County, Arkansas
- Leggett House (Merced, California), listed on the NRHP in California
- Thomas H. Leggett House, Merced, California, listed on the NRHP in Merced County, California
- Andrews-Leggett House, Commerce, Michigan, listed on the NRHP in Oakland County, Michigan
