= Buhach =

Buhach may refer to:

- Buhach, California
- Buhach Colony High School
- Buhach Grammar School on the National Register of Historic Places
