= Anthony Heinsbergen =

American painter (1894–1981)

- Born: Antoon Heinsbergen; December 13, 1894; Netherlands
- Died: June 14, 1981 (aged 86); Los Angeles County, California, U.S.
- Education: Chouinard Art Institute
- Known for: Interior design of movie palaces
- Spouse: Nedith K. Mclean
- Children: 2

Anthony Heinsbergen (December 13, 1894 – June 14, 1981), born Antoon Heinsbergen, was a prolific designer of building interiors, particularly movie theaters, and was also one of the top muralists in the United States.

== Biography ==
=== Early life ===
Anthony Heinsbergen was born on December 13, 1894 in the Netherlands. At age 10, he worked as an apprentice to a restoration painter, his talent enough that he was paid half the amount an apprentice typically had to pay to apprentice.

Heinsbergen emigrated with his father to the United States in 1906. They settled in Los Angeles, where he continued as an apprentice at the Parker Decorating Company. Heinsbergen was also one of the first students to take formal training from Nelbert Chouinard at her Chouinard Art Institute.

=== Career ===
At Parker Decorating Company, Heinsbergen was promoted to foreman by age 15 and principal foreman by 18.

Heinsbergen's earliest commissions were numerous murals around Los Angeles. These murals brought him to the attention of Alexander Pantages, who in 1920 or 1924 commissioned him to design and paint the interiors of 22 of his theaters. Additionally, in 1925 Heinsbergen secured work on the Los Angeles Elks Lodge by significantly underbidding in order to obtain a high-profile commission. These works earned him considerable recognition, and following them, he did not have to solicit work for 38 years.

In 1922, Heinsbergen founded the Heinsbergen Decorating Company, which at its peak employed more than 180 decorative painters. Heinsbergen and his employees completed approximately 750 projects across North America, including 12 theaters for United Artists, 38 for the Pantages circuit, and 20 branches for California Bank. His company also worked on civic buildings, hotels, private homes, cathedrals, synagogues, and more, but it was best known for its theaters. He often worked with architects Curlett and Beelman, who in return designed Heinsbergen's offices and studio in 1928.

Heinsbergen transitioned to interior restorations toward the end of his career and was still working on high profile commissions at the age of 82. After his death, his son took over management of his company.

=== Personal life and death ===
Heinsbergen married Nedith K. Mclean, who herself was born on May 22, 1900 in Canada. They had two children together, a son named Anthony and daughter named Nedith. They also employed a servant in their home.

Heinsbergen designed his own home on the south slope of the Santa Monica Mountains in Pacific Palisades. He was also a prolific painter, which he did mostly outdoors and for relaxation.

Heinsbergen died in Los Angeles County on June 14, 1981.

== Style and subjects ==
Heinsbergen movie theater interiors were rooted in Art Deco and Spanish Renaissance Revival styles. He was also credited as the creator of Egyptian temple, Renaissance palace, and Cubist-Gothic fantasy movie theater design.

Heinsbergen described his personal paintings as having an "impressionistic realism" style.

=== Controversy ===
While Heinsbergen's works were usually admired by the press and public, a few of his works created controversy. His 1937 mural in the bar of Senator Hotel, which depicted the romance of former king Edward VIII and Wallis Simpson, created debate on the subject of art versus bad taste. Fearing similar outcry, a few years later his mural of six female figures in Tower Theater was repainted to make the woman appear more modest.

== List of works ==
Notable buildings either containing murals or with interiors designed by Heinsbergen or his employees include:

=== Theaters ===
==== Los Angeles ====
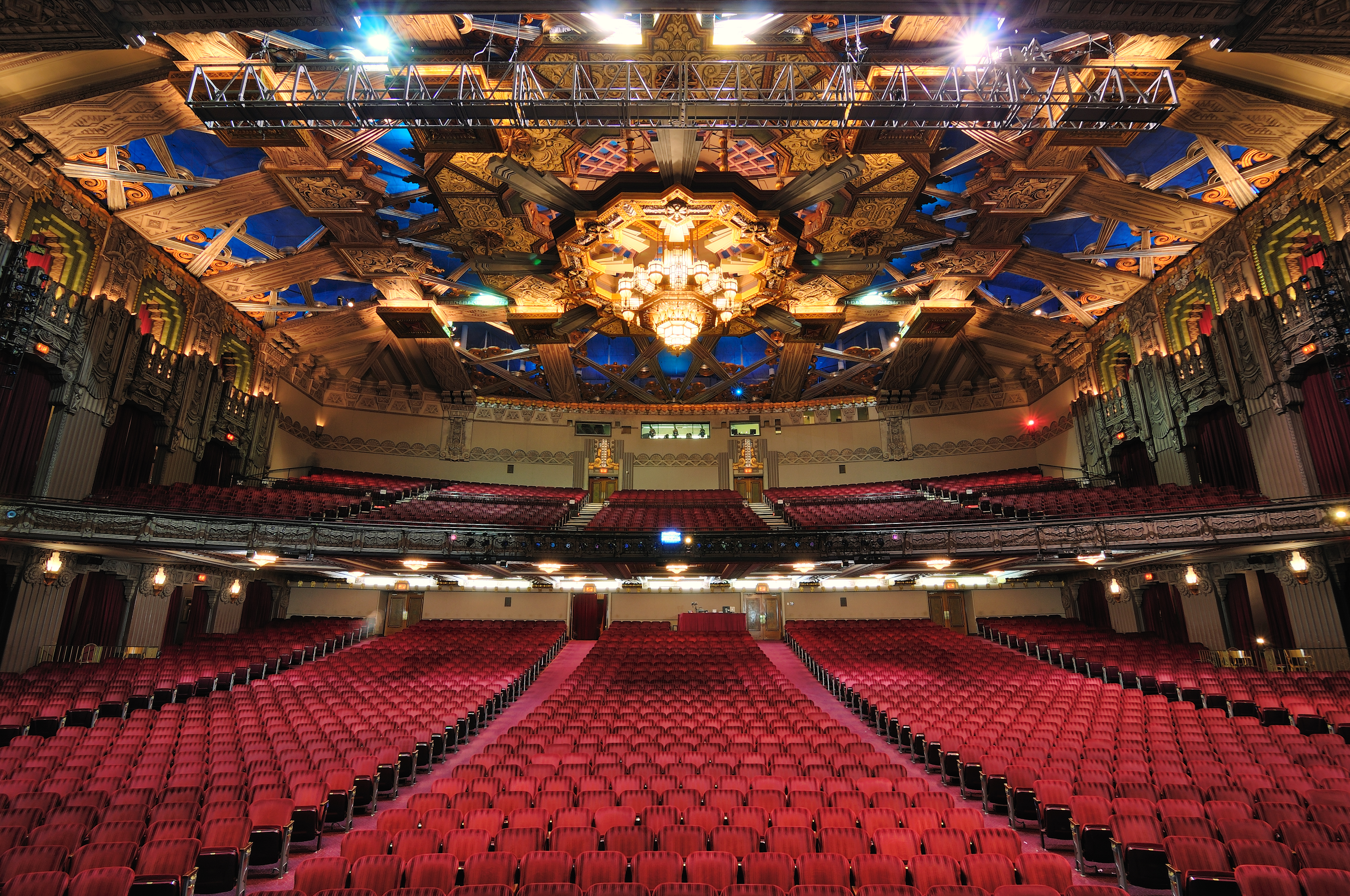
Hollywood Pantages

- Westlake, 1926
- United Artists, 1927
- Tower, 1927
- Warner Grand, 1930
- Hollywood Pantages, 1930
- Wiltern, 1931
- Leimert, 1931
- El Portal, 1930s remodel
- Palace, 1930s remodel

==== Elsewhere in California ====
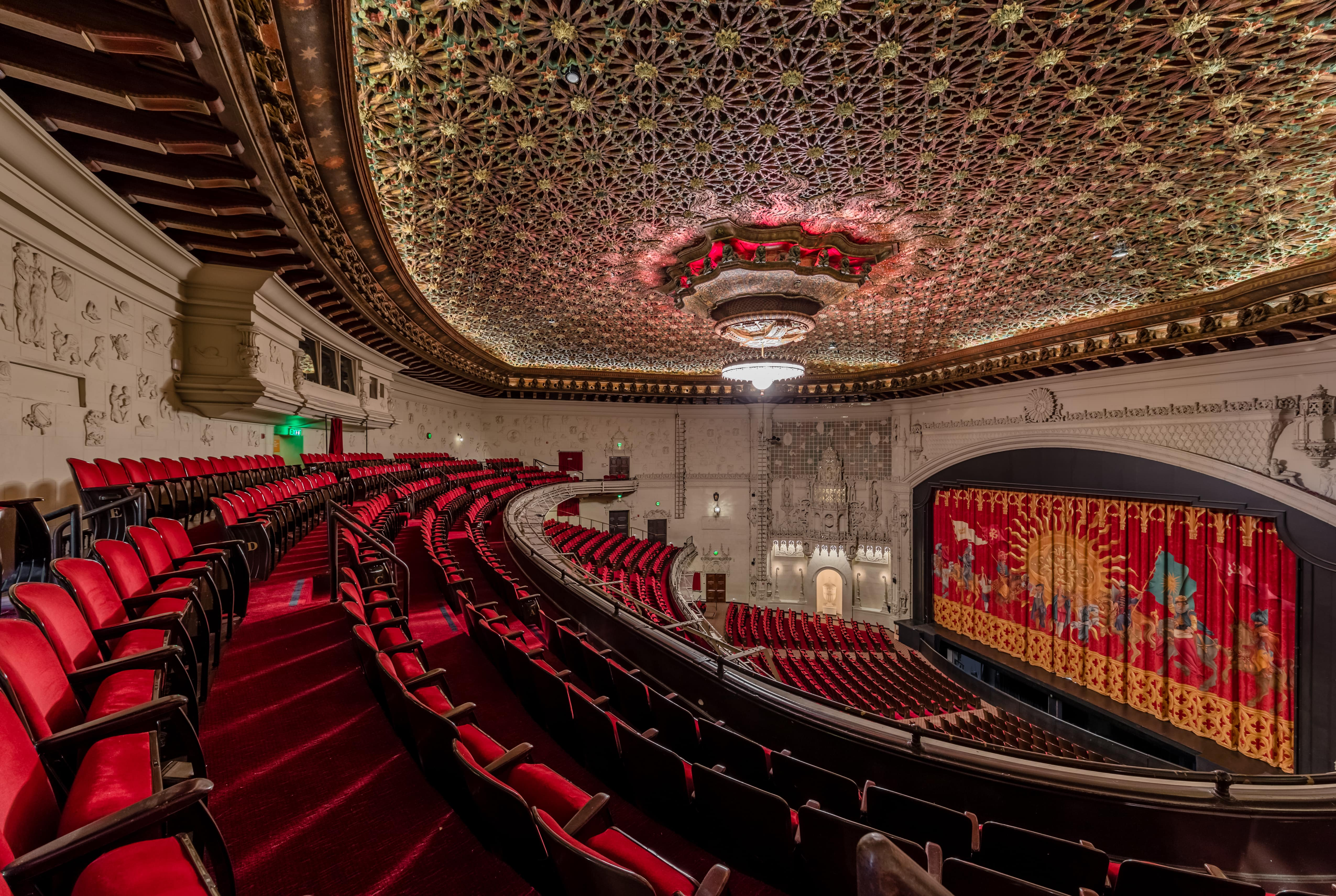
Orpheum, San Francisco

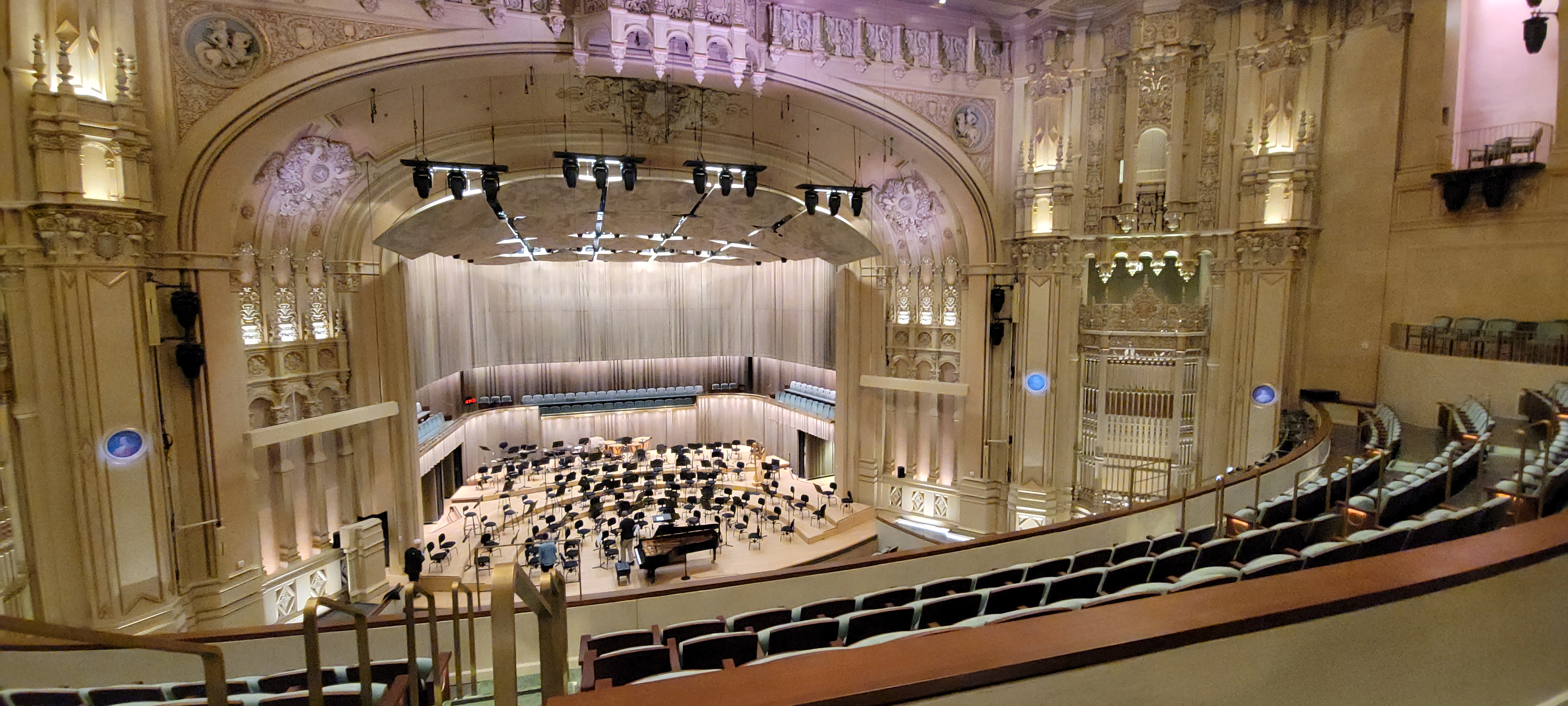
Fox San Diego

- Metro, San Francisco, 1924
- Fox, Fullerton, 1925
- Stanford, Palo Alto, 1925
- Orpheum, San Francisco, 1926
- Golden Gate, East Los Angeles, 1927
- Fox, San Diego, 1929
- Warner Huntington Park, 1931
- Warner Beverly Hills, 1931
- Merced, Merced, 1931
- Paramount, Oakland, 1931
- Fresno Memorial, Fresno, 1936
- Tower, Fresno, 1939
- Lorenzo, San Lorenzo, 1940s

==== Washington ====
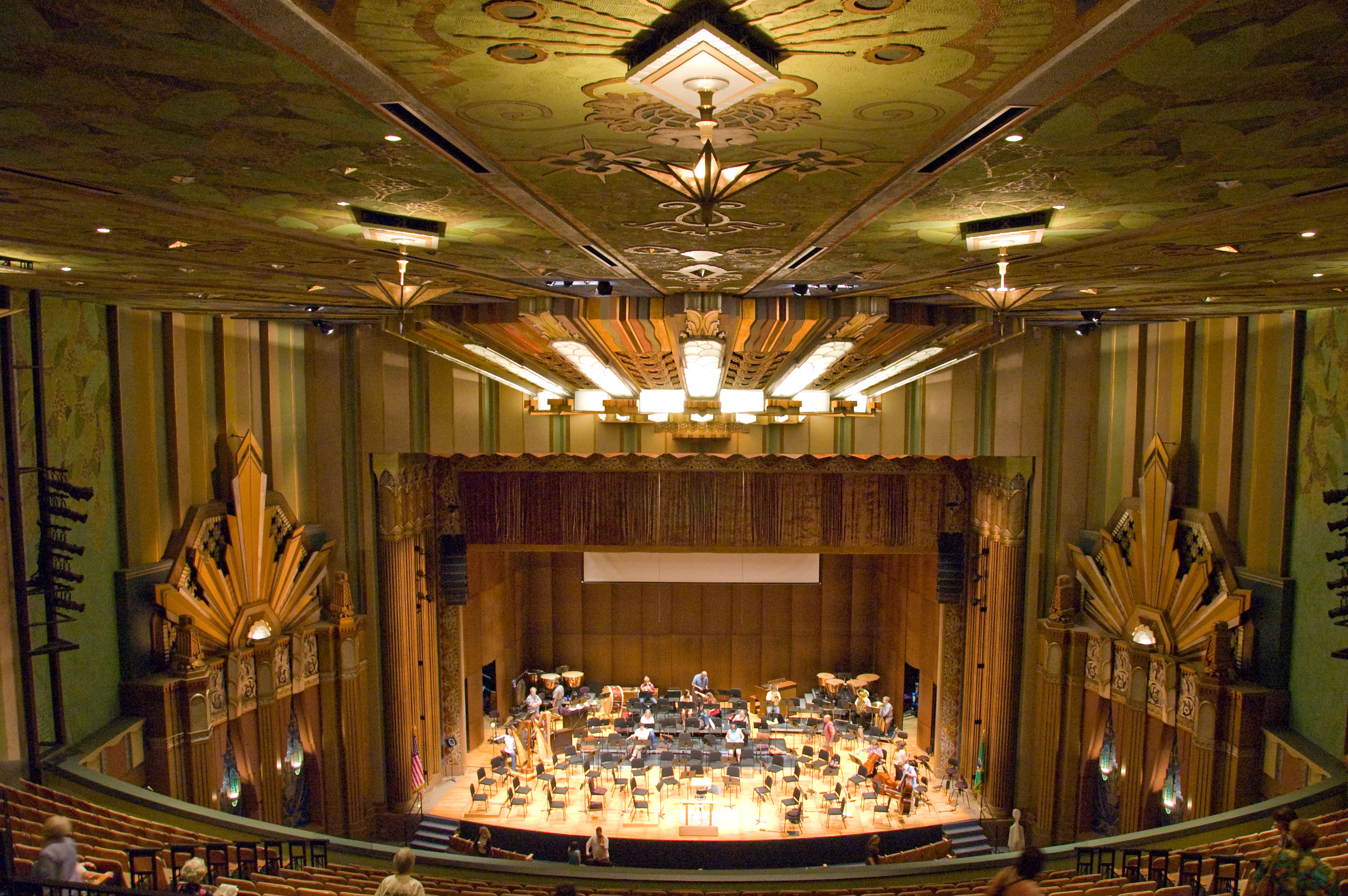
Fox Spokane

- Capitol, Yakima, 1920
- Fox, Spokane, 1931
- Admiral, Seattle, 1942
- Magnolia, Seattle, 1948
- Lewis and Clark Theater and Bowl, Tukwila, 1956

==== Elsewhere ====
- Orpheum, Vancouver, Canada, 1927
- Fourth Avenue, Anchorage, Alaska, 1947

=== Hotels ===
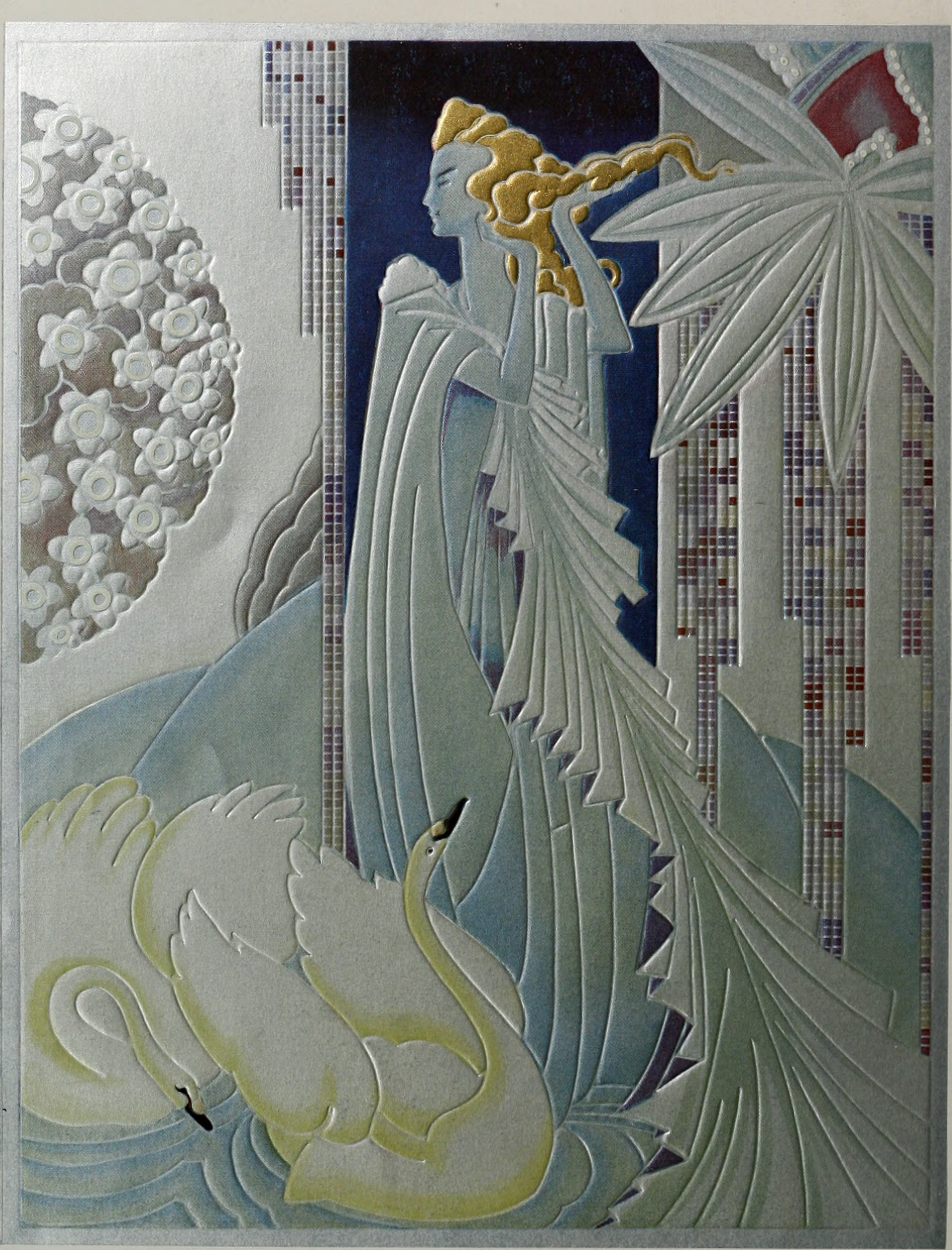
Decorative panel in Plaza Hotel's cocktail room

- The Biltmore Los Angeles, 1923
- Senator, Sacramento, 1924
- Hollywood Roosevelt, Los Angeles, 1927
- Beverly Wilshire, Beverly Hills, 1928
- Sir Francis Drake, San Francisco, 1928
- Tioga, Merced, 1928
- Agua Caliente Casino and Hotel, Tijuana, Mexico, 1928
- Plaza, San Francisco

=== Other buildings ===
==== Los Angeles ====
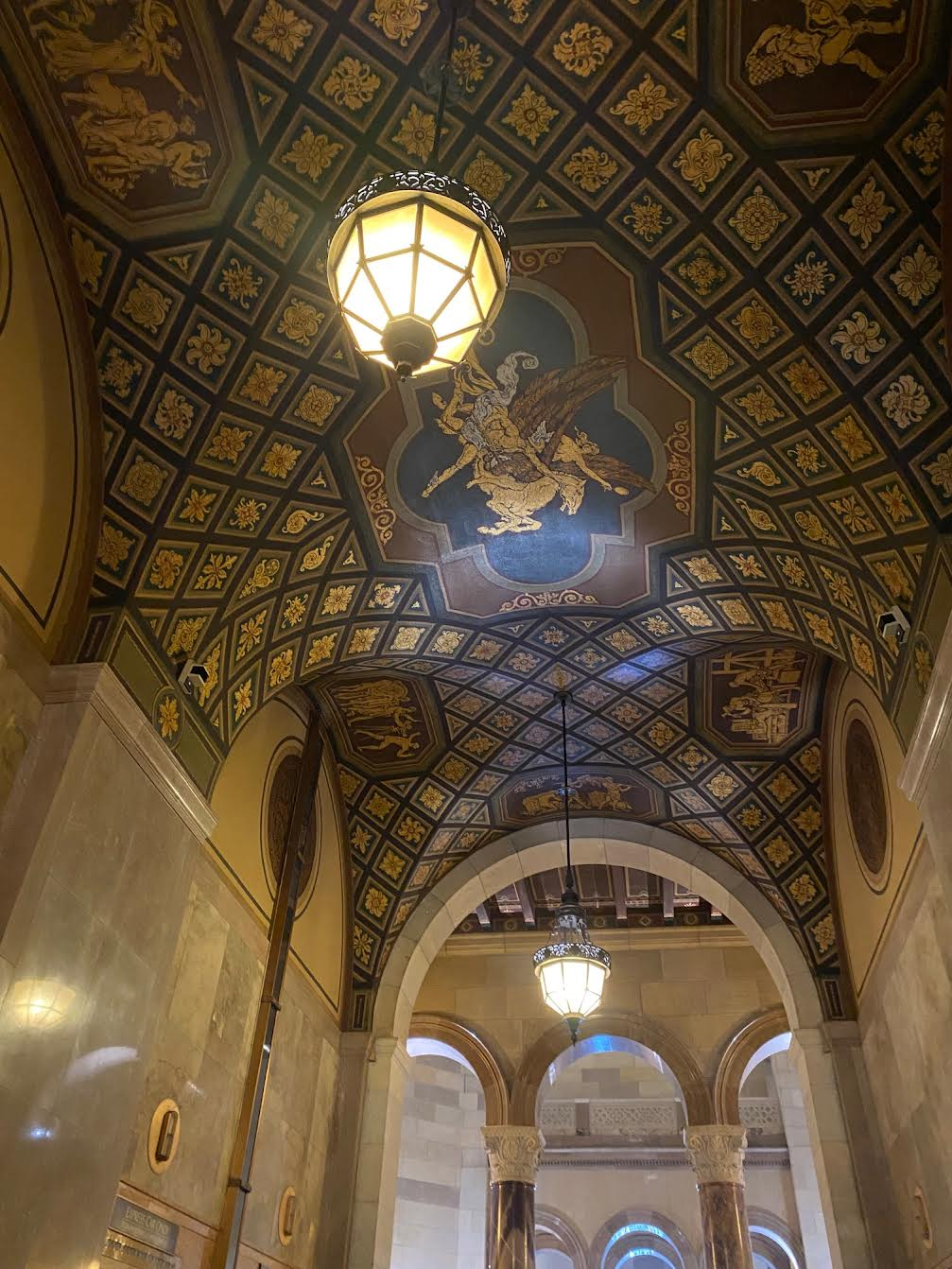
Ceiling in Los Angeles City Hall

- Petitfils-Boos House, 1922
- Elks Club, 1926
- Heinsbergen Decorating Company Building, 1927
- Fine Arts Building, 1927
- Los Angeles City Hall, 1928
- It Cafe in the Hollywood Plaza Hotel, 1937
- Bell Communications Around the Globe on the AT&T Switching Center, 1961

==== Elsewhere in California ====
- Pacific Southwest Building, Fresno, 1925
- Pacific Coast Club, Long Beach, 1926
- Elks and Olympic Club, San Francisco, 1927
- Lake Norconian Club, Norco, 1928
- Gables Club, Santa Monica, 1920s
- Beverly Hills City Hall, Beverly Hills, 1932
- Fresno City College Library, Fresno, 1933
- California State Capitol Library, Sacramento

==== Elsewhere ====
- Valley National Bank Building, Tucson, Arizona, 1929
- Herbert C. Hoover Building, Washington DC, 1932
