= Merced Theatre =

Merced Theatre may refer to:

- Merced Theatre (Los Angeles, California)
- Merced Theatre (Merced, California)
