= Bell Communications Around the Globe =

1961 artwork in Los Angeles, California, U.S.

- The artwork in 2022
- Artist: Anthony Heinsbergen
- Year: 1961
- Location: Los Angeles, California, U.S.
- 34.0509°N 118.2531°W

Bell Communications Around the Globe is a 1961 sculptural relief by Anthony Heinsbergen, installed on the west side of an AT&T switching center at 420 South Grand Avenue in Los Angeles, California. According to the Los Angeles Times, the mural depicts the "globe linked by undersea telephone cables and satellite relays that ricochet off a fey male nude". The map shows North and South America, Europe, Africa, and Australia.

== See also ==
- 1961 in art
