= Metro Theatre (San Francisco) =

Historic building in California, US

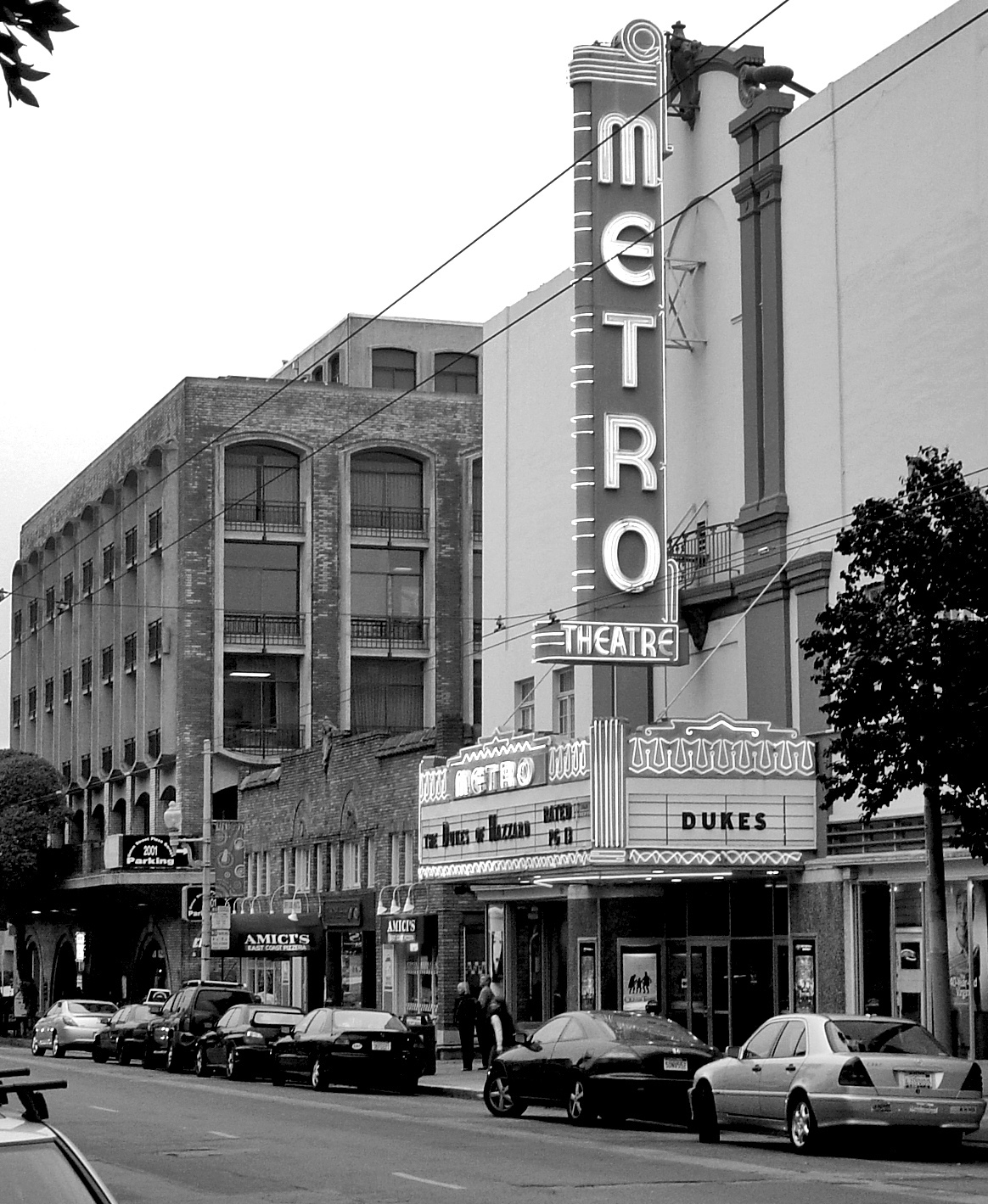
- Metro Theatre in 2005

- Location within San Francisco County
- 37.797304°N 122.433134°W
- Location: 2055 Union Street, San Francisco, California, U.S.

History
- Built: 1924; 102 years ago
- Built for: Samuel H. Levin

Site notes
- Architect: Reid Brothers
- Architectural styles: Spanish colonial revival, Art Deco

San Francisco Designated Landmark
- Designated: July 21, 2009
- Reference no.: 261

The Metro Theatre is a historic 1924 building and former single screen theatre in the Cow Hollow neighborhood of San Francisco, California, U.S.. The building was listed by the city as a San Francisco Designated Landmark in June 21, 2009; and has a historic marker. It is also known as the Metro Theater, and the Metropolitan Theater. The building is now used as a private gym.

== History ==
The Metropolitan Theatre was designed in the Spanish colonial revival style by the Reid Brothers (James Reid and Merritt Reid). It opened on April 23, 1924 as a second run theater, by Samuel H. Levin of San Francisco Theatres Inc., who also owned the Alexandria and Coliseum theaters in San Francisco. The first film shown was The Fighting Coward (1924), a silent film directed by James Cruze.

In 1941, the building was remodeled in an Art Deco style by Otto A. Deichmann and Timothy L. Pflueger. After the remodel, the name was shortened to "Metro Theatre". In the 1950s the reputation of the theatre increased after being the venue for the first San Francisco International Film Festival on December 4–18, 1957. Films screened at the first festival included The Captain from Köpenick (1956).

In March 1992, during the release of the erotic thriller film Basic Instinct (1992), women's groups such as the National Organization of Women (NOW) and queer groups in San Francisco and Los Angeles protested the depiction of women and queer violence outside. The Metro Theatre in San Francisco saw one of the largest protests on opening night, with some 100 protestors. In 1998, the building was renovated to bring the theatre back to its 1941 Art Deco style.

It was part of the Regal Entertainment Group before its closure in 2006. In 2009, a property developer committed to preserving the interior murals by Anthony Heinsbergen, ioinic columns, grilles and urns; and the building was converted into a private gym.

== See also ==
- List of San Francisco Designated Landmarks
