= Capitol Theatre (Yakima, Washington) =

Performing arts venue in Yakima, Washington, US

- Mercy Theatre
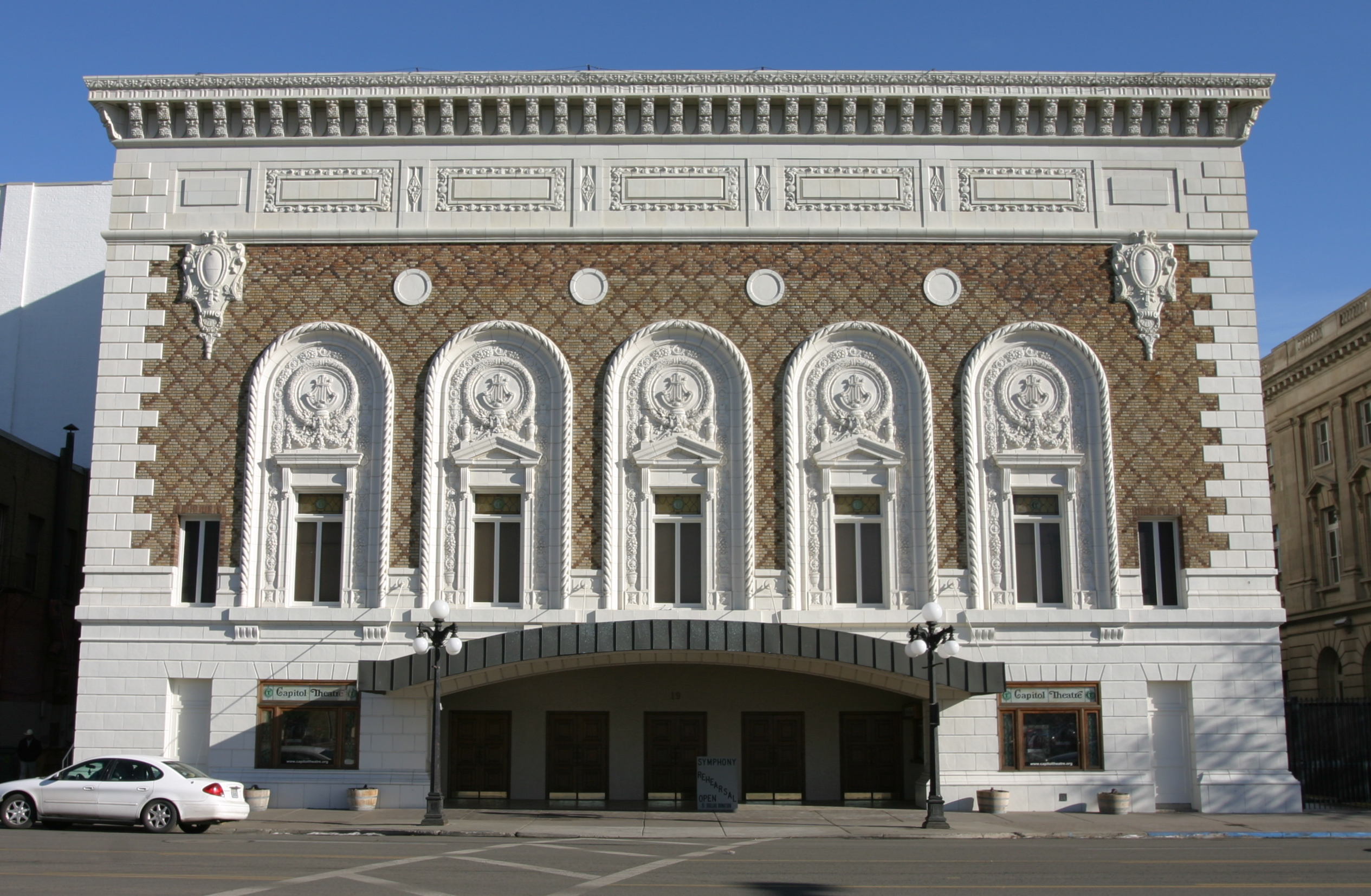
- The exterior of the Capitol Theatre
- Interactive map of Capitol Theatre
- Address: 19 S. 3rd St. Yakima, Washington; United States
- Owner: City of Yakima
- Operator: Capitol Theatre Committee
- Capacity: 1,500
- Current use: Performing Arts Center

Construction
- Opened: 1920
- Reopened: 1978
- Rebuilt: 1975

Website
- www.capitoltheatre.org
- Capitol Theatre
- U.S. National Register of Historic Places
- Location within Washington (state)
- Coordinates: 46°36′8.58″N 120°30′8.5″W
- Architect: B. Marcus Priteca
- Architectural style: Renaissance
- NRHP reference No.: 73001895
- Added to NRHP: April 11, 1973

The Capitol Theatre is a performing arts venue in Yakima, Washington. With its location in downtown Yakima and 1,500 seating capacity, it serves as the primary performing arts facility for the Yakima region.

== History ==
The Theatre was designed by B. Marcus Priteca and opened on April 5, 1920 as the Mercy Theatre, named after its owner, Frederick Mercy Sr (1877-1948), who earned his wealth in the theater business. At the time of its construction, the Mercy Theatre was the largest theatre in the Pacific Northwest. The theatre originally featured vaudeville acts and is currently home to the Yakima Symphony Orchestra, Town Hall Series, Community Concerts, as well as traveling Broadway musicals.

In 1972 the Allied Arts Council and the City of Yakima began working together to transfer the building to public ownership. Part of this effort included successfully placing the theatre on the National Register of Historic Places on April 11, 1973. Shortly after ownership was transferred to the City, the theatre was severely damaged by a fire on August 11, 1975, except for its stage-house, which was virtually untouched, with only the walls of the audience section remaining standing. One of the few items saved from the fire was a Steinway grand piano (which had been signed by Henry E. Steinway), the president of Steinway and Sons. Subsequently, the theatre was painstakingly renovated to its original 1920s state, although a basement with restrooms and a meeting room was added. Famed artist, Anthony Heinsbergen —who had painted the original murals on the Theatre's ceiling as his first paid commission—came out of retirement to repaint the dome. This was his last commissioned work. Governor Dixie Lee Ray dedicated the rebuilt Capitol Theatre on November 4, 1978 at its grand re-opening ceremony, which featured a sold-out performance by Bob Hope.

== Gallery ==
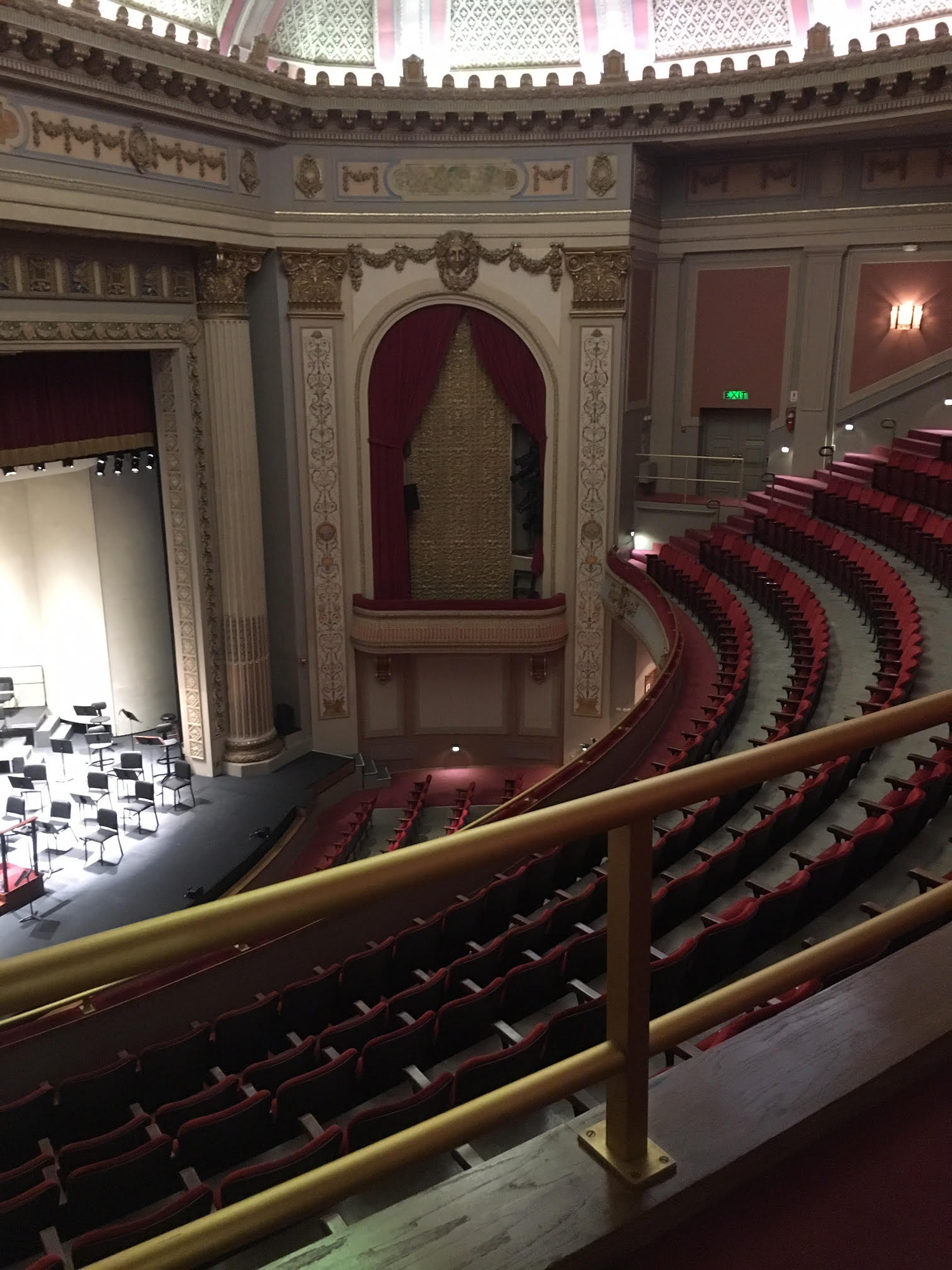

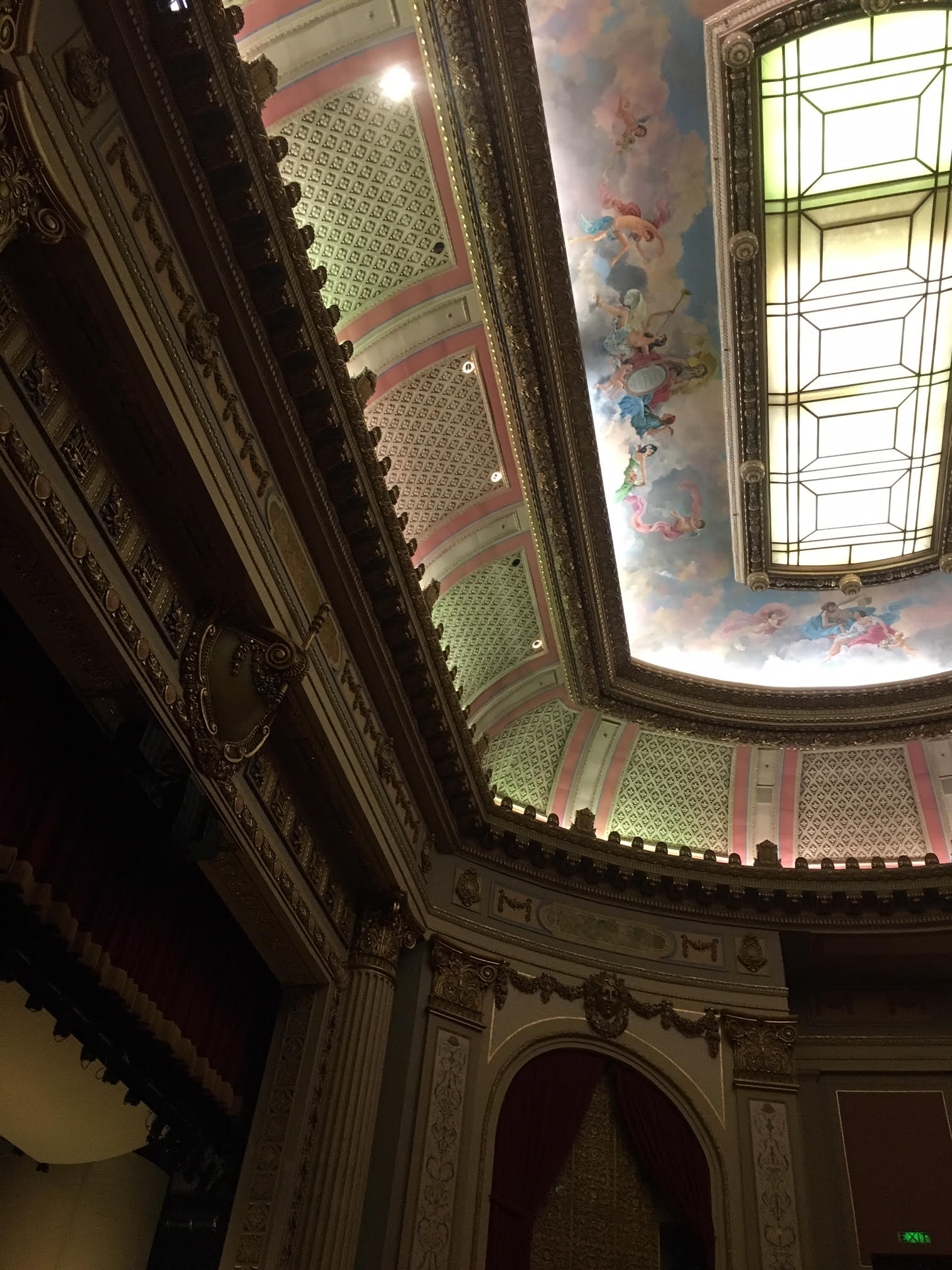

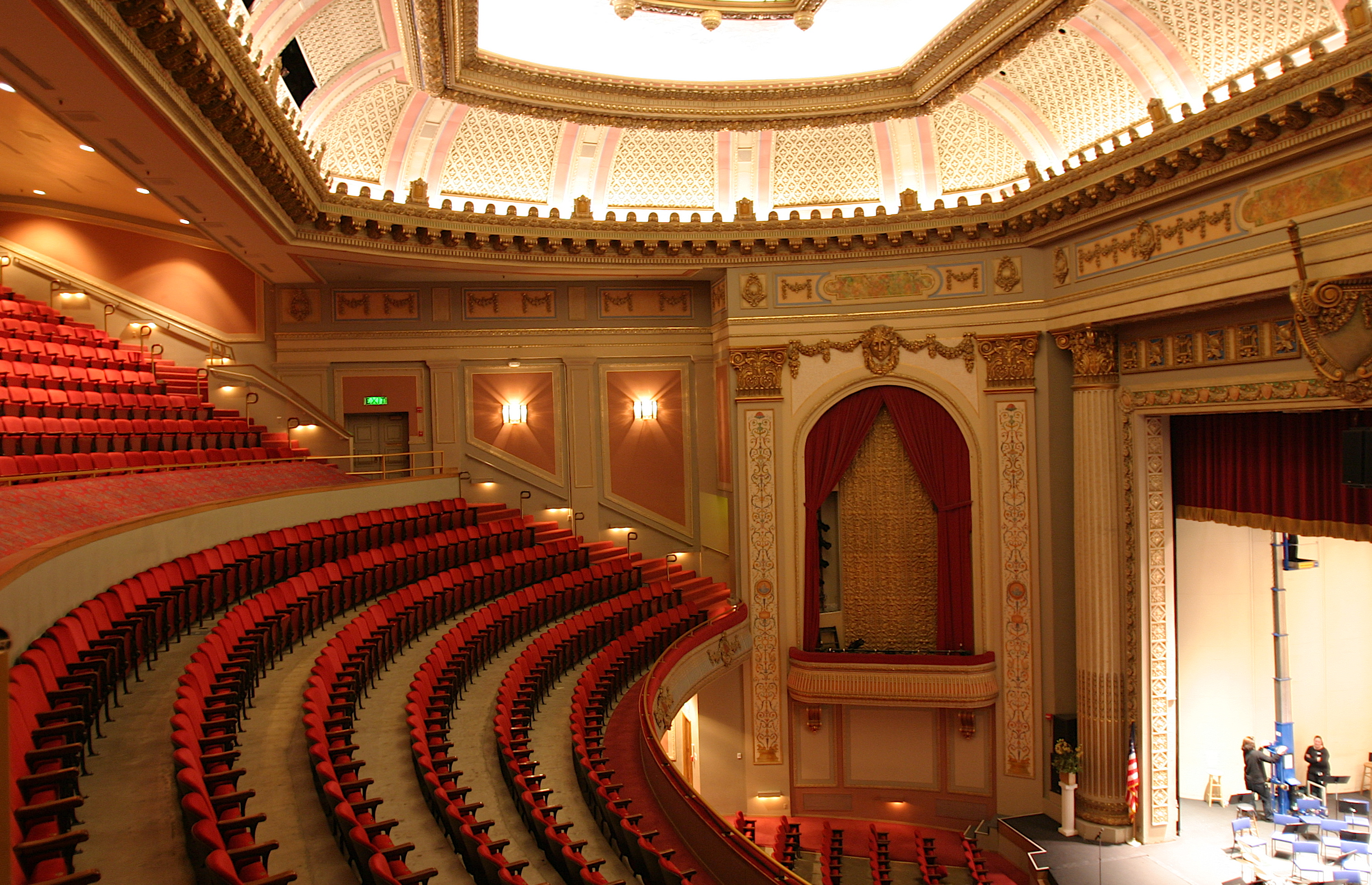
The interior of the theatre

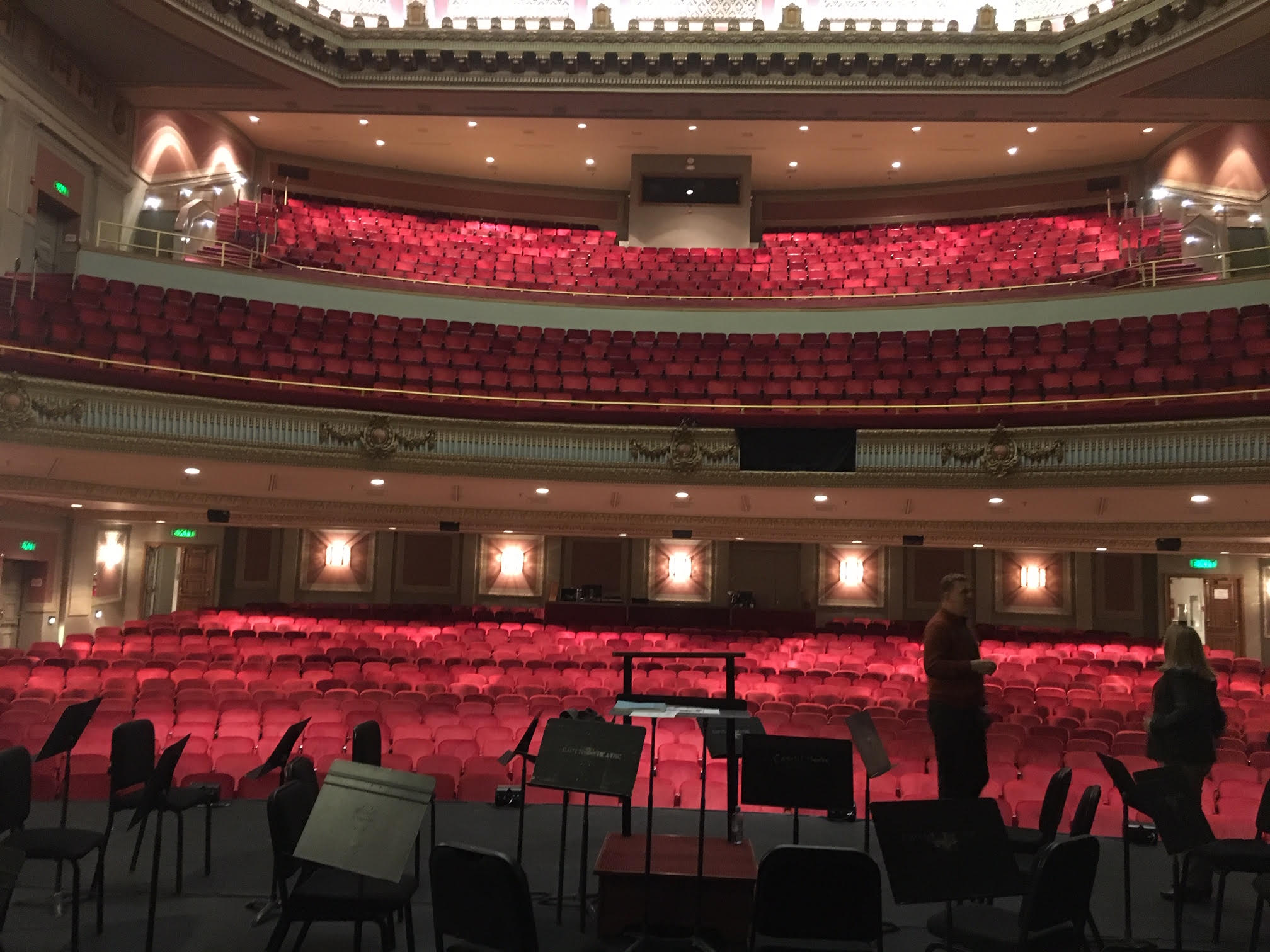

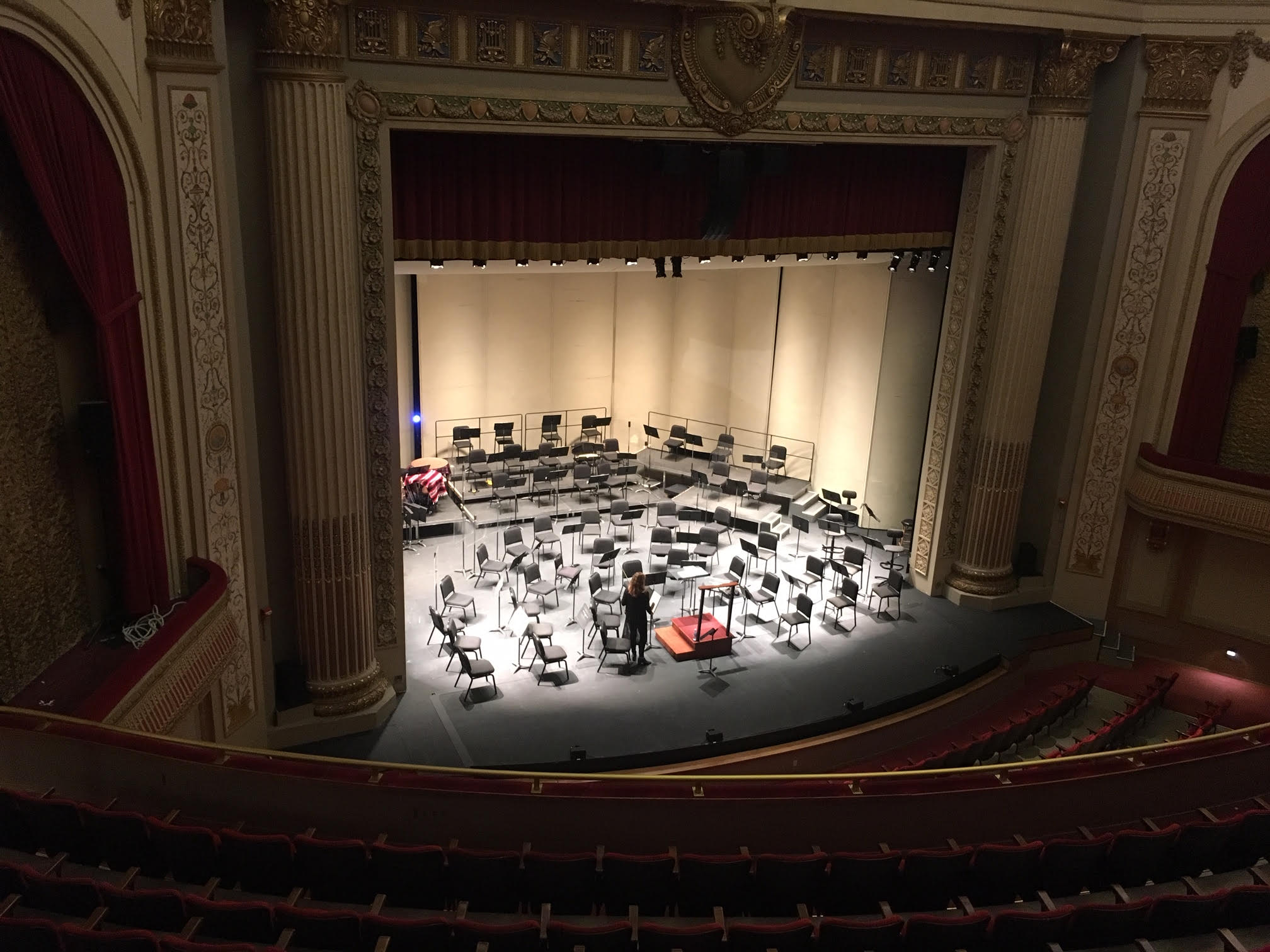
the stage
