= Nuui Cunni Native American Intertribal Cultural Center =

Museum and cultural center in California

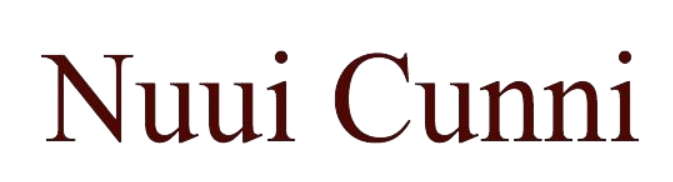

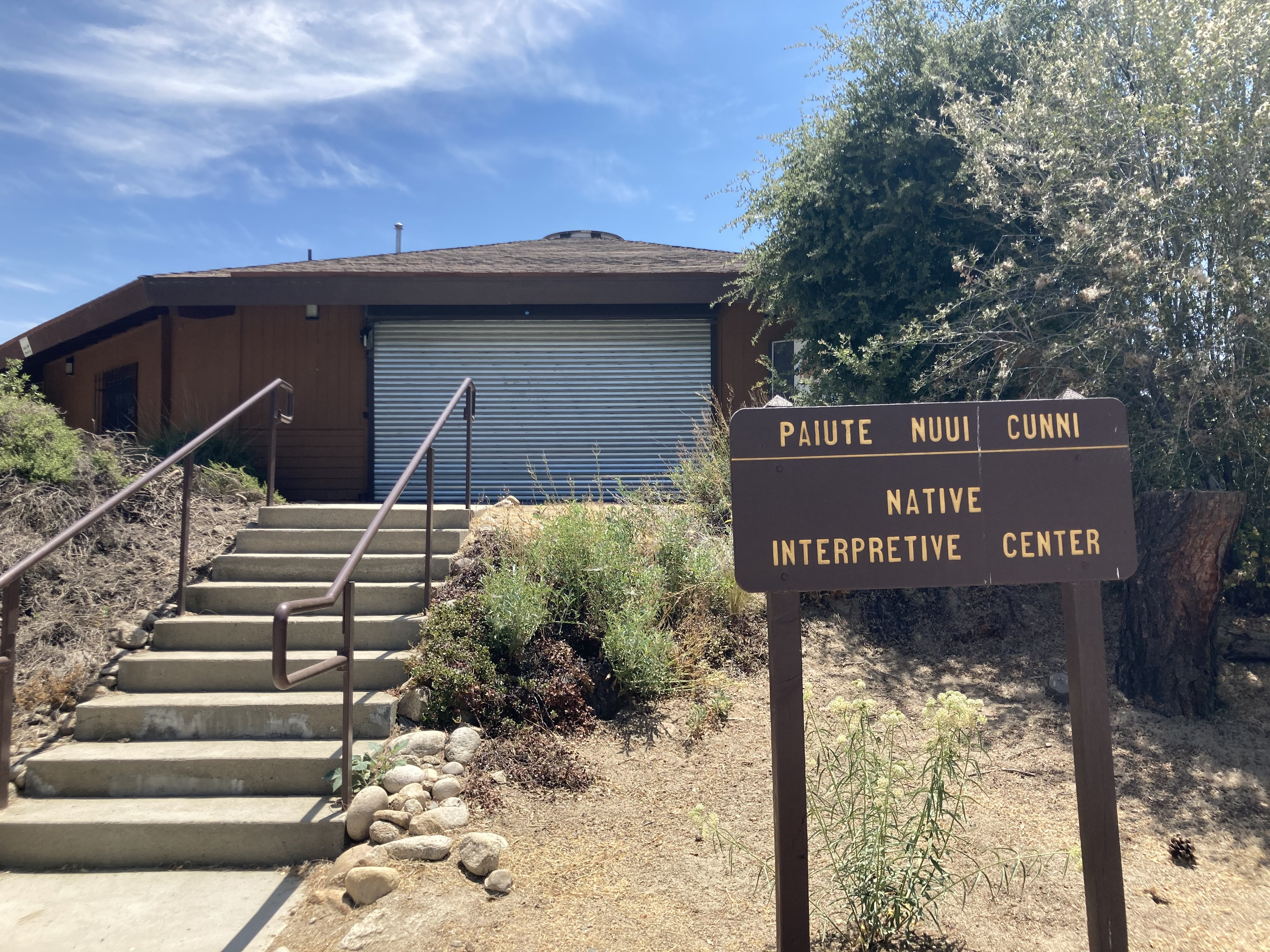
- The exterior of the center in 2023, when closed

- Location within southern California Location within California Location within the United States
- Established: 1992
- Location: 2600 CA-155, Lake Isabella, CA 93240
- Coordinates: 35.6579°N 118.4802°W
- Founder: Kern River Paiute Council
- Owner: United States Forest Service
- Website: nuuicunni.com

The Nuui Cunni Native American Intertribal Cultural Center is a 3,150 sq ft (293 m^{2}) cultural center and museum in Lake Isabella, California. It showcases Native American artifacts and offers free admission. The center is open from 10 AM to 2 PM on Wednesdays, Fridays, and Saturdays. It aims to raise awareness of the Natives who have lived in the San Joaquin Valley and promote their culture. "Nuui Cunni" means "our home" in the Northern Paiute language.

== History ==
The center was established in 1992, and finished in 1997, by Patricia Henry, the chairwoman of the Kern River Paiute Council. It is owned by the United States Forest Service in Sequoia National Forest, which is a couple of miles north of the area. It is currently managed and operated by the council, under a Special Use Permit from the government.

== Activities ==
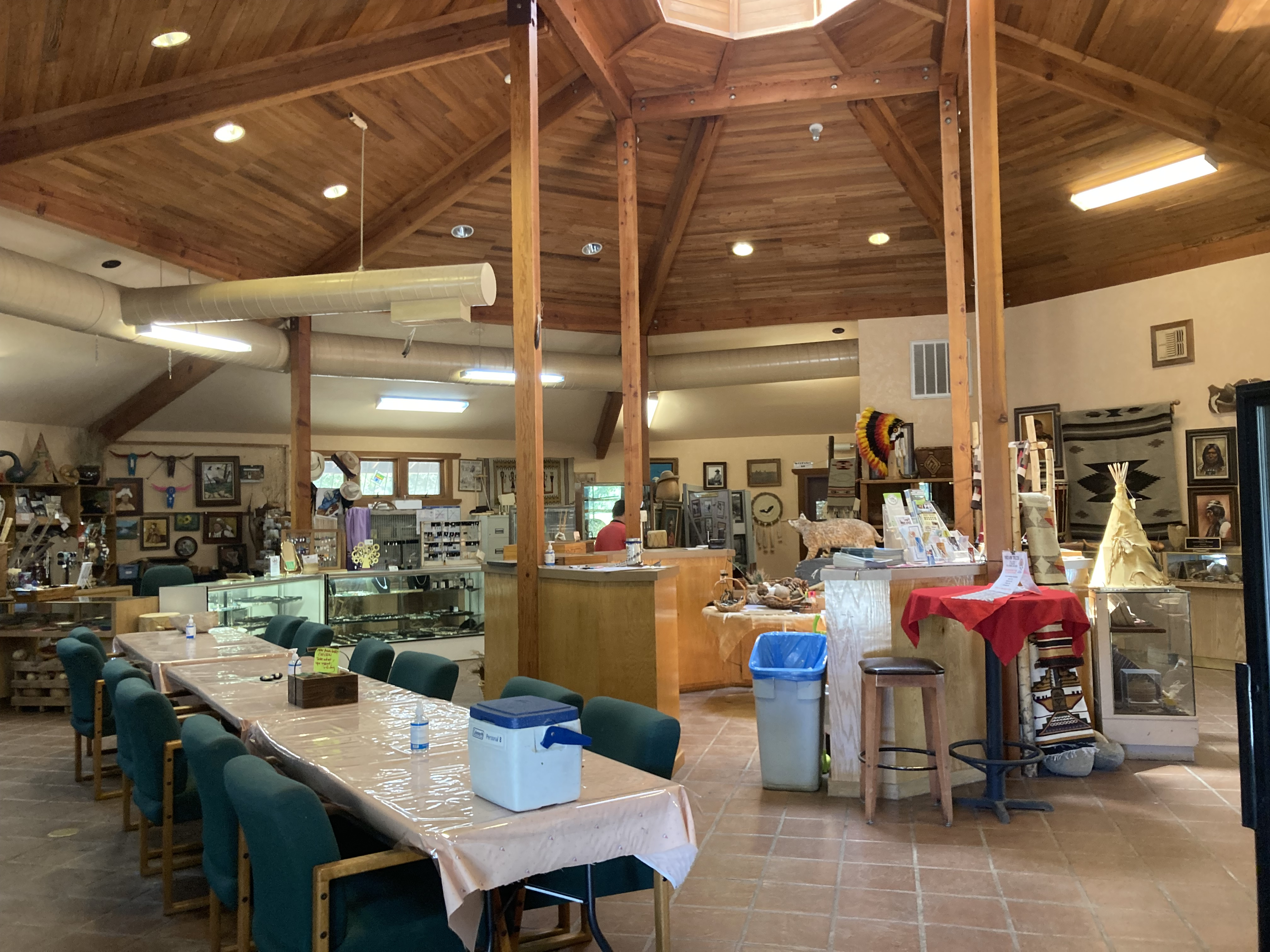
The interior of the center

The center offers craft-making classes on Wednesdays, in which participants learn to make objects inspired by Native American styles, such as basket weaving, knapping, gourd art, and felting. The first class is free, but every class afterward has a fee of $5 for upkeeping and supplies.

The grounds around the center, measuring about 5.6 acres (2.3 hectares), contain over 50 different species of plants native to California. A large group campsite can be reserved nearby. Other facilities include a sweat lodge, tule hut, and prayer garden containing a memorial for the 1863 Keyesville massacre. Some plants are for sale. Frybread is also occasionally sold here.

== Exhibits ==
Artifacts come from tribes including the Shoshone Paiute, Tübatulabal, and Kawaiisu. The center also contains a library and gift shop, selling goods made by Natives.
