= Leggett House (Little Red, Arkansas) =

Historic house in Arkansas, United States

- U.S. National Register of Historic Places
- Location within Arkansas Location within the United States
- Location: AR 124 E of Little Red, Arkansas
- Coordinates: 35°26′56″N 91°43′50″W
- Area: less than one acre
- Architectural style: Vernacular plank wall construction
- MPS: White County MPS
- NRHP reference No.: 91001339
- Added to NRHP: July 13, 1992

The Leggett House is a historic house in rural northern White County, Arkansas. It is located on the north side of Arkansas Highway 124, about 0.5 miles (0.80 km) east of the crossroads hamlet of Little Red. It is a single story structure, built out of horizontal wooden planking, nailed to 4x4 posts at the corners. It is topped by a gable roof and set on stone piers. A box-construction addition extends to the east, and a shed roof porch extends across the southern facade. The house, built about 1870, is the only known plank-framed house in the county.

The house was listed on the National Register of Historic Places in 1992.

== See also ==
- National Register of Historic Places listings in White County, Arkansas
