= Tulare Historical Museum =

- Established: 1980
- Location: 444 West Tulare Avenue, Tulare, California 93274
- Coordinates: 36°12′26″N 119°21′15″W
- Type: Local museum
- Director: Dawn Sabala
- Website: www.tularehistoricalmuseum.org

The Tulare Historical Museum is a local history museum, in Tulare, California, which is owned and operated by the Tulare City Historical Society. It is located at 444 West Tulare Avenue.

== History ==
The Tulare City Historical Society was founded in June 1980 with the intention to build a historical museum. Built on the former site of the Central School, the museum opened on November 16, 1985. A 4,700 square foot (440 m^{2}) addition was completed in 1992.

== Description ==
The museum features exhibits about the history of the indigenous people known as Yokuts, the Southern Pacific Railroad, and the region's non-indigenous pioneers. There are also exhibits devoted to Olympic champion Bob Mathias and United States Navy Admiral Elmo Zumwalt, both Tulare residents, and military memorabilia from the collection of Manuel Toledo. There are rotating art exhibits in the museum's assembly hall, the Heritage Room.
