= Buhach, California =

Unincorporated community in California, United States

Buhach
- Unincorporated community
- Location in California Buhach (the United States)
- Coordinates: 37°20′11″N 120°34′55″W
- Country: United States
- State: California
- County: Merced
- Elevation: 157 ft (48 m)

Buhach is an unincorporated community in Merced County, California, United States. It is located 2 miles (3.2 km) east-southeast of Atwater, at an elevation of 157 feet (48 m).

The Merced Land and Fruit Company established the Buhach Plantation in the area in 1871. The plantation farmed pyrethrum, which was used to make an insect powder called Buhach. Portuguese immigrants settled the area in the mid-1890s, and the company sold them the land which became known as the Buhach Colony. A social hall opened in Buhach in 1903, and the Buhach Grammar School was established in 1907.

== See also ==
- John Buttencourt Avila, father of the sweet potato industry.
