= Kaehler–Rector House =

Historic house in California, United States

- U.S. National Register of Historic Places
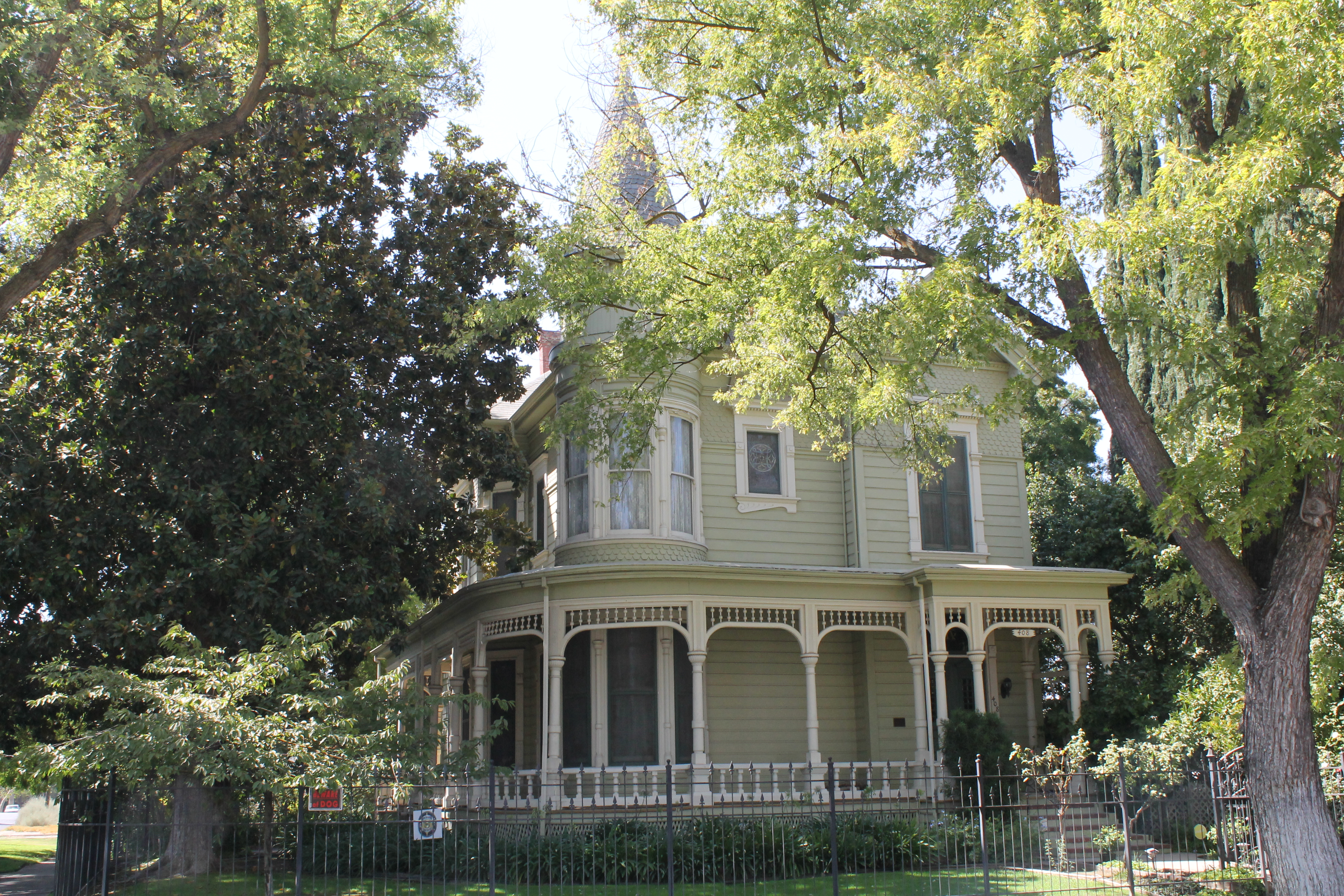

- Location within California Location within the United States
- Location: 408 W. 25th St., Merced, California
- Coordinates: 37°18′31″N 120°28′36″W
- Area: 0.4 acres (0.16 ha)
- Built: 1894
- Architect: Wegner, Louis
- Architectural style: Queen Anne
- NRHP reference No.: 82002206
- Added to NRHP: January 4, 1982

The Kaehler–Rector House is a historic house located at 408 W. 25th St. in Merced, California. Built in the early 1890s, the house was designed by architect Louis Wegner in the Queen Anne style. The house's design includes a corner tower with a conical roof, a veranda extending to the front and east sides of the house, and a complex roof design that includes both gabled and hipped sections. A 1905 history of the San Joaquin Valley called the house "one of the finest in Merced County."

George Kaehler, the house's first owner, was a major liquor distributor in the San Joaquin Valley. In 1903, he sold the house to Judge E. N. Rector, a Merced County Superior Court judge, who lived in the house until his 1941 death.

The Kaehler–Rector House was added to the National Register of Historic Places on January 4, 1982.
