= San Luis Gonzaga Archeological District =

Archaeological site in California, United States

- U.S. National Register of Historic Places
- U.S. Historic district
- Nearest city: Los Banos, California
- Area: 501.4 acres (202.9 ha)
- NRHP reference No.: 73000412
- Added to NRHP: May 7, 1973

The San Luis Gonzaga Archeological District is an archaeological historic district located within the San Luis Reservoir State Recreation Area in the eastern Diablo Range, in Merced County, California.

It is near Los Banos and the western edge of the San Joaquin Valley.

== Description ==
The district includes five midden deposits which indicate the location of prehistoric villages.

The site of the village of Hahnomah, which was inhabited by the Kahwatchwah Yokuts, is also located in the district.

The district was added to the National Register of Historic Places on May 7, 1973.
