= William Saroyan House Museum =

William Saroyan House-Museum
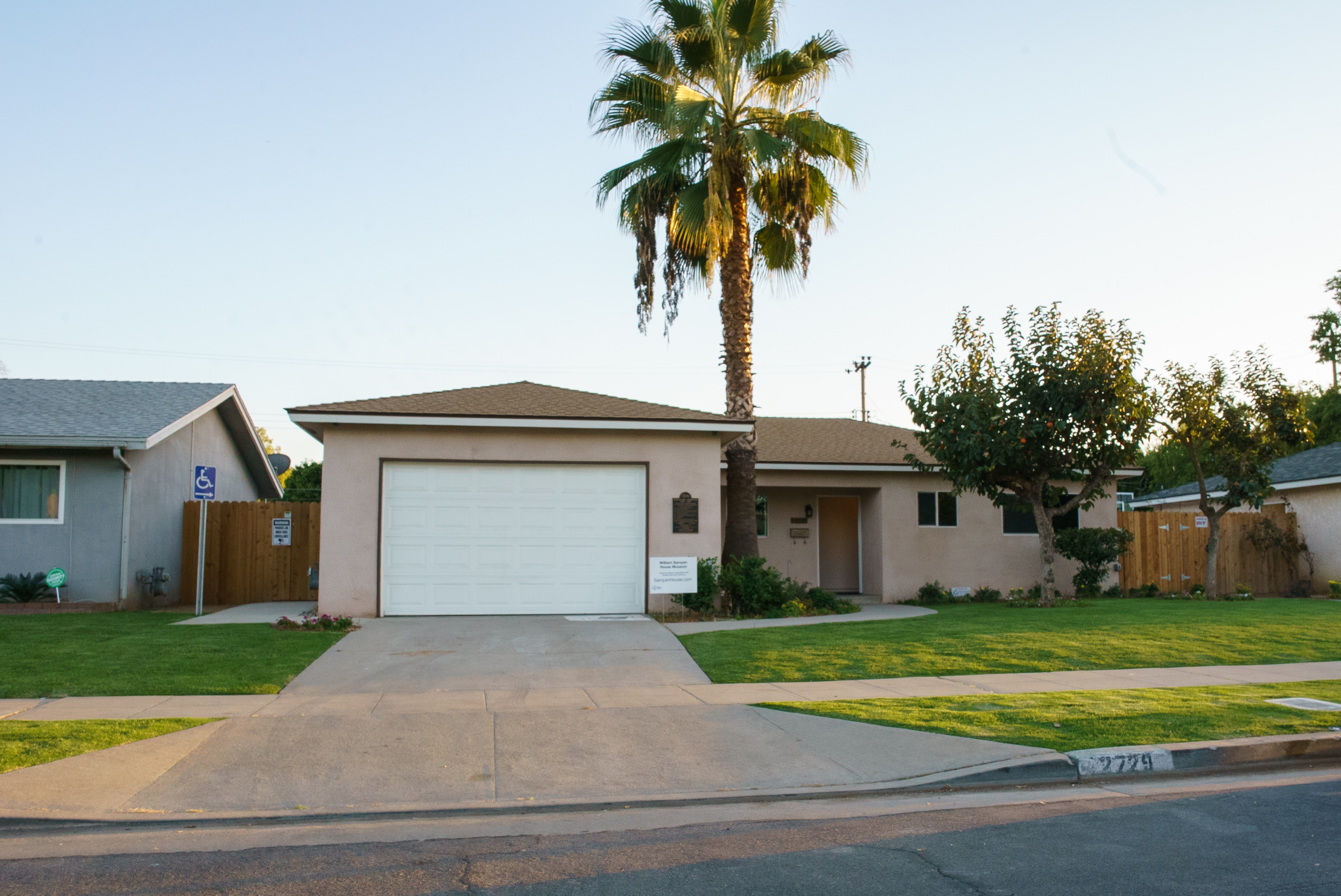
- The William Saroyan House-Museum building
- Established: 2018
- Location: 2729 W Griffith Way; Fresno, California 93705; United States
- Coordinates: 36.7899°N 119.8428°W
- Type: Historic house museum
- Curator: Karen Mirzoyan
- Website: www.saroyanhouse.com

The William Saroyan House Museum founded on August 31, 2018, in Fresno, California is a single subject museum on the writer William Saroyan. The museum is located at 2729 W Griffith Way, the last occupied Fresno residence of the writer.

== History ==
The home was purchased by William Saroyan in 1964. It was a newly built tract home in a developing area of Fresno. In that same year, Saroyan also purchased the adjacent home, which he used for storage. Following his death on May 18, 1981, the home was sold to private owners. On April 2, 1989, the house was placed on the historical registries of the City of Fresno and Fresno County.

An unsuccessful attempt was made to turn the home into a museum, which resulted in a foreclosure on the property. The home was purchased in 2016 by the Renaissance Cultural and Intellectual Foundation, a foreign corporation registered in Armenia, and established by Artur Janibekyan. The Renaissance Cultural and Intellectual Foundation US branch is registered in California as a nonprofit under Internal Revenue Code (IRC) Section 50l (c)(3), and is the legal owners and operators of the museum. The Renaissance Foundation was granted a permit to reconstruct the home at 2729 W. Griffith Way for eventual operation as a museum, following a formal approval process with the City of Fresno for a Conditional Use Permit (CUP).

Construction on the museum was completed in 2018, and a ribbon cutting ceremony and official opening was held on August 31, 2018, the 110th anniversary of the writer's birth. A bronze plaque (Saroyan Historical Marker No. 3) was affixed to the face of the home in 1989, noting the published works created by Saroyan from the period of 1964 until 1981, and listing the individuals of the William Saroyan Festival Committee who had been instrumental in having the home placed on the historic registry. The original plaque disappeared in 2015, and as part of the re-dedication and official opening, a new plaque was installed on August 31, 2018, with the original information plus listing the information for the re-dedication.

== Concept ==
The proposed concept of the museum was to present the character and nature of William Saroyan, through several technical exhibits. The museum contains 2 motion activated walls. One wall displays photos of Saroyan, his family, friends, and residences. A second wall displays a sampling of sketches and paintings by Saroyan. In addition, a variety of videos are displayed, as well as a sampling of published Saroyan books. A final display contains a hologram with an actor portraying Saroyan in the form of a hologram image, and original audio of Saroyan's voice.
