= Maj. George Beecher Cook House =

Historic house in California, United States

- U.S. National Register of Historic Places
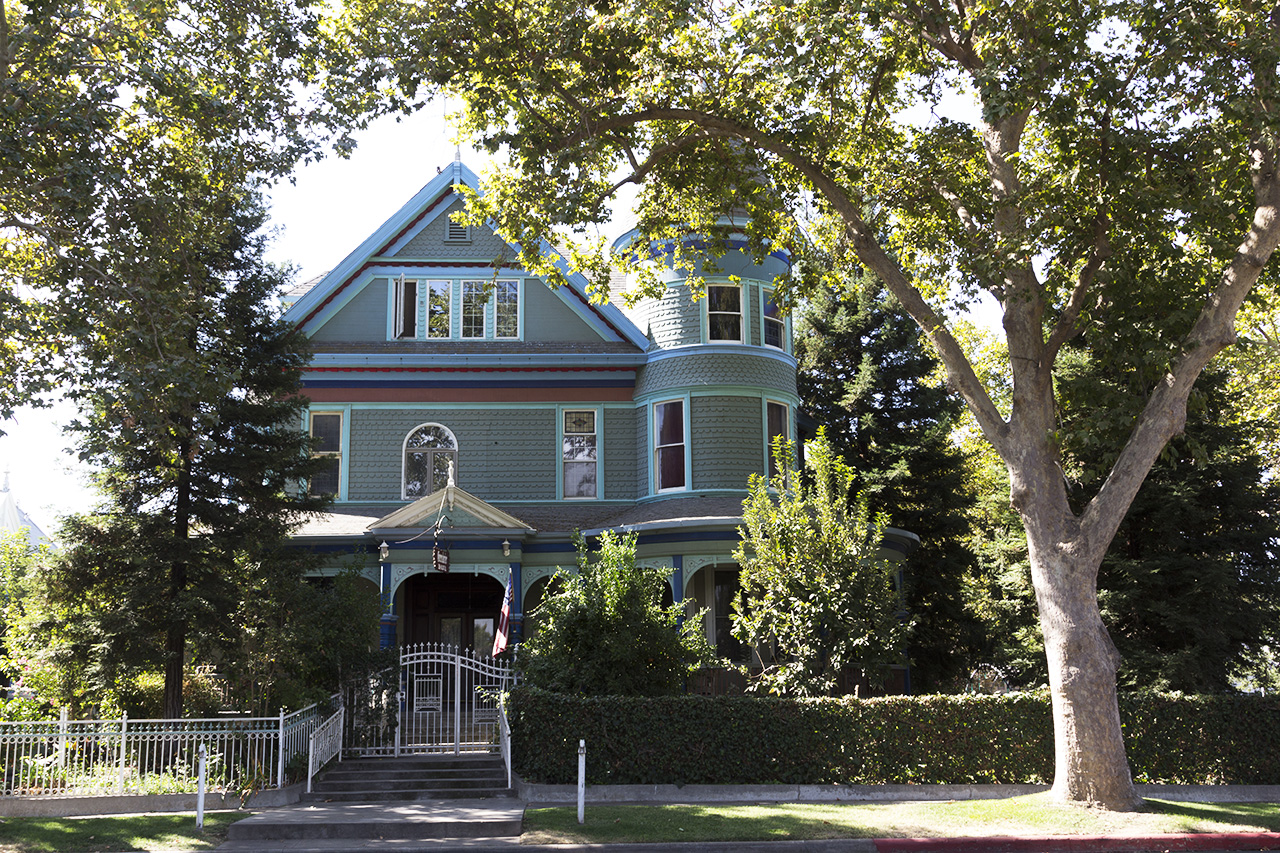

- Location within California Location within the United States
- Location: 356 W. 21st St., Merced, California
- Coordinates: 37°18′17″N 120°28′42″W
- Area: 0.3 acres (0.12 ha)
- Built: c. 1887
- Built by: P. A. Buell & Co.
- Architectural style: Queen Anne
- NRHP reference No.: 83001207
- Added to NRHP: September 15, 1983

The Maj. George Beecher Cook House is a historic house located at 356 W. 21st St. in Merced, California. Built c. 1887, the house was designed in the Queen Anne style; it is considered one of the best examples of the style in Merced. The house's asymmetrical design features a cylindrical tower, open porches in the front and back, and a 7-sided bay on the west side. The roof of the house includes many different designs; the main roof pattern is a gable roof from the front to the back, but the roof also has a pyramidal section in the center, a cross gable on the east side, hipped dormers, and a cone-shaped roof on the tower. The house uses horizontal siding on its first floor and patterned shingle siding on its upper floors.

Major George Beecher Cook, a mayor of Merced and local merchant, lived in the house until his death in 1898. The house was later used as a sanitarium and boarding house until 1943, when Alfred Green and his wife bought the property. The Greens converted the house to a guest house, which they named "The Greenbrier" for their last name and Mrs. Green's maiden name, Brier.

The Maj. George Beecher Cook House was added to the National Register of Historic Places on September 15, 1983.
