= Thomas H. Leggett House =

Historic house in California, United States

- U.S. National Register of Historic Places
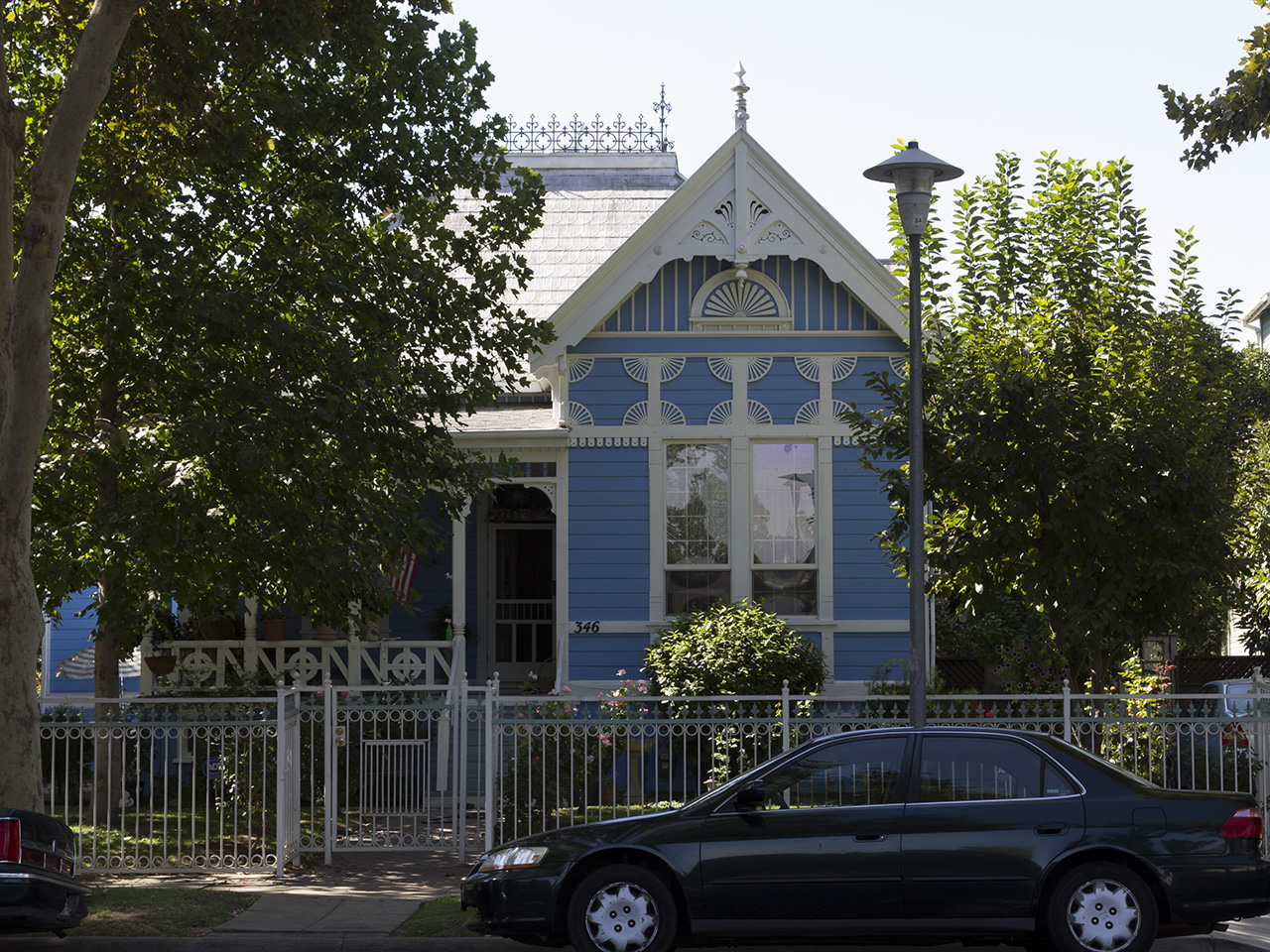

- Location within California Location within the United States
- Location: 346 W. 21st St., Merced, California
- Coordinates: 37°18′16″N 120°28′42″W
- Area: 0.3 acres (0.12 ha)
- Built: c. 1890
- Architectural style: Queen Anne
- NRHP reference No.: 82002207
- Added to NRHP: July 8, 1982

The Thomas H. Leggett House is a historic house located at 346 W. 21st St. in Merced, California. Built circa 1890, the house is designed in the Queen Anne style and also features elements of the Stick and Eastlake style. The front and west sides of the house feature decorative projecting gables; a frieze decorated with quarter sunbursts lies below the gables. The roof is topped by a widow's walk with a decorative iron railing. Thomas H. Leggett, a Merced County law officer and Merced postmaster, built and owned the house.

The Thomas H. Leggett House was added to the National Register of Historic Places on July 8, 1982. The Leggett House, another home in Merced owned by Leggett, is also on the National Register.
