= Merced Theatre (Merced, California) =

Coordinates: 37.30052918°N 120.4804033°W

- U.S. National Register of Historic Places
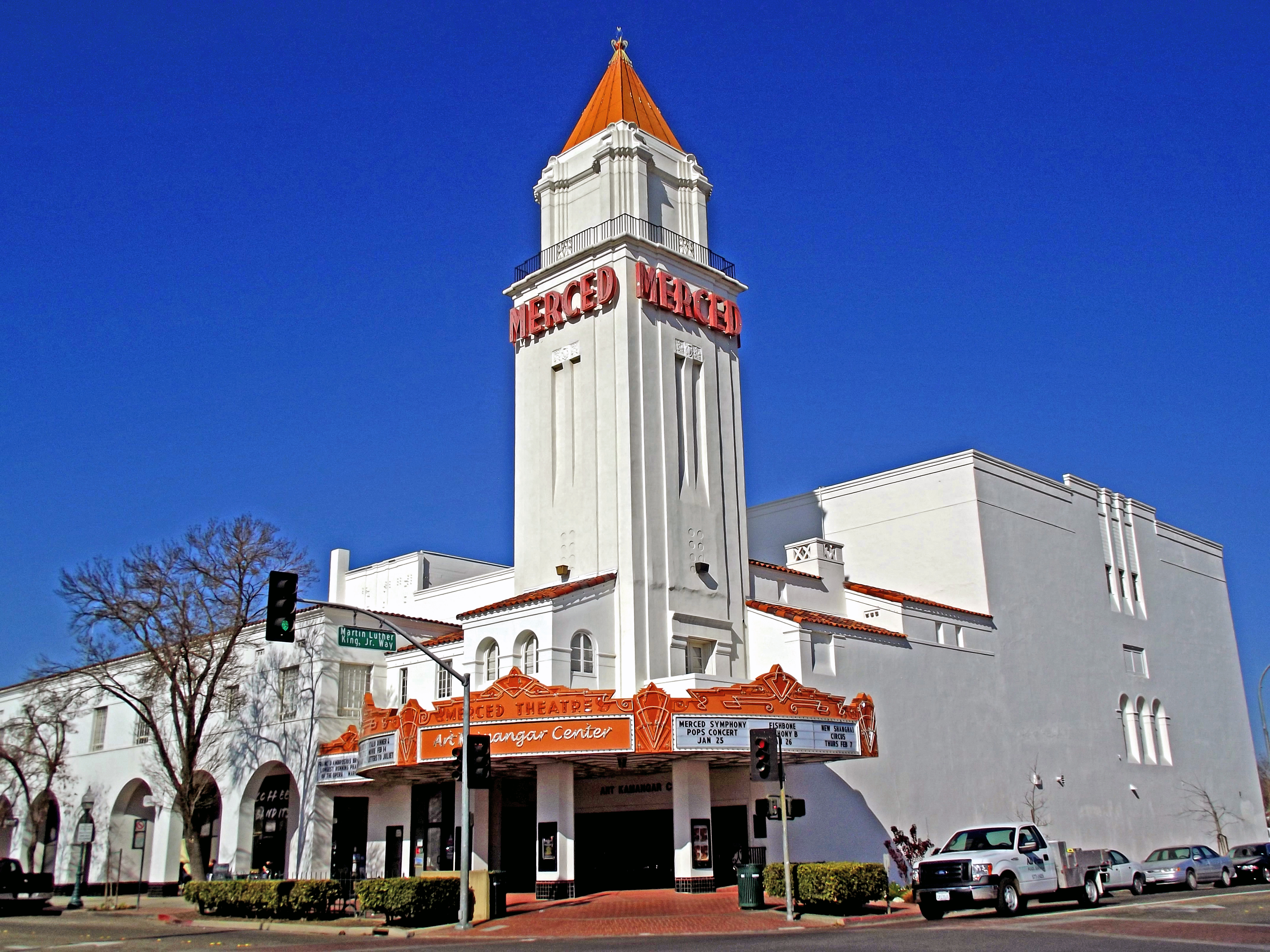
- Location: 301 W. Main St., Merced, California
- Area: 0.52 acres (2,100 m^{2})
- Built: 1931
- Architect: James William Reid, Merritt Jonathan Reid
- Architectural style: Spanish Colonial Revival style
- Website: www.mercedtheatre.org
- NRHP reference No.: 09000248
- Added to NRHP: May 1, 2009

The Merced Theatre is located at 301 W. Main Street, at the corner of Main Street and Martin Luther King Way, in Merced, California. The theatre is significant both for its role as the social and cultural center of Merced from the Depression through the post World War II era and for its mix of Art Deco and Spanish Colonial Revival architecture. The property was added to the National Register of Historic Places (NRHP) on May 1, 2009 and the listing was announced as the featured listing in the National Park Service's weekly list of June 5, 2009.

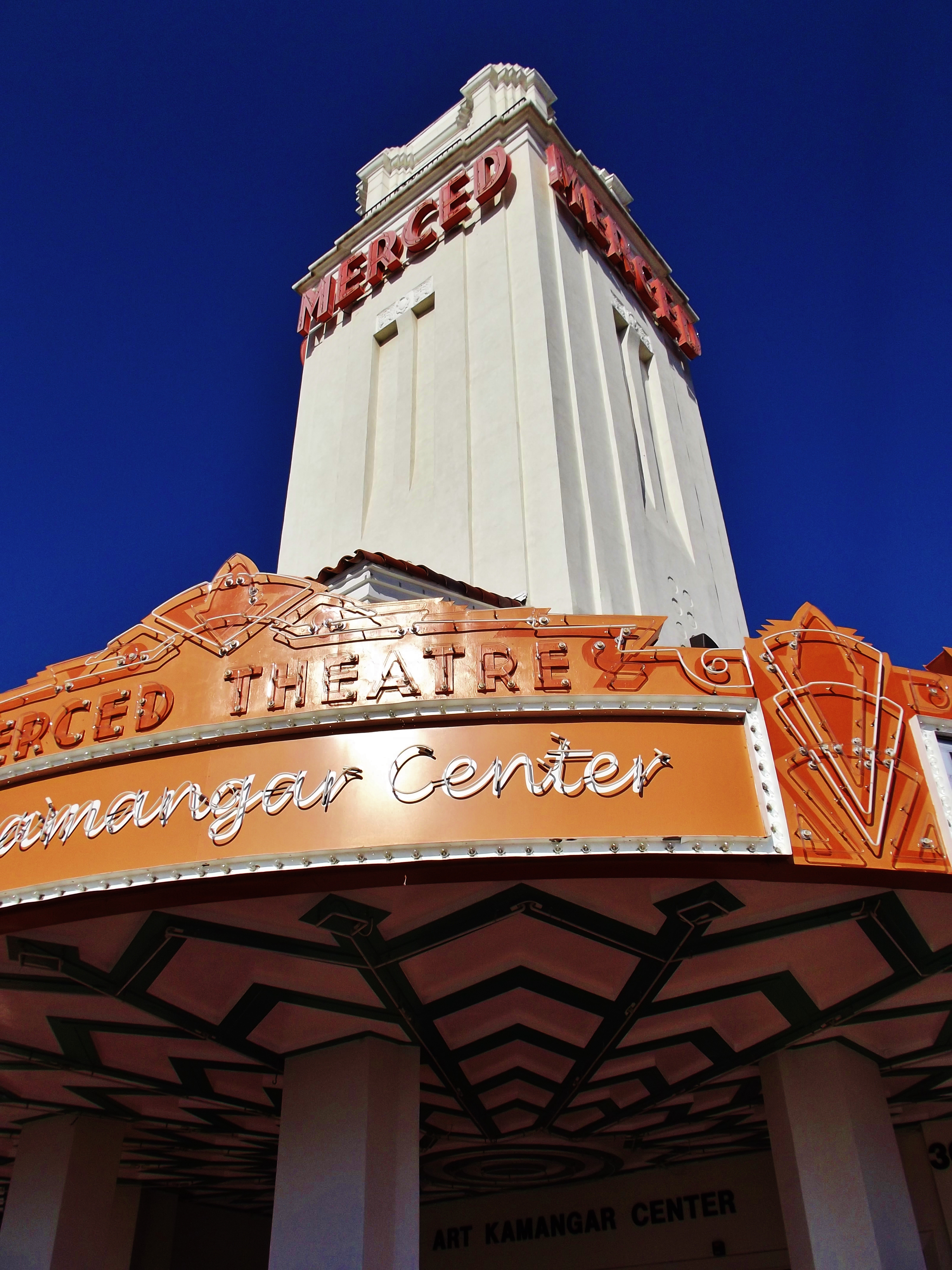

The Golden State Theatre Company hired San Francisco architects the Reid Brothers to design the Merced Theatre. Another notable building they designed is the Hotel del Coronado in San Diego, California. They used what was at the time the most modern projection and sound technology, and the theatre was only the second building in Merced to have an air conditioning system. Their use of dramatic atmospheric features included castle facades and ventilators that sent "clouds" floating across the star-bespeckled ceiling.

Builder Gian Battista Pasqualetti used steel from the Golden Gate Iron Works, ornamental iron from the San Jose Iron Works, and ornamental tiles from the Hispano Maresque Tile Company in Los Angeles to construct the Reid Brothers design for the multi-level, white stucco coated steel framed reinforced concrete building. A 100-foot (30 m) high tower rises above the marquee, and the orange neon block letters proclaiming MERCED can be seen for miles.

The lobby includes a mural of Spanish exploration done by Dutch-born artist Antoon Bonaventure Heinsbergen. Original furnishings include Spanish style wooden sofas and chairs. The theatre originally seated 1,645 for filmed and live performances. For a time the Merced Theatre was part of the United Artist chain of theatres. In the early 1980s the theatre was divided into 4 sections cutting off the entire balcony section from the main theater and splitting both. Over time the theater has suffered some wear and tear, but received a full restoration near to its original single full stage and screen design and currently has a full season of touring shows and films.

== See also ==
- Merced Theatre (Los Angeles, California)
