= Tioga Hotel =

- U.S. National Register of Historic Places
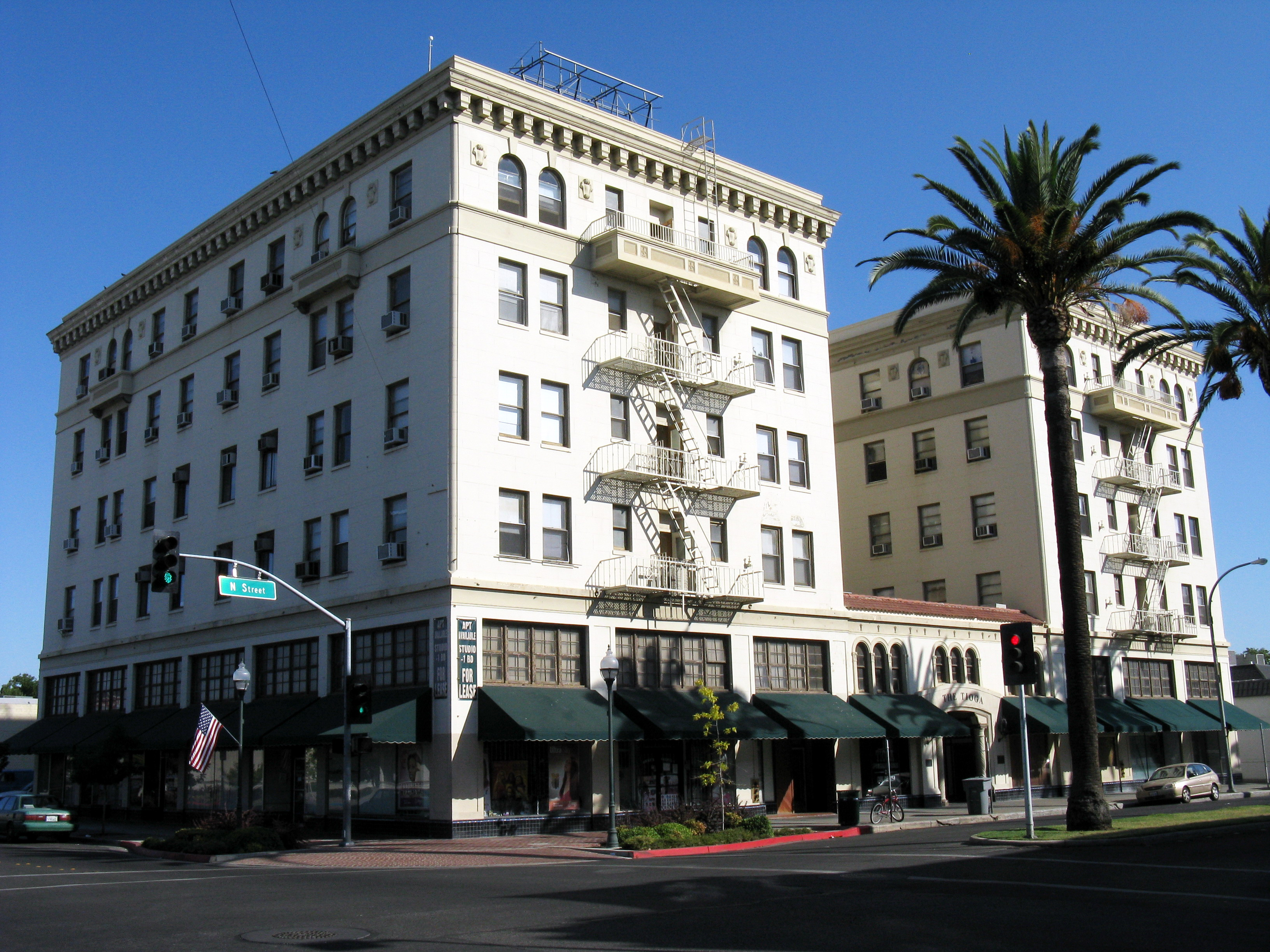

- Location within California Location within the United States
- Location: 1715 N St., Merced, California
- Coordinates: 37°18′8″N 120°29′8″W
- Area: 0.4 acres (0.16 ha)
- Built: 1928
- Architect: McLeran, Ralph, & Co.
- Architectural style: Renaissance
- NRHP reference No.: 80000821
- Added to NRHP: October 3, 1980

The Tioga Hotel is a historic hotel building located at 1715 N St. in Merced, California. Built in 1928, the hotel is the largest building in Merced. The hotel's architecture reflects the transitional design common in 1920s hotels, which were moving away from the Classical Revival designs used in hotels in the past. In addition, the building boasted Merced's first neon sign. The Tioga Hotel was a grand hotel which hosted prominent guests, including Eleanor Roosevelt, Calvin Coolidge, Mary Pickford, and various foreign royalty. During World War II, the hotel played a role in the war effort; the U.S. Air Force used a floor of the building for offices, and various organizations held wartime fundraisers in its lobby and ballrooms. After the war, manager Gyle Miller returned the hotel to its former prominence; in the following decades, the hotel hosted film stars and served as a center for agricultural trade. The rise of automobile travel ultimately led to the hotel's decline, and it was converted to a residential apartment building.

The Tioga Hotel was added to the National Register of Historic Places on October 3, 1980. In 2011, financial discrepancies were discovered resulting in a discovery of an embezzlement operation and the arrest of the property manager, James M. Hiestand. As of 2018, The Tioga has taken on new management, GSF Properties, Inc., in order to bring life back to the community. A $15 million renovation project began that transformed the building back into the hotel it once was. It is now a mission of GSF's to ensure The Tioga's guest feel safe, taken care of, and proud to call The Tioga their home, as well as to bring this historic site back to the eyes of the community, in hopes this massive renovation helps to fuel the major transformation of Downtown Merced and its surrounding communities.
