= Bloss Mansion =

Historic house in California, United States

- U.S. National Register of Historic Places
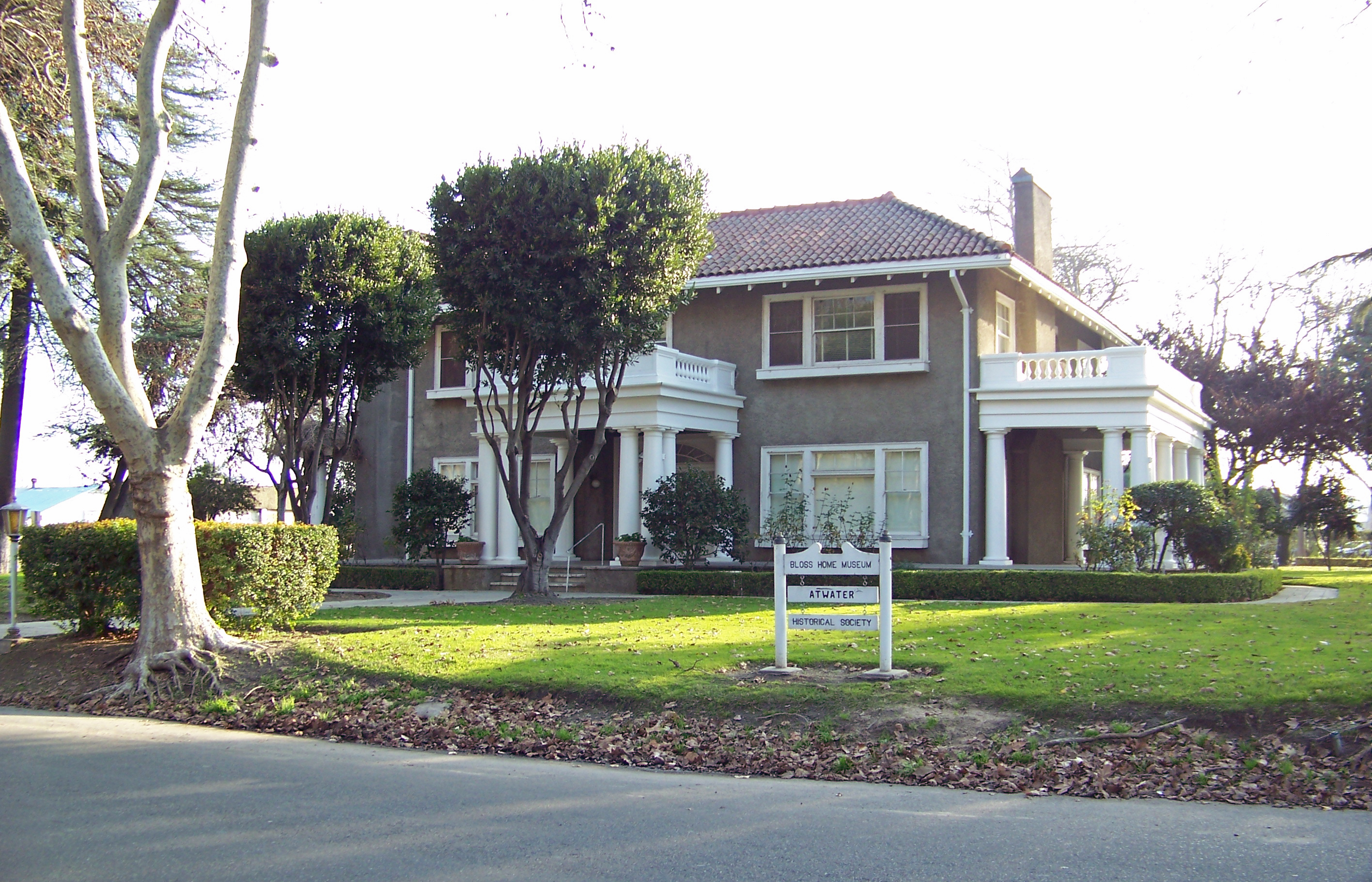

- Location within California Location within the United States
- Location: 1020 Cedar Ave., Atwater, California
- Coordinates: 37°20′51″N 120°36′19″W
- Area: 1.8 acres (0.73 ha)
- Built: 1914
- Architect: Bedesen & Cowell; Wilcox & Groom
- Architectural style: Mission Revival, Prairie Style
- NRHP reference No.: 81000162
- Added to NRHP: September 3, 1981

The Bloss Mansion is a historic house located at 1020 Cedar Ave. in Atwater, California. The house was built in 1914 by George Bloss, the first mayor of Atwater and a prominent donor to the city. The house's design reflects several popular architectural styles of its era. The Mission Revival Style had the greatest influence on the structure, as exhibited in its stucco construction and tile roof. Prairie School elements of the house include its three-part windows, broad eaves, and overall emphasis, while the house's front entrance and side porch have a Classical design with Tuscan columns.

Bloss donated the house to the city in 1963; it now houses the Atwater Historical Society and the Atwater Chamber of Commerce.

The Bloss Mansion was added to the National Register of Historic Places on September 3, 1981.
