= Leggett House (Merced, California) =

Historic house in California, United States

- U.S. National Register of Historic Places
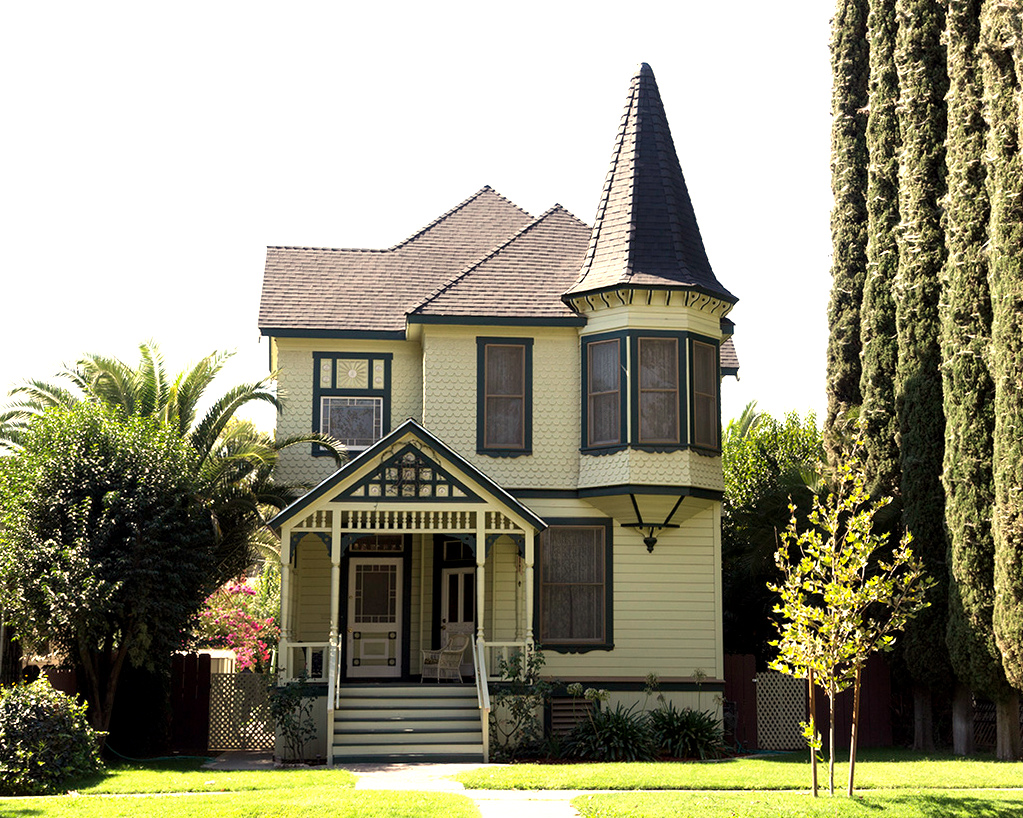

- Location within California Location within the United States
- Location: 352 W. 22nd St, Merced, California
- Coordinates: 37°18′19″N 120°28′40″W
- Built: 1884
- Architect: Herron, E.M.
- Architectural style: Queen Anne-Victorian architecture
- NRHP reference No.: 79000501
- Added to NRHP: October 25, 1979

The Leggett House in Merced, California, also known as Queen Anne Inn, is a historic house located at 352 W. 22nd St. in Merced, California. The house was built in the Queen Anne style of Victorian architecture. Its most prominent feature is the Witch's Cap on its roof, a cone-shaped turret with eight scalloped hips. The home's design also includes a steep shingle roof, gables on the porch and sides of the house, and horizontal shiplap and fish scale shingle siding on its first and second floors respectively. E. M. Herron, a local rancher, built the home in 1884; he later sold it to pioneer and Merced postmaster Thomas H. Leggett, who operated a jewelry store in the house's parlor.

The Leggett House was listed on the National Register of Historic Places on October 25, 1979. The Thomas H. Leggett House, another house in Merced owned by Leggett, is also listed on the National Register.
