= Buhach Grammar School =

- U.S. National Register of Historic Places
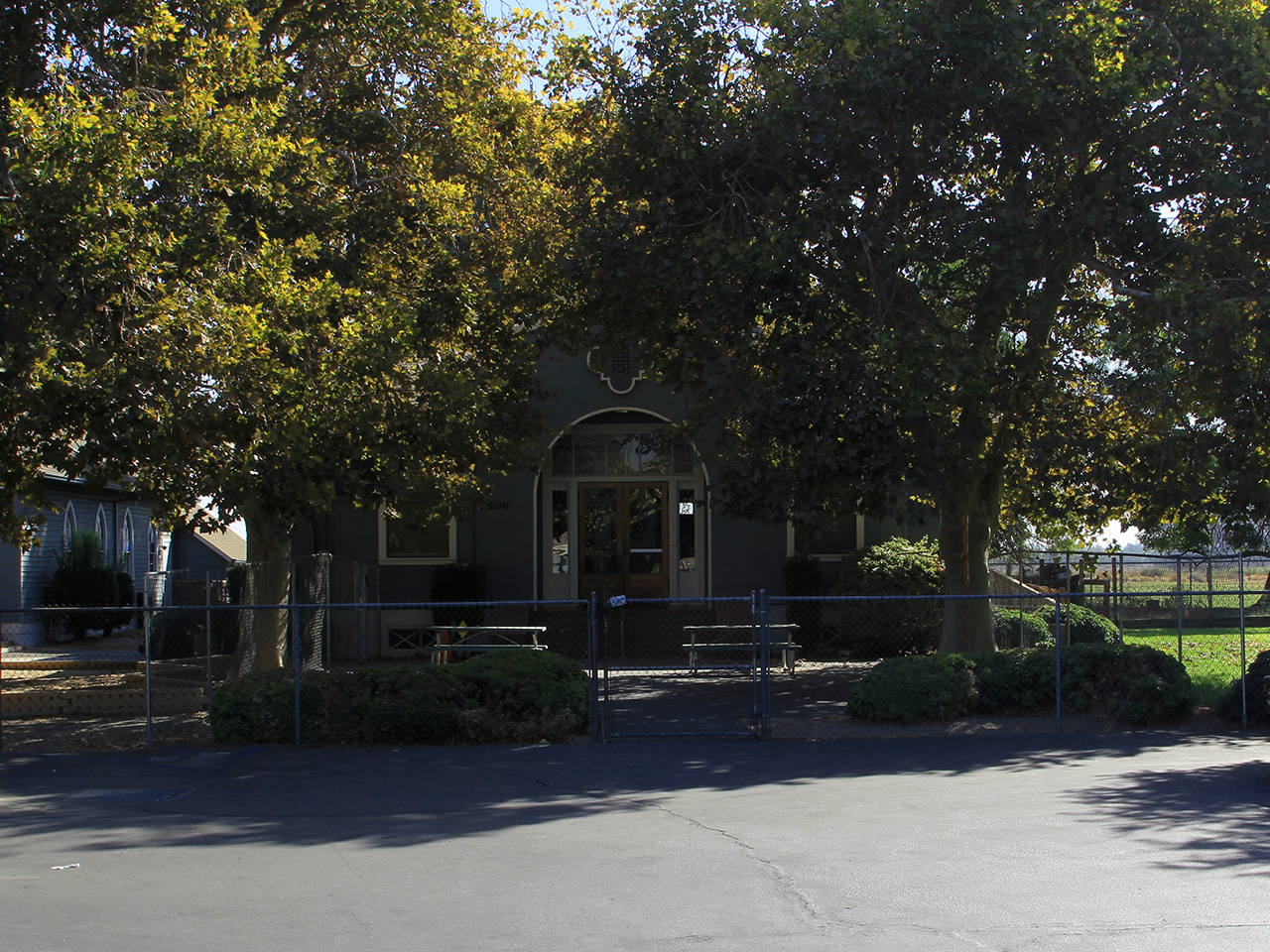

- Location within California Location within the United States
- Nearest city: Merced, California
- Coordinates: 37°19′32″N 120°34′36″W
- Area: 1 acre (0.40 ha)
- Built: 1907
- Architect: Bedesen, William
- Architectural style: Mission Revival
- NRHP reference No.: 83001206
- Added to NRHP: April 7, 1983

The Buhach Grammar School is a historic school which served the community of Buhach, California. The school opened in 1907 to serve Buhach's population of Portuguese immigrants who worked at the Buhach Plantation. The school was designed in the Mission Revival style and features a bell-gable front and an arched entryway with a decorative quatrefoil above it. The wood frame and clapboard construction of the school is unusual for the style, as Mission Revival buildings generally used stucco. The school closed in 1950 when Buhach's school district consolidated with the McSwain District; the building was later used to store sweet potatoes and ultimately converted into a preschool.

The Buhach Grammar School was added to the National Register of Historic Places on April 7, 1983.
