= Yuriko Domoto Tsukada =

- Born: April 6, 1915; Oakland
- Died: November 13, 2004 (aged 89); Catskill (town)
- Alma mater: University of California, Berkeley; Simmons University
- Occupation: Social worker
- Relatives: Kaneji Domoto

Yuriko Domoto Tsukada (April 6, 1915 – November 13, 2004) was an American social worker. A nisei, she was interred in the Merced Assembly Center and the Granada War Relocation Center during World War II. She worked with victims of sexual abuse and founded the first Emergency Room Rape Crisis Program in New York.

Yuriko Domoto was born on April 6, 1915 in Oakland, California. She was the daughter of Kanetaro "Thomas" Domoto and Teru (Morita) Domoto. Kanetaro Domoto immigrated to the United States from Japan in 1884 at the age of 18. He founded the Domoto Brothers nursery in Oakland in 1891 and specialized in bonsai.

Yuriko Domoto attended the University of California, Berkeley as an undergraduate and earned a graduate certificate in social work in 1940. She was working as a social worker for the Alameda County Charities Commission when Japanese internment began. In 1942, her family were incarcerated in Merced Assembly Center and the Granada War Relocation Center, where she stayed until 1944. Her father died at Granada in 1943. In 1981, she testified to the Commission on Wartime Relocation and Internment of Civilians about her experiences during internment and the negative effects of internment on people, particularly those with mental or physical disabilities.

She married Richard “Dick” Hiroshi Tsukada and they settled in New Rochelle, New York in 1945. She earned a Master of Social Work degree in 1946 from Simmons College. At Jacobi Hospital in the Bronx, she established New York State's first Emergency Room Rape Crisis Program in the early 1970s. She later served as Director of Services for Abused and Sexually Assaulted in the Department of Social Work at Bronx Municipal Hospital Center. She was posthumously named a social work pioneer by the National Association of Social Workers Foundation.

Yuriko Domoto Tsukada died on 13 November 2004 in Catskill, New York.
