= Merced County Fairgrounds =

Annual county fair in Merced, California, USA

Coordinates: 37°17′29″N 120°29′06.1″W

Merced County Fair
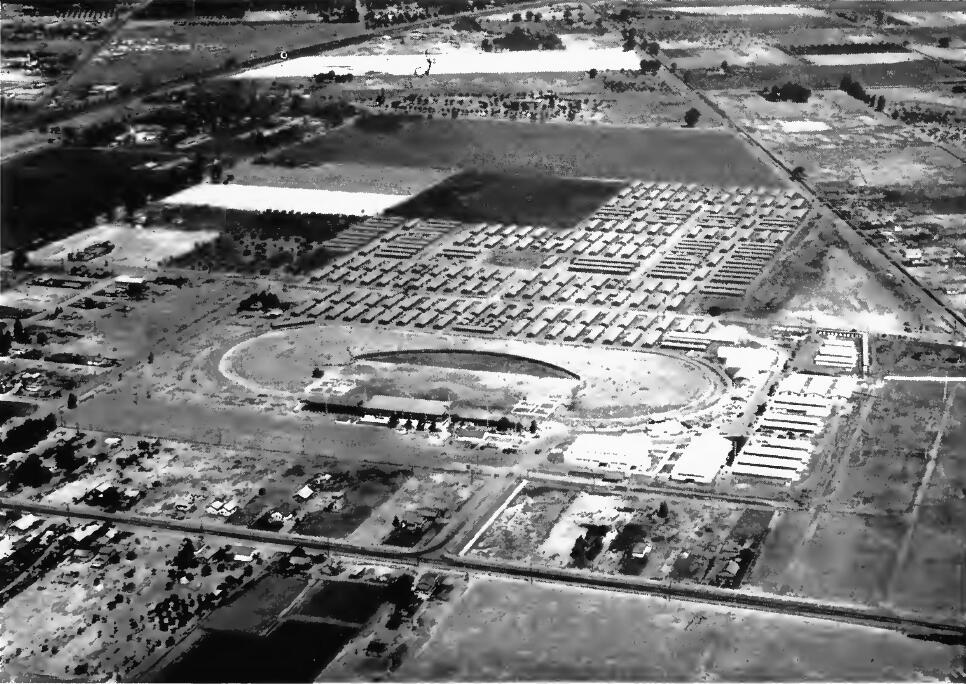
- Merced County Fairgrounds in 1942
- Genre: County fair
- Frequency: Annually, for 5 days in June
- Locations: Merced, California
- Years active: 1891–1916, 1919–1935, 1937–1942, 1946–2019, 2022– (no fair during WWI from 1917–18, 1936, WWII from 1943-45, nor 2020-21 due to the COVID-19 pandemic)
- Founded: 1891
- Attendance: 0 in 2020-21
- Website: mercedcountyfair.com

The Merced County Fairgrounds are home to the annual Merced County Fair, the county fair of Merced County, California. The Merced County Fair was first held on September 2, 1891. The first fair was held on 18th Street in Merced and was a joint county fair with neighboring Mariposa County. The Merced County Fair showcases livestock, exhibits, carnival rides, music and fair food each year.

== History ==
Phil Vassar, country music artist, at the Merced County Fair in 2007

Merced County has held a county fair since 1891, except during 1917 and 1918 (World War I), 1936 (financial issues), 1943 to 1945 (World War II), and 2020 and 2021 due to the COVID-19 pandemic.

The first solo Merced County Fair was held on September 14–15, 1929 at the Applegate Park Municipal Baseball Park. Early fairs hosted a rodeo and 4-H youth organization livestock shows. In 1931, the fair moved to its current site at 11th and G streets, now 900 Martin Luther King Jr. Way. In 1937, a parade and a three-day horse racing meeting was added to the fair. The fair closed in 1943 and did not open again till 1946 due to World War II. From 1946 to 2019 & since 2022, the fair has been run by the California Department of Food and Agriculture's 35th District Agricultural Association. The fairgrounds have been used year-round to support other community activities. On the fairgrounds have been the county library branch, a fire station, a school for the mentally handicapped, a preschool program, Merced College, the J. Emmett McNamara Memorial Museum, and Leontine Gracey Elementary School. The fairgrounds are also rented out during the year.

In 2020, the fair was scheduled for June 10–14, but was cancelled by the fair board due to "COVID-19 public health concerns." The 2021 fair, the 130th, was set for June 9–13, but it was again cancelled by the fair Board of Directors and CEO on March 8, 2021. Reasons given were the ongoing uncertainty of COVID-19 and restrictions on large public events. In 2021, the local economic benefit lost to the cancellation of the fair was around US$23 million.

The 130th fair finally resumed in 2022, from 8–12 June, following a pandemic-based hiatus.

== Merced Fairgrounds Speedway ==
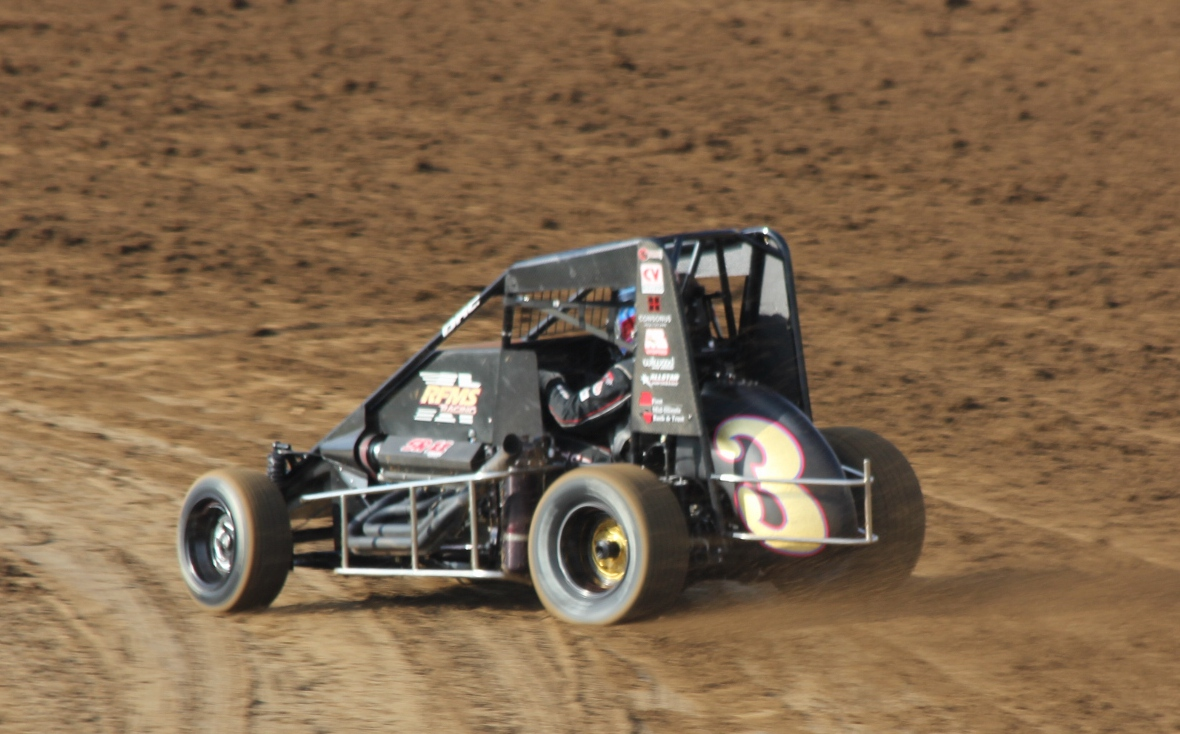
Chris Windom's midget car

When the fair is not meeting the race track is used for the Merced Fairgrounds Speedway. The speedway is a 0.375-mile dirt track that hosts race car, midget car and motorcycle racing. It previously held a race in NASCAR's premier division during the 1956 NASCAR Grand National Series. Chris Windom won the 2020 National Midget Car Championship at the Merced Fairgrounds Speedway.

== Camp Merced ==
After the surprise Japanese attack on Pearl Harbor on December 7, 1941, the Merced County Fairgrounds was turned into the Merced Assembly Center, a detention center for those of Japanese ancestry.

The center opened on May 6, 1942 and closed on September 15, 1942 detaining a total of 4,669 individuals of Japanese ancestry. Most of those detained were transferred to a permanent camp, Granada War Relocation Center in Colorado. President Franklin D. Roosevelt authorized the forced relocation of Japanese Americans living on the West Coast with Executive Order 9066 over the fear of more attacks. Notable people held at the Merced Assembly Center included artist Emiko Nakano. The former Merced Assembly Center is a California Historical Landmark, number 934.02.

After the Assembly Center closed, the fairgrounds were turned over to the 4th Air Service Area Command for supplies and training until 1945; during this time it was known as Camp Merced. For three years Camp Merced was used as the headquarters for and to support the Merced Army Air Field and its auxiliary fields that were used for training new pilots needed for World War II. The 802nd Chemical Company and 1914th Ordnance Ammunition Company, Aviation were also trained at Camp Merced before deployment to the Pacific War.

== See also ==
- California Historical Landmarks in Merced County
- California during World War II
