= Abiko =

Abiko may refer to:

== People ==
- Abiko (surname)

== Places ==
- Abiko, Chiba, city in Chiba Prefecture, Japan
- Abiko Station (Chiba), railway station in Abiko, Chiba Prefecture Japan
- Abiko Station (Osaka), railway station in Sumiyoshi-ku, Osaka, Japan
