= Esther Takei Nishio =

Japanese-American internee (1925–2019)

- Born: Esther Kazue Takei; February 15, 1925; Los Angeles, California, U.S.
- Died: October 1, 2019 (aged 94); Pasadena, California, U.S.
- Occupation: Secretary
- Known for: Japanese-American internee; first internee enrolled in a California college during World War II

Esther Takei Nishio (February 15, 1925 – October 1, 2019) was an American woman from California, incarcerated at the Granada War Relocation Center in Colorado during World War II. She was the first Japanese-American student to enroll in a California university after returning from camp, in 1944, when she was chosen as a test case for resettlement.

== Early life ==
Esther Kazue Takei was born in Los Angeles, California, the daughter of Shigehisa "Harry" Takei and Ninoe Takei. She was raised in Venice Beach, where her Japanese-born parents ran concession stands along the pier. At age 6, she was chosen to be a "mascot" for the Japanese team at the 1932 Summer Olympics held in Los Angeles.

== World War II ==
As a teenager, a senior at Venice High School, she was incarcerated with her family at Granada War Relocation Center in Granada, Colorado, from 1942 to 1944 following the signing of Executive Order 9066. "I thought, well, I guess, as a good American citizen, we have to do what the government wants us to do," she recalled many years later. She worked as a dental assistant in the internment camp, and drew a weekly cartoon, "Ama-Chan", for the camp newspaper, the Granada Pioneer. She also briefly worked as a live-in servant for a family in Boulder, Colorado.

In 1944, she was allowed to return to California and enroll in Pasadena Junior College, as a "test case" for Japanese-American resettlement after the war. During her time as a student, she lived with the family of Hugh Anderson, a Quaker accountant in Altadena. Her enrollment was greeted with threats and harassment from anti-Japanese nativists in the area; sympathetic students and others volunteered to walk with her on campus, for her safety. The War Relocation Authority's director, Dillon S. Myer, stood by the decision to allow Takei's enrollment. "Her ultimately successful resettlement helped pave the way for the mass return of Japanese Americans to the West Coast beginning in January 1945," noted one profile.

Takei left college without graduating, to help her parents re-establish themselves in Los Angeles; in 2010 Pasadena City College presented her with an honorary degree.

== After the war ==
Nishio worked as a secretary. Her parents moved to Japan in 1958. She testified before the 1981 Commission on Wartime Relocation and Internment of Civilians. In 1999 she gave an oral history interview to the Japanese American National Museum. She was named California Woman of the Year in 2012. That year, she spoke on a panel at the first Fred Korematsu Day event in Pasadena.

Esther Takei married a fellow Japanese-American internee, Shigeto Nishio, in 1947; they had a son, John. She died in 2019, aged 94 years, in Pasadena, California. There is a box of her papers, including letters, photographs, and her 1944 identification badge, at the Japanese American National Museum in Los Angeles.
