= Yamato Colony =

Yamato Colony can refer to some places in the United States:

- Yamato Colony, California, a Japanese-American agricultural community in Livingston, California
- Yamato Colony, Florida, an early 20th-century Japanese agricultural community between Boca Raton and Delray Beach
