= Ueyama =

Ueyama (written: 上山 lit. "upper mountain") is a Japanese surname. Notable people with the surname include:

- Koki Ueyama (上山 紘輝) (born 1999), Japanese sprinter
- Ryuki Ueyama (上山 龍紀) (born 1976), Japanese mixed martial artist
- Shunpei Ueyama (上山 春平) (1921–2012), Japanese philosopher
- Tomohiro Ueyama (上山 友裕) (born 1987), Japanese Paralympic archer
- Tokio Ueyama (上山 鳥城男) (1889–1954), Japanese painter
