= California Historical Landmarks in Merced County =

This list includes properties and districts listed on the California Historical Landmark listing in Merced County, California. Click the "Map of all coordinates" link to the right to view a Google map of all properties and districts with latitude and longitude coordinates in the table below.

Image		Landmark name	Location	City or town	Summary
Canal Farm Inn	548	Canal Farm Inn	1460 E. Pacheco Blvd. 37°03′26″N 120°49′56″W	Los Banos	
Los Banos	550	Los Banos	Los Banos Park, 803 E. Pacheco Blvd. 37°03′24″N 120°50′46″W	Los Banos	
Merced Assembly Center	934	Merced Assembly Center	Merced County Fairgrounds; 37°17′29″N 120°29′06″W	Merced	
Pacheco Pass	829	Pacheco Pass	Romero Overlook; 37°04′50″N 121°05′54″W	Los Banos	
Snelling Courthouse	409	Snelling Courthouse	Main St. 37°31′10″N 120°26′15″W	Snelling	

== See also ==
- List of California Historical Landmarks
- National Register of Historic Places listings in Merced County, California
