= Lily Yuriko Nakai Havey =

American water color artist and author

Lily Yuriko Nakai Havey is an American watercolor artist and author.

== Biography ==
Born in 1932, Havey is a Japanese American Nisei whose family was forced to Japanese American internment camps during World War II (following the signing of Executive Order 9066) when she was 10 years old. Her family first was sent to Santa Anita Assembly Center in Pasadena, California, and then to Amache Relocation Center (Granada Relocation Center).

Havey graduated from the New England Conservatory of Music. Havey then worked as an English teacher and later went on to establish a stained-glass studio. At age 65, she began painting.

Havey created and illustrated a memoir called Gasa Gasa Girl Goes to Camp, which was published in 2014. The memoir is about her family's experience through her narrative and artwork. The book focuses on her confusion and frustration resulting from her American identity and her Japanese ethnic background. "Why were we still pledging our allegiance to the United States? The government had classified us as evil Japanese and herded us in to this camp. Maybe we ought to be singing the Japanese anthem instead...Yes, I knew that anthem. My mother had taught it to me because, she claimed, "You are Japanese, Yuriko." "Japanese? No, I'm American," I insisted." She emphasized that camp experience was traumatic and affected her for the rest of her life.
