= Granada School =

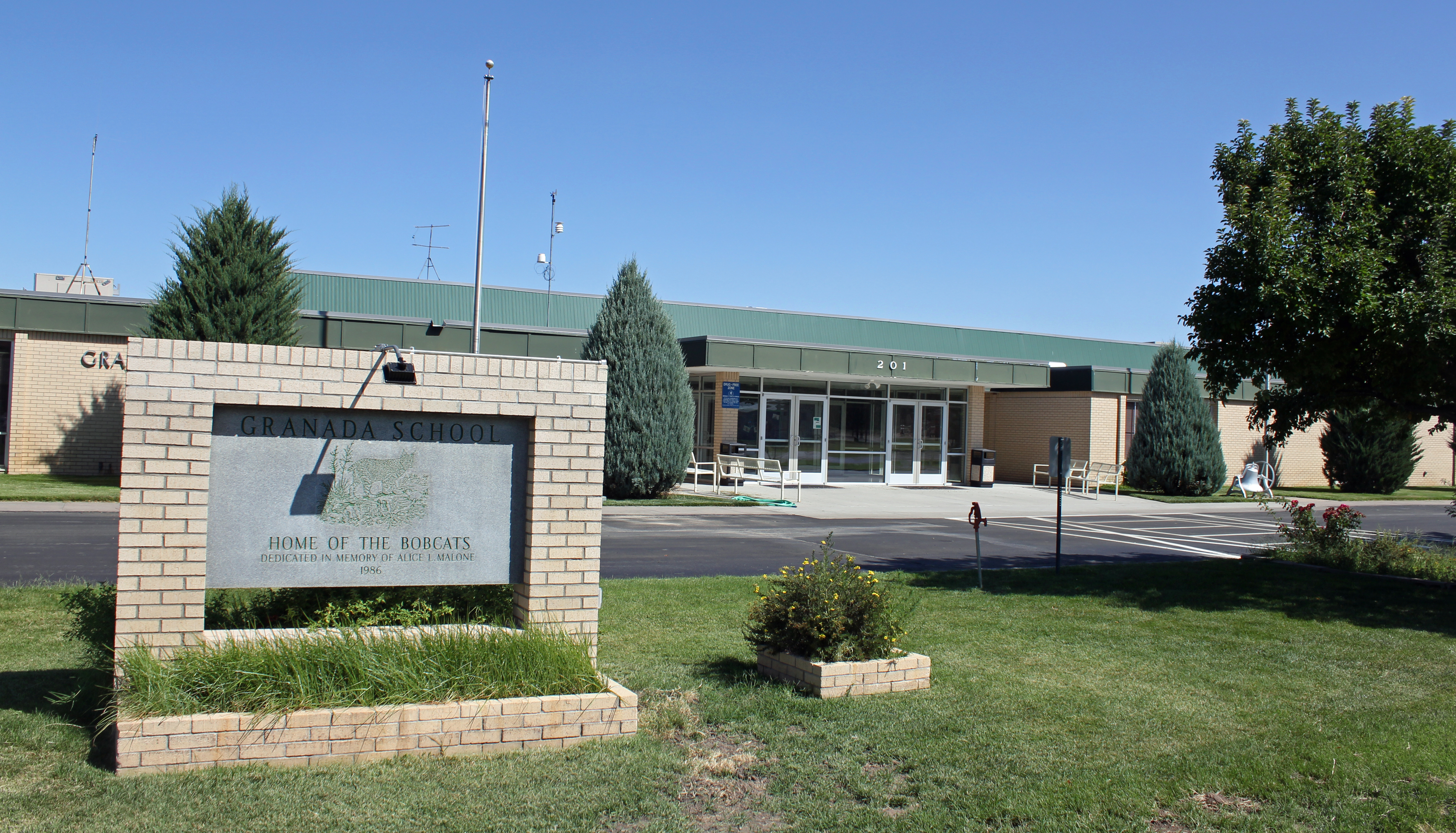
- Granada School in 2013

Location
- 201 South Hoisington Avenue; Granada, Colorado 81041; United States
- Coordinates: 38°03′35″N 102°18′20″W

Information
- School type: Public school
- School district: Granada RE-1
- CEEB code: 060680
- NCES School ID: 080429000592; 080429000593
- Superintendent: Ty Kemp
- Teaching staff: 19.37
- Grades: P–12
- Enrollment: 202 (2023–2024)
- Student to teacher ratio: 10.12
- Colors: Green and white
- Athletics conference: CHSAA
- Mascot: Bobcat
- Website: www.granadaschools.org

Granada School is a public school serving Granada, Colorado, United States. It is the only school in Granada School District RE-1.

As a school project, students have set up a museum with details about and artifacts from the Granada War Relocation Center. John Hopper, a history teacher at the school, started a program in the early 1990s to educate students about the Japanese American internment camp located near the community during World War II, gathering photos and interviewing those interned at the camps. Through the efforts of students and their Amache Preservation Society, the camp has been designated as a National Historic Landmark. Students from the school have traveled around the state, teaching other students about the internment camp.

== Athletics ==
The Granada Bobcats compete in the High Plains League of the Colorado High School Activities Association. The team colors are green and white.

Despite the school's extremely small enrollment, the school's sports teams have earned recognition as state champions in several sports administered by the Colorado High School Activities Association:

- Baseball: 1991 (1A-2A) and 1995 (2A)
- Boys' basketball: 1989 (A-II) and 1991 (1A)
- Girls' basketball: 1996 (1A)
- American football: 1979, 1988 and 2006 (A-8). The Granada Bobcats won the 2006 Class A 8-man football state championship in triple overtime with a 47–46 win against Stratton Senior High School, after three previous championship game losses against Stratton.
