= Granada War Relocation Center =

U.S. National Historic Site in Prowers County, Colorado

- Granada War Relocation Center; Amache National Historic Site
- U.S. National Register of Historic Places
- U.S. National Historic Landmark
- U.S. National Historic Site
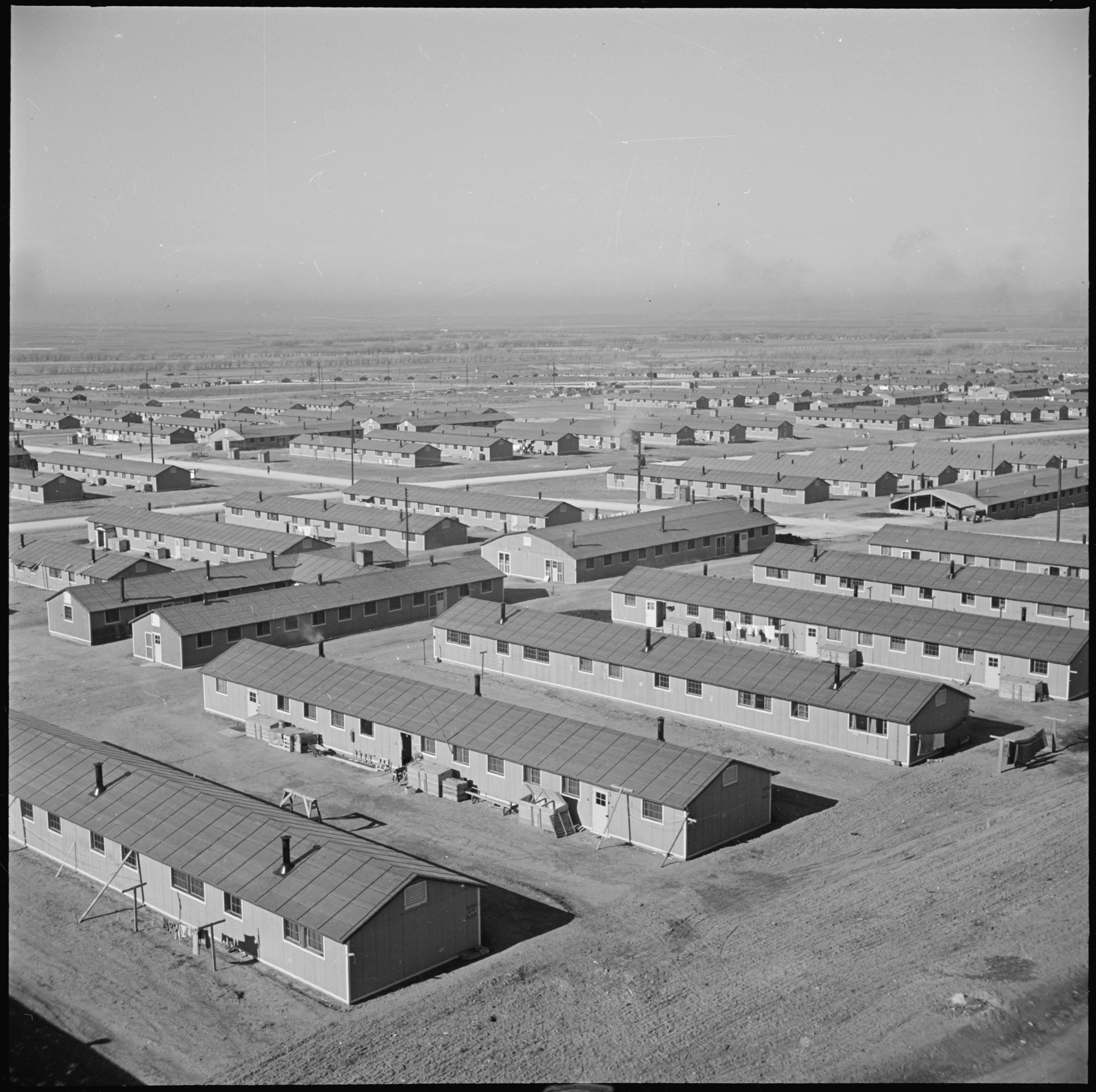
- A general view of a section of the site looking north and west.

- Location within the United States Location within Colorado
- Location: 23900 County Road FF, Granada, Colorado
- Coordinates: 38.04962°N 102.3286°W
- Built: 1942
- Architect: US Army Corps of Engineers; Lambie, Moss, Litle, and James
- Visitation: 8,113 (2025)
- Website: Amache National Historic Site
- NRHP reference No.: 94000425

Significant dates
- Added to NRHP: May 18, 1994
- Designated NHL: February 10, 2006
- Designated NHS: March 18, 2022

Granada War Relocation Center, known to the internees as Camp Amache (/ɑːmɑːtʃi/ ah-mah-chee) and later designated the Amache National Historic Site, was a concentration camp for Japanese Americans in Prowers County, Colorado. Following the Japanese attack on Pearl Harbor on December 7, 1941, Japanese Americans on the West Coast were rounded up and sent to remote camps.

The camp, located 1.3 miles (2.1 km) southwest of the small farming community of Granada, south of U.S. Highway 50, was listed on the National Register of Historic Places on May 18, 1994, and designated a National Historic Landmark on February 10, 2006. On March 18, 2022, U.S. President Joe Biden signed the Amache National Historic Site Act authorizing the Granada War Relocation Center to become part of the National Park System. It was formally established as part of the National Park Service on February 15, 2024, the third National Historic Site in Colorado after Bent's Old Fort and the site of the Sand Creek Massacre.

== History ==
Following the Japanese attack on Pearl Harbor on December 7, 1941, President Franklin D. Roosevelt authorized the forced relocation of Japanese Americans living on the West Coast with Executive Order 9066. Over the spring of 1942, some 120,000 Japanese Americans were moved into temporary assembly centers before being transferred to more permanent and isolated relocation centers like Granada. Run by the War Relocation Authority, the government body responsible for administration of the incarceration program, Granada was one of ten such camps, the only one to be built on private land. The camp site covered 10,000 acres (40 km^{2}), of which only 640 acres (2.6 km^{2}) was used for residential, community and administrative buildings, while the rest was devoted to agricultural projects. The land was owned by several ranchers and farmers before the war, and only one of these property owners willingly sold his acreage to make way for the camp, creating tension between the WRA and the other landholders, whose parcels were taken via condemnation. This did not necessarily translate to overall resistance to Japanese Americans being housed in the area: Colorado Governor Ralph Lawrence Carr was one of the few to welcome the Japanese Americans and the only governor not to oppose the establishment of a WRA camp in his state, going against the anti-Japanese sentiment of the times.

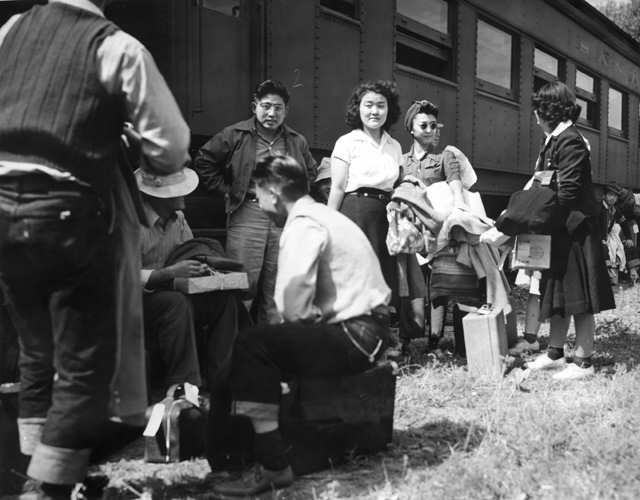
Japanese American evacuees stand or sit with their suitcases and belongings in front of an Atchison, Topeka and Santa Fe Railway passenger car on August 30, 1942. The men and women wait for the bus ride to Camp Amache, Granada Relocation Center, southeastern Colorado. U.S. War Relocation Authority photo

Granada opened August 27, 1942, and reached a peak population of 7,318 persons by February 1943, making it the smallest of the WRA camps (although the total number who passed through the camp during its three-year existence was over 10,000). Nearly all of the camp's original internees came from California: southwest Los Angeles, the Central Valley and the northern coast. Many had been residents of the Yamato Colony, a farming settlement established by Issei businessman Kyutaro Abiko.

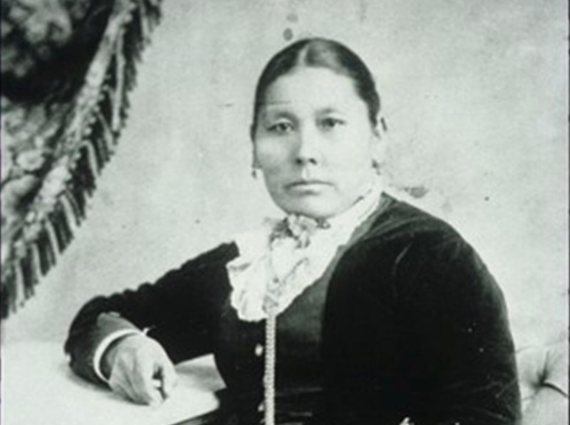
Amache Prowers, Cheyenne mediator, wife of John Wesley Prowers, late 19th century

The camp's unofficial name quickly became Camp Amache, named after a Cheyenne chief's daughter, Amache Prowers, the wife of John Wesley Prowers. (The county where Camp Amache is located is named after Prowers.)

The Camp Amache residential area is spread atop a low hill, which prevented the flooding and mud problems which plagued other WRA camps, although the area was prone to high winds and severe dust storms. It was surrounded by barbed-wire fencing, with eight machine-gun towers located all around the camp. However, all eight towers were rarely manned at one time, and the guns were never used. The Project Director, James G. Lindley, allowed internees to take day trips to the town of Granada, located within walking distance of the camp, and although some locals remained hostile to their "Jap" neighbors, most eventually warmed to the internees, with many business owners hiring Japanese Americans and stocking goods that catered to their Amache customers.

Although relations with the residents of Granada and other nearby communities were largely positive, many Coloradans protested the construction of Amache High School in 1943. The region was still recovering from the Depression of the 1930s, and citizens argued their tax dollars should not go to support Japanese American students. Echoing widespread rumors that the WRA was "coddling" confined Japanese Americans while the rest of the country suffered from wartime shortages, U.S. Senator Edwin C. Johnson called it an example of "pampering" the enemy. The high school was completed in June 1943, but plans to construct two additional schools for elementary and junior high students were abandoned; middle schoolers shared the Amache High building with older students, while elementary school classes continued in a barracks in Block 8H. There were several clubs, extracurricular activities, and social events that were available to students of all grade levels in Amanche High School.

Sources indicate that the high school football team lost one game in three years. One noteworthy event was when the Amache football team played the undefeated football team from Holly, Colorado, which is located just 11 miles (17.7 km) east of Amache on U.S. 50. This game was unique because Holly actually agreed to come up to the camp and play Amache on their home field. One of the Holly team players was Roy Romer, who went on to become Governor of Colorado. The Amache team won this game by a score of 7–0, the only touchdown coming from a trick play, thus the Amache team can claim to be undefeated on their own field.

Adults in camp had various opportunities for employment. The camp had a police department which was worked by sixty Japanese American internees, although it was headed by a white security officer. Similarly, the Amache Fire Department consisted of three crews of Japanese American firefighters and one internee fire chief working under white supervisors. Some (though not many) who had earned teaching credentials prior to their confinement were employed in the camp schools. A silkscreen shop was established in 1943, and its forty-five staff members created training materials and over 250,000 color posters for the U.S. Navy, in addition to calendars, program events and other personal-use items for camp residents. As in all the WRA camps, doctors, nurses, dentists, and other healthcare workers found work at the camp hospital, although they were paid significantly less than their white coworkers — and fellow internees often pooled money to subsidize their low wages.

Most of the work in Granada was directed at agricultural production. Like most of the other WRA camps, the land surrounding the residential areas were devoted to farming and raising livestock. The WRA budget restricted the per-inmate food allotment to 45 cents a day, partly to avoid the complaints of coddling and partly because the camp was intended to be mostly self-sufficient in its food production. These efforts proved especially successful at Granada, where internee laborers produced enough to feed the entire camp population and send the surplus to the U.S. Army and other camps. (In 1943, for example, Granada farmers grew 4 million pounds of vegetables.)

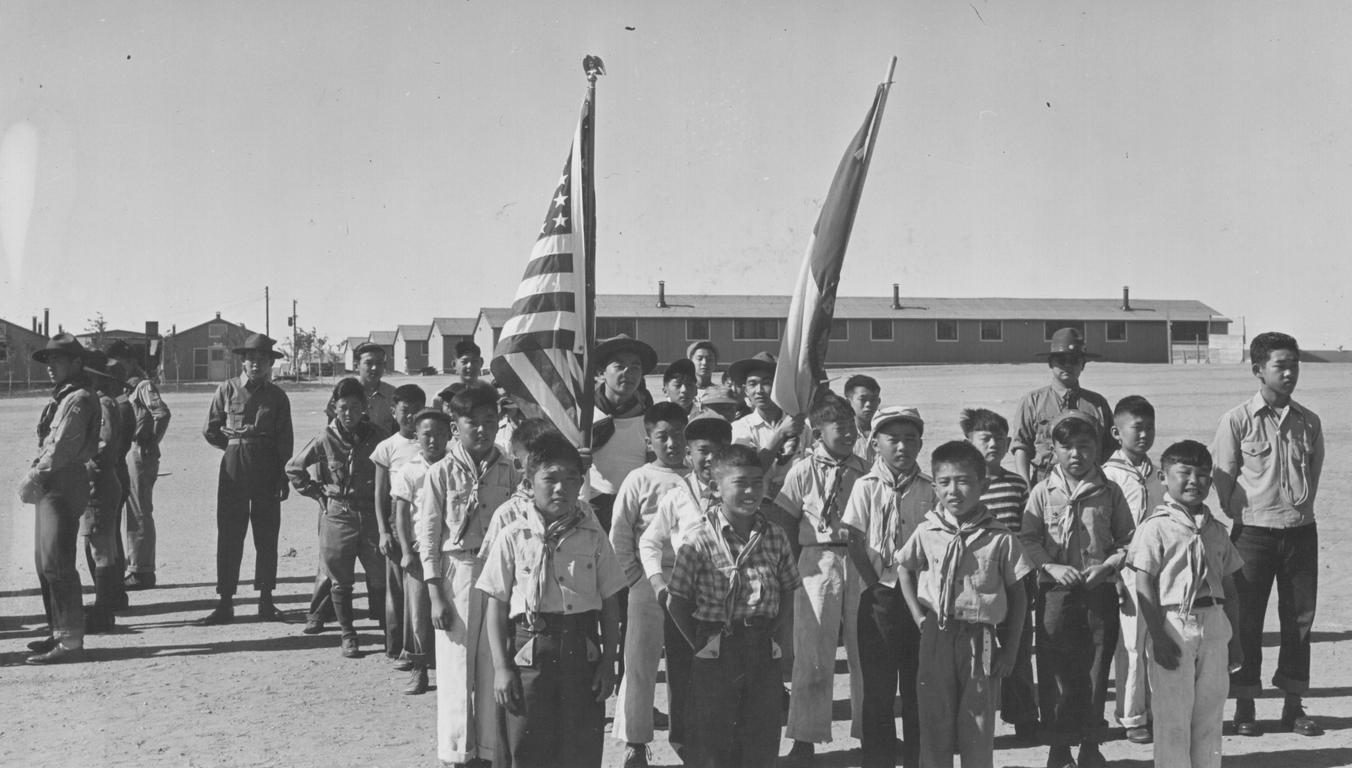
Boy Scout Memorial Day parade at the Granada War Relocation Center, Amache, Colorado, 1943.

Internee leaders set up a separate Amache District for Boy Scouts at the camp. These Scouts still flew the American flag as seen in the photograph at right of a Boy Scout Memorial Day parade at the camp.

In June 1942, the War Department authorized the formation of the 100th Infantry Battalion consisting of 1,432 men of Japanese descent in the Hawaii National Guard and sent them to Camps McCoy and Shelby for advanced training. Because of its superior training record, the Army's previous restrictions against Nisei (listed as enemy aliens ineligible for active service after Pearl Harbor) were lifted in order to create the 442nd RCT in January 1943 when 10,000 men from Hawaii signed up with eventually 2,686 being chosen along with 1,500 from the mainland. The 100th Infantry Battalion entered combat in September 1943 and it became known as the Purple Heart Battalion because of their heroism and horrific casualties. It was joined by the 442nd RCT in June 1944 and together it lived up to the motto "Go For Broke" because of the degree to which its soldiers risked their lives in battle and became the most highly decorated unit in the war and to this day, for its size and length of service. Eventually, 441 Nisei joined the U.S. Army from this camp, either volunteering or accepting their conscription into the famed 100th/442nd and MIS. In the southwest corner of the camp is a small cemetery and memorial dedicated to the Japanese Americans from there who volunteered to fight in Europe in World War II. A large stone memorial with 31 men's names engraved in it sits in the cemetery in memory of those soldiers from Amache who died defending the U.S.

== Preservation and designation ==
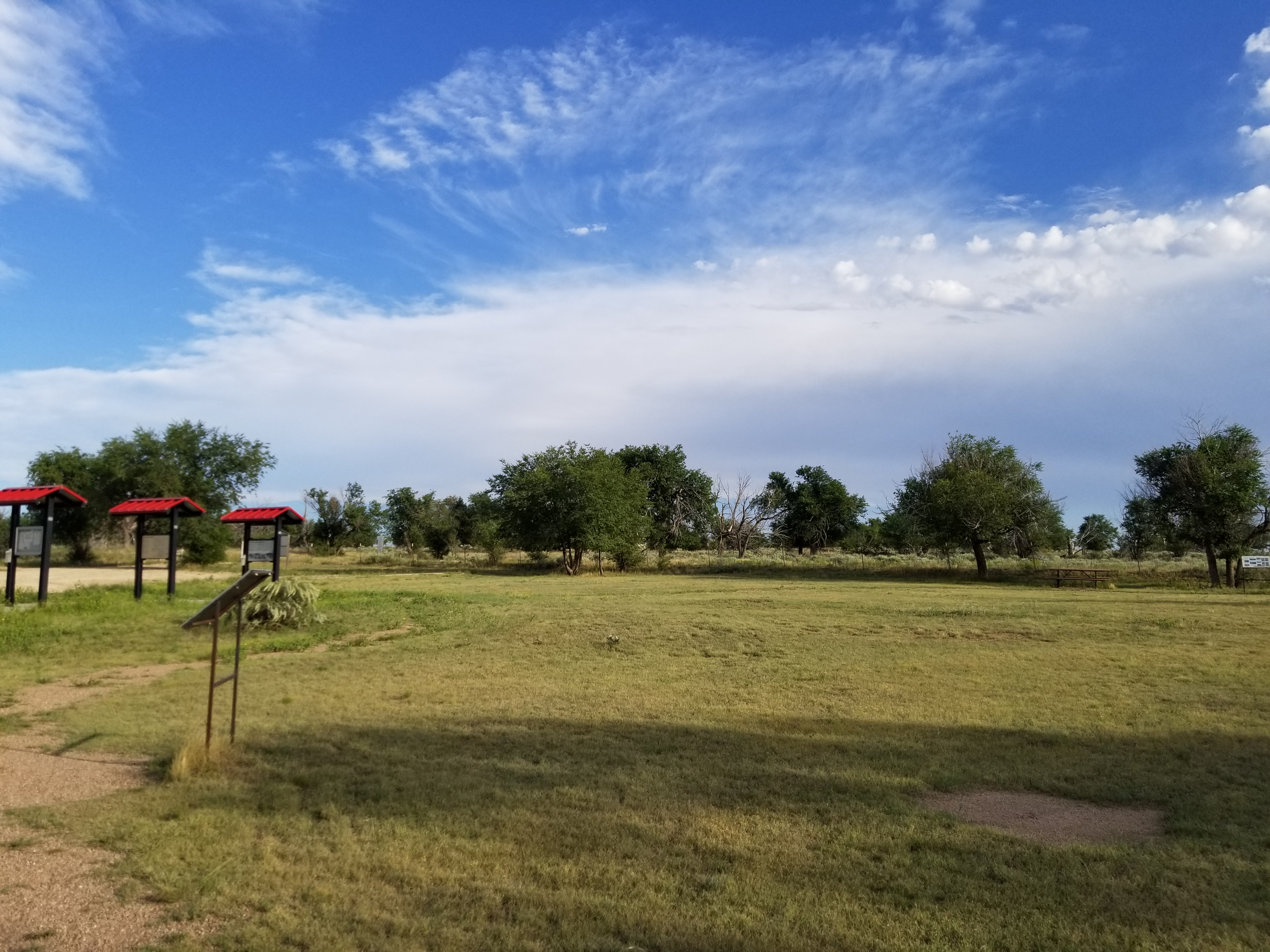
Granada War Relocation Center as seen in August 2019. Interpretive signs are visible.

Since 1990, the Amache Preservation Society, a Granada high school group, has worked on preservation of the site and its documents. As a school project, Granada Undivided High School students have set up a museum for the Granada War Relocation Center.

On December 21, 2006, President George W. Bush signed H.R. 1492 into law guaranteeing $38,000,000 in federal money to restore the Granada relocation center and nine other former Japanese American internment camps. Granada Relocation Center National Historic Site Acts were introduced in 2006 and 2007 by Colorado Sen. Wayne Allard but got no traction.

In April 2021, Colorado U.S. Representatives Ken Buck and Joe Neguse introduced the Amache National Historic Site Act (HR 2497). President Joe Biden signed the act into law on March 18, 2022, authorizing the site to become part of the National Park Service pending acquisition of property. The NPS completed a Special Resource Study on the site in October 2022.

== Notable internees ==
- Kaneji Domoto (1913–2002), an architect and landscape architect
- Toichi Domoto (1902–2001), nurseryman, noted horticulturist (camellias)
- Yuriko Domoto (1915–2004), a social worker
- Robert S. Hamada (born 1937), the Edward Eagle Brown Distinguished Service Professor of Finance and former Dean of the University of Chicago Graduate School of Business
- Mike Honda (born 1941), an American politician
- Lawson Fusao Inada (born 1938), an American poet. Also interned at Jerome
- Joseph Ishikawa (1919–2017), an art museum director at Michigan State University, and community activist
- Yasuhiro Ishimoto (1921–2012), an influential photographer
- Kiyoshi K. Muranaga (1922–1944), a United States Army soldier and a recipient of the Medal of Honor
- Yuriko Nakai (born 1932), watercolor artist and author
- Emiko Nakano (1925–1990), abstract expressionist painter, printmaker
- Walter Oi (1929–2013), the Elmer B. Milliman Professor of Economics at the University of Rochester and fellow of the American Academy of Arts and Sciences.
- Arthur Okamura (1932–2009), a screen print artist
- Chiyoko Sakamoto (1912–1994), California's first Japanese American female lawyer
- Sab Shimono (born 1937), an actor. Also interned at Tule Lake.
- Mari Yoriko Sabusawa (1920–1994), a translator, activist, and philanthropist
- Pat Suzuki (born 1930), a popular singer and actress
- Esther Takei Nishio (1925–2019), "test case" as the first internee to return and enroll in a California university in 1944
- Tetsuo Toyama (1883–1971), Japanese journalist. Also interned at Jerome War Relocation Center
- Tokio Ueyama (1889–1954), painter
- Edison Uno (1929–1976), a Japanese American civil rights advocate. Also interned at the Crystal City Internment Camp.
- Ruth Taiko Watanabe (1916–2005), a music librarian
- George Yuzawa (1915–2011), a community activist

== In popular culture ==
- Author Sandra Dallas uses Granada as the basis of her fictional work Tallgrass.
- Lily Yuriko Nakai Havey, an internee at Amache, published a memoir of her time in the camp, Gasa Gasa Girl Goes to Camp, in 2014.
- Camp Amache figures in Ann Howard Creel's novel The Magic of Ordinary Days as the place where two important minor characters live.

== See also ==
- Bibliography of the Japanese American Internment during World War II
- Outline of Japanese American Internment during World War II
- Densho: The Japanese American Legacy Project
- Gila River War Relocation Center
- Heart Mountain War Relocation Center
- Jerome War Relocation Center
- Manzanar National Historic Site
- Minidoka National Historic Site
- Poston War Relocation Center
- Rohwer War Relocation Center
- Topaz War Relocation Center
- Tule Lake War Relocation Center

== Sources ==
- Harvey, Robert. Amache: The Story of Japanese Internment in Colorado during World War II. Dallas: Taylor Trade Publishing, 2003.
- Johnson, Melyn. "At Home in Amache." Colorado Heritage (1989): 2–10.
- Turkewitz, Julie. "Revisiting a World War II Internment Camp, as Others Try to Keep Its Story From Fading". New York Times, MAY 17, 2015, Revisiting a World War II Internment Camp, as Others Try to Keep Its Story From Fading
