= Robert Hamada (professor) =

Robert Hamada is the former Edward Eagle Brown Distinguished Service Professor of Finance and former Dean of the University of Chicago Booth School of Business.

== Early life ==
A third-generation Japanese American, Hamada was born in San Francisco, California to Kenjiro and Umeko (née Funai) Hamada in 1937. He and his family were sent to the Amache internment camp during World War II due to Executive Order 9066. Following their release, the Hamada family moved to New York.

Hamada received his B.S. in chemical engineering from Yale University and his S.M. industrial management, and Ph.D. Finance, in 1959, 1961, and 1969 respectively from the MIT Sloan School of Management.

== See also ==
- Hamada's equation
