= Emiko Nakano =

American artist (1925–1990)

- Born: July 4, 1925; Sacramento, California, U.S.
- Died: March 7, 1990 (aged 64); Richmond, California, U.S.
- Education: San Francisco Art Institute, University of California, Berkeley, Mills College
- Occupations: painter, printmaker, fiber artist, fashion Illustrator
- Years active: 1947 to 1960
- Movement: Abstract expressionism

Emiko Nakano (1925–1990) was an American abstract expressionist painter, printmaker, fiber artist, and fashion Illustrator.

== Biography ==
Emiko Nakano was born on July 4, 1925, in Sacramento, California; her parents were immigrants from Japan. She was raised in Chico, California. When Nakano was in high school in 1939, the United States entered World War II. Following the signing of Executive Order 9066, her family was placed internment camp for three years because they were of Japanese ancestry; first at the Merced Assembly Center, followed by Camp Amache. When they were released from the camps, the family moved to Richmond, California.

From fall 1947 until the summer of 1951, Nakano attended the California School of Fine Arts (now known as San Francisco Art Institute). She studied with Clyfford Still, James Budd Dixon, Edward Corbett, Richard Diebenkorn, Hassel Smith, and Elmer Bischoff. In summer 1949, she attended the University of California, Berkeley; and in the summer 1952, she attended Mills College.

In the 1950s, Nakano worked as a freelance fashion illustrator. She died on March 7, 1990, at the age of 64, in Richmond, California. Her work is in the public museum collection at the Monterey Museum of Art. In 2016 her biography was included in the exhibition catalogue Women of Abstract Expressionism organized by the Denver Art Museum. In 2023 her work was included in the exhibition Action, Gesture, Paint: Women Artists and Global Abstraction 1940-1970 at the Whitechapel Gallery in London.

== Career ==
Nakano was a Fiber Artist. She used fibers from Japanese paper, which is a traditional Japanese technique called Shifu. The Inspiration for her technique of using the Japanese paper in the artistry was that in her early start to her career, she would see clothes made out of old account books. In her way, she would use calligraphy paper as her weft. Calligraphy Paper was used by her because when the paper was cut and woven, the calligraphy character looked like fragments of ancient Japanese markings. An Important part of Nakano artist abilities was using Words and language with her artistic work. In turn, because used words and language in artistry, she would add additional words to the layers of calligraphy paper, which caused words to become unreadable even to the people in Japan. Nakano used Japanese materials; she was also known to use natural processes in her work as well. She would put the paper in hot water to allow them to become organic and fluid, until they shrunk. The process that she used was a very non-controllable transformation, she allows her to have textural pieces of her work, it also creates a timeless element to her work and also evokes the passages of history.

== Exhibitions ==
A select list of exhibitions, by Nakano:

=== Solo exhibitions ===
- 2014–2015: Cross the Bridge: Emiko Nakano – Abstract Landscapes, Monterey Museum of Art, Monterey, California

=== Group exhibitions ===
- 1952: San Francisco Women Artists Annual Exhibition, San Francisco Museum of Art (now known as San Francisco Museum of Modern Art), San Francisco, California
- 1952: American Drawings, Watercolors, and Prints, the Metropolitan Museum of Art, New York City, New York
- 1955: São Paulo Art Biennial, São Paulo, Brazil
- 1955: Emiko Nakano and Clayton Pinkerton, Richmond Art Center, Richmond, California
- 1955: Bay Region Painting and Sculpture, San Francisco Museum of Art (now known as San Francisco Museum of Modern Art), San Francisco, California
