= Granada, Colorado =

Town in Colorado, United States

- Statutory Town
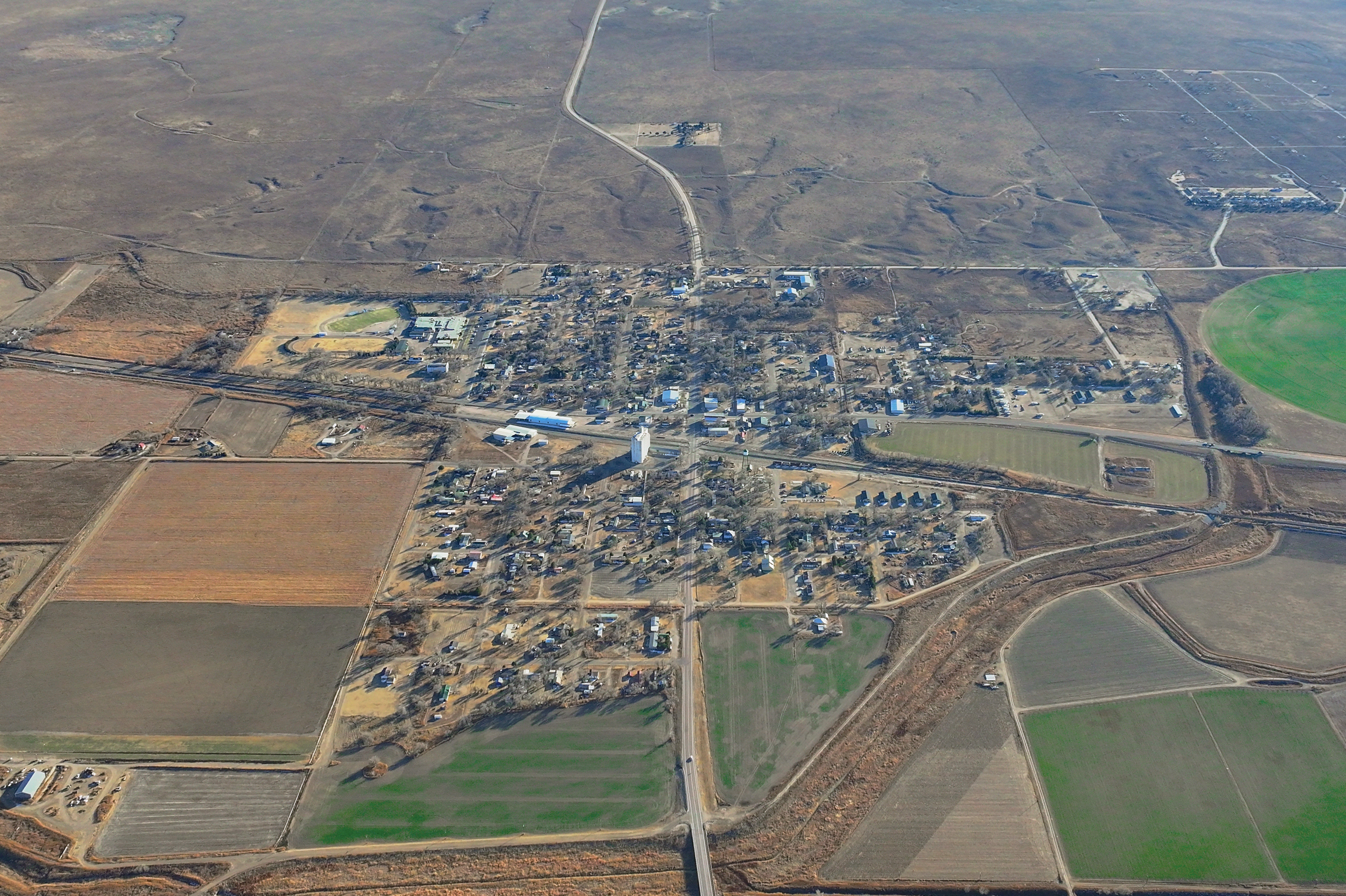
- Aerial view (2023)

- Location with Prowers County and Colorado
- Coordinates: 38°3′46.7″N 102°18′41.73″W
- Country: United States
- State: Colorado
- County: Prowers
- Incorporated: July 25, 1887

Area
  - Total: 0.685 sq mi (1.775 km^{2})
  - Land: 0.685 sq mi (1.775 km^{2})
  - Water: 0 sq mi (0 km^{2})
- Elevation: 3,484 ft (1,062 m)

Population (2020)
  - Total: 445
  - Density: 649/sq mi (251/km^{2})
- Time zone: UTC−7 (MST)
  - Summer (DST): UTC−6 (MDT)
- ZIP Code: 81041
- Area code: 719
- FIPS code: 08-31550
- GNIS ID: 2412698
- Website: Town Website

Granada is a statutory town in Prowers County, Colorado, United States. The town population was 445 at the 2020 United States census.

== History ==
A post office called Granada has been in operation since 1873. The community most likely takes its name from nearby Granada Creek.

During World War II, the Granada War Relocation Center (known to internees as Camp Amache) was located west of Granada as a Japanese American internment camp. It opened in August 1942 and housed a maximum population of 7,318 citizens.

== Geography ==
At the 2020 United States census, the town had a total area of 439 acres (1.775 km^{2}), all of it land.

== Demographics ==
Historical population
Census	Pop.	Note	%±
1880	121		—
1890	163		34.7%
1900	204		25.2%
1910	359		76.0%
1920	308		−14.2%
1930	352		14.3%
1940	342		−2.8%
1950	551		61.1%
1960	593		7.6%
1970	551		−7.1%
1980	557		1.1%
1990	513		−7.9%
2000	640		24.8%
2010	517		−19.2%
2020	445		−13.9%
U.S. Decennial Census

As of the census of 2000, there were 640 people, 198 households, and 151 families residing in the town. The population density was 889.6 inhabitants per square mile (343.5/km^{2}). There were 233 housing units at an average density of 323.9 per square mile (125.1/km^{2}). The racial makeup of the town was 64.69% White, 0.16% Native American, 33.75% from other races, and 1.41% from two or more races. Hispanic or Latino of any race were 62.50% of the population.

There were 198 households, out of which 48.5% had children under the age of 18 living with them, 61.1% were married couples living together, 9.6% had a female householder with no husband present, and 23.7% were non-families. 18.2% of all households were made up of individuals, and 11.6% had someone living alone who was 65 years of age or older. The average household size was 3.23 and the average family size was 3.77.

In the town, the population was spread out, with 37.7% under the age of 18, 9.1% from 18 to 24, 25.3% from 25 to 44, 18.3% from 45 to 64, and 9.7% who were 65 years of age or older. The median age was 28 years. For every 100 females, there were 95.1 males. For every 100 females age 18 and over, there were 100.5 males.

The median income for a household in the town was $26,042, and the median income for a family was $31,750. Males had a median income of $22,167 versus $18,750 for females. The per capita income for the town was $10,561. About 25.2% of families and 27.8% of the population were below the poverty line, including 34.4% of those under age 18 and 17.5% of those age 65 or over.

== Education ==
Students are served by Granada Undivided High School whose mascot are the Bobcats.

== See also ==
- National Old Trails Road
- Santa Fe National Historic Trail
