= Abiko (surname) =

Abiko (written: 安彦, 安孫子 or 我孫子) is a Japanese surname. Notable people with the surname include:

- Kyutaro Abiko (我孫子 久太郎, 1865–1936), Japanese-born American businessman
- Mitsuhiro Abiko (安孫子 充裕, born 1988), Japanese sprinter
- Motoo Abiko (安孫子 素雄, born 1934), Japanese manga artist. His pen name is Fujiko Fujio A.
- Takamasa Abiko (安彦 考真, born 1978), Japanese footballer
- Tomomi Abiko (我孫子 智美, born 1988), Japanese pole vaulter
