= Kaneji Domoto =

American architect

Kaneji "Kan" Domoto (堂本 兼次, Dōmoto Kaneji, November 5, 1912 - January 27, 2002), was an American architect and landscape architect.

== Biography ==
Kaneji Domoto was born in Oakland, California, on November 5, 1912, to Kanetaro ("Tom") and Teru Morita Domoto as the eighth of 11 children. He attended Stanford University and University of California, Berkeley. He was forcibly interned at the Granada War Relocation Center during World War II following the signing of Executive Order 9066. He studied with Frank Lloyd Wright in Taliesin and had a 50+ year career. Kan's career in architecture and landscape design spanned over 50 years, and included both residential and commercial projects. He received many awards for his Japanese-American gardens including the Frederick Law Olmsted Award for his Jackson Park design. He also published a book on bonsai.

Following the death of his first wife, Sally, who died in 1978, and in 1992 he married cookbook author Sylvia Schur. Domoto died January 27, 2002, at the age of 89. In addition to his 4 children, at his time of death, he had 3 stepchildren, 6 grandchildren, 1 great granddaughter, 2 sisters, and numerous nieces and nephews.

== Publications ==
Domoto co-authored Bonsai and the Japanese garden (1974; ISBN 0-88453-013-2) with George Kay.
