= Cortez, California =

Unincorporated community in California, United States

Cortez
- Unincorporated community
- Location in California Cortez (the United States)
- Coordinates: 37°28′31″N 120°44′23″W
- Country: United States
- State: California
- County: Merced
- Elevation: 141 ft (43 m)
- GNIS feature ID: 1655926

Cortez is an unincorporated community in Merced County, California, United States. It is located on the Atchison, Topeka and Santa Fe Railroad, 11.5 miles (19 km) northwest of Atwater, at an elevation of 141 feet (43 m).

== History ==
Some of California's early agricultural colonies owe their birth to the idealism of Abiko Kyutaro. Born in Niigata Prefecture Japan in 1865, he was raised by his grandfather in less than favorable economic conditions. At seventeen he moved to Tokyo with hopes jumping on a ship to America, but he ended up working there for a few years instead. During this time he became devout Christian and then came to America as a student in 1885, like several other initial Japanese immigrants. A decade later, Abiko became somewhat of a successful businessman and began his personal mission to aid other fellow Japanese in settling in the United States. In 1899, his newspaper, titled Nichibei Shimbun, became the most prominent Japanese newspaper. The paper took on issues such as restrictions on Japanese immigration and education discrimination. Abiko’s paper not only helped publicize issues important to Japanese Americans, but also created ties among newly formed Japanese communities. As Abiko became a prominent leader in the Japanese American community, he formed three new colonies: Yamato Colony in Livingston in 1907, Cressey in 1918, and Cortez in 1919.

== Legal loopholes ==
By the time Cortez was founded in 1919, another piece (in a long history) of anti-Japanese legislation had been passed in the United States. The Alien Land Law of 1913 prevented all ‘aliens illegible for citizenship’ from owning land or leasing property for more than three years. This act was a direct attempt to prevent Japanese farmers from owning land and therefore accumulating wealth in their names. Options for social mobility became limited. The farmers of the Abiko colonies were fortunate compared to many other Japanese; they were farm owners in addition to being farm laborers. In order to circumvent this law, many Japanese put their farm’s land in the name of their Nisei American born children. Families were able to turn barren uncultivated land into thriving farms through hard work ethic and by running a family economy. It was normal for all members of a family, including children, to work on the farm.
