= Granada Creek =

Stream in Colorado, U.S.

Coordinates: 38°02′43″N 102°15′45″W

Granada Creek is a stream in the U.S. state of Colorado.

Granada is a name derived from Spanish meaning "end of the road".

== See also ==
- List of rivers of Colorado
