= Tokio Ueyama =

Japanese-born painter (1889–1954)

- Born: 1889; Wakayama, Japan
- Died: 1954 (aged 64–65)
- Occupation: Artist

Tokio Ueyama (1889–1954) was a Japanese-born painter best known for his landscapes, still lifes, and portraits.

== Early life ==
He was born in 1889 in Wakayama, Japan, and immigrated to the United States in 1908 when he was 18 years old. He went on to study fine art at the University of Southern California and the Pennsylvania Academy of Fine Arts. He later settled in Los Angeles, California.

Following the bombing of Pearl Harbor, he was incarcerated with his wife Suye at the Granada Relocation Center (today's Amache National Historic Site) in southeast Colorado. While there, he taught adult art classes. When they returned to Los Angeles in the summer of 1945, they opened a gift shop called Bunkado, which continues to operate in Little Tokyo.

== Death ==
Ueyama died in 1954. His work is in the collections of the Japanese American National Museum in Los Angeles, California. His papers are in the Archives of American Art in Washington, DC.
