= Yamato Colony, California =

Japanese farming community in US

Coordinates: 37.4007°N 120.6957°W

Yamato Colony was a Japanese agricultural community in Livingston, California, United States. The Japanese farmers were instrumental in founding the Livingston Farmers Association.

The Yamato Colony was established by Kyutaro Abiko, who purchased 3,200 acres (13 km^{2}) in Livingston through his American Land and Produce Company, and then encouraged Japanese farmers from Wakayama and Chiba prefectures to settle there. Most of the settlers from Chiba eventually left the colony. Abiko sold the land to the farmers in 40-acre (16 ha) plots for $35 per acre. He arranged for a Japanese bank he was associated with to provide five-year loans for the purchase of the farms. Abiko is reported to have intended the colony to be a "Japanese Christian utopian colony", free of the gambling and dissolution that some of his recruits were involved with in Japan. While the colony was not advertised as "Christian", most of the settlers did become Christian.

The first settler arrived in 1906, and by 1908 the community had grown to a population of 30. The settlers originally planted peach trees and grape vines. One resident planted a crop of eggplants that sold well in San Francisco, and other settlers began raising vegetables, including sweet potatoes, asparagus, tomatoes and melons, which provided incomes while waiting for the trees and vines to mature. The Japanese settlers made an effort to fit in with the existing community by confining their economic activities to farming and patronizing European-American merchants. The new community had to overcome wind and water supply problems. The bank Abiko had recruited to finance the settlers failed, creating financial problems for the colony. A food buying cooperative was founded in 1910. The colony began to prosper with the formation of the Livingston Cooperative Society, a marketing cooperative, in 1914. A packing shed and a Methodist church were built in 1917. In 1927, the marketing cooperative split into the Livingston Fruit Growers Association and the Livingston Fruit Exchange. There were a reported 69 Japanese families in the Yamato Colony in 1940, farming more than 3,700 acres (1,500 ha).

At the beginning of World War II, in anticipation of internment, most of the residents of Yamato and two other colonies established by Abiko, Cressey, and Cortez, formed a corporation headed by a European-American to hold their property. As a result, the Japanese residents of Yamato were able to reclaim their property after the war. The two cooperatives were reunited in 1956 as the Livingston Farmers' Association. The members of the association began replacing peach trees and grape vines with almond trees, and by 1976 the majority of the acreage held by members of the association was in almonds. As of 2004, 57 of the 65 members of the association were Nisei.

Most of the original area of the colony is now part of the city of Livingston. Yamato Colony Elementary, operated by the Livingston Union School District, was opened in 1990.

== See also ==
- Yamato Colony, Florida
