= Kyutaro Abiko =

Japanese-born American businessman

Kyutaro Abiko (安孫子 久太郎, Abiko Kyūtarō; 1865–1936) was a Japanese-born American businessman and newspaper editor.

== Childhood ==
Abiko was born in 1865 in Suibara, Niigata prefecture, Japan. He was raised by his maternal grandparents after the death of his mother. He worked as a youngster in the family business, being tasked with selling candles and paper in villages close to his home. At age 17, Abiko travelled with several friends to Tokyo, where he settled and worked. Abiko intended to move to the US, so he enrolled in English classes. He converted to Christianity in 1883. Sponsored by the Fukuinkai (Gospel Society), he emigrated to the United States in 1885.

== Arrival in the United States ==
He arrived in San Francisco with only $1 in his hands in 1885. He obtained employment in a private home doing domestic chores, and began attending Lincoln Grammar School. After his graduation from Lincoln Grammar School, he attended the University of California at Berkeley. After his graduation, he used his savings to start a laundry business. Soon afterwards, he established a restaurant. Both businesses made only a modest profit. In 1897, he bought the Soko Nihon Shinbun, a Japanese language newspaper business.

During this time he also became a leader among Japanese Christian immigrants in the Bay Area, helping to establish San Francisco's first Japanese Methodist Episcopal church, organizing the San Francisco Christian Federation, and eventually becoming president of the Fukuinkai. After the 1906 earthquake, Abiko led relief efforts aimed at Japanese immigrants. He also played an active role in protesting the Gentlemen's Agreement of 1907, which placed heavy restrictions on further Japanese immigration.

== Nichibei Shimbun ==
In 1899, the Soko Nihon Shinbun (San Francisco Japanese News) merged with a second Japanese language newspaper, the Hokubei Nippo (North American Daily), to form the Nichibei Shimbun. By 1910, the Nichibei was the leading Japanese paper in the area, and by the 1920s it had San Francisco and Los Angeles editions and was read by some 25,000 households across the Western United States. Continuing his advocacy work in the Japanese immigrant community, Abiko used the paper to editorialize in favor of "morality education" for migrant laborers, encouraging them to settle permanently in the United States and establish families in their new homeland.

Abiko continued to run the Nichibei until his death in 1936, after which his widow, Yona, took over. The paper continued to enjoy success among its target readership until it was forced to close in 1942, due to the internment of Japanese Americans.

== Yamato Colony ==
Abiko believed that the future of the Japanese community in California lay in establishing farming communities. In 1904, he purchased 3,000 acres (12 km^{2}) of land in Livingston, Merced County, and founded the Yamato Colony. He began advertising, in Japanese language newspapers such as his own Nichibei Shimbun and the Shin Sekai, for Japanese immigrants to settle there, dividing the land into 40-acre plots and selling at $35 per acre.

The first settler to arrive was Tajiro Kishi, who arrived in November 1906. Within two years, a total of thirty settlers had arrived. The first crops planted were peach trees and grape vines. Both crops required three to five years of growth before substantial harvests could be conducted. In the interim, eggplants, sweet potatoes, asparagus, tomatoes and melons were grown to provide some income, but the period from 1910 - 1915 was known as Hihei jidai, the Period of Impoverishment.

A food buying co-operative was established in 1910, and a marketing co-operative was established to sell produce in 1914. The settlers avoided establishing any businesses apart from farms. It was believed that avoiding direct business competition with white-owned businesses in their neighboring settlements, racial hostilities could be minimized.

A Christian church was built in the community in 1917. Although Abiko was a Christian, the Yamato colony was not designed to be Christian. However, unlike most Japanese communities in the United States, no Buddhist temple was ever built, and those colonists who were not Christians converted over time.

Abiko also established Japanese farming colonies at Cressey and Cortez, in California.
