= La Monarca Bakery =

Mexican bakery-cafe in Los Angeles

La Monarca Bakery is a Mexican bakery-cafe that operates twelve retail locations in Los Angeles, California, United States.

== History ==
The company was founded in 2006 by Ricardo Cervantes and Alfredo Livas, opening its first bakery in the city of Huntington Park, within the historic Pacific Boulevard commercial district. In 2009, the company opened its second location in City of Commerce, CA. and in 2010 opened its third location in Santa Monica. In 2012, La Monarca Bakery opened its fourth store in South Pasadena, CA. In 2013, La Monarca Bakery opened its fifth store in Hollywood in January, 2014, and its sixth store in Boyle Heights. Its seventh location opened in Highland Park in 2015. The eighth location opened in Whittier, California in 2016. In 2017 the company opened its ninth location in Pico Rivera, California, its 10th store in Cesar Chavez and its 11th location on Western and Santa Monica Blvd in Hollywood. The most recent La Monarca Bakery location opened in 2018 in Lincoln Heights.

La Monarca Bakery makes traditional Mexican pan dulce and sells Mexican coffee sourced from Oaxaca, Mexico. They brew traditional Cafe de Olla, a Mexican coffee drink.

La Monarca Bakery has also been profiled in Forbes, in their 5th Annual "Small Giants" piece and The Los Angeles Times in their 2017 Guide to Best Bakeries in LA. La Monarca Bakery's Highland Park grand opening in 2015 was keynoted by California State Senate President Pro Tempore Kevin De Leon.

== Fare ==
La Monarca Bakery offers Mexican pan dulce, cookies and cakes. La Monarca Bakery's coffee and espresso drinks are made utilizing La Marzocco equipment. La Monarca serves Mexican savory and sweet fare.

== Founders ==
La Monarca Bakery was founded by Monterrey, Mexico natives Ricardo Cervantes and Alfredo Livas after completing their MBA studies at Stanford University's Graduate School of Business.
