= Warner Grand Theatre =

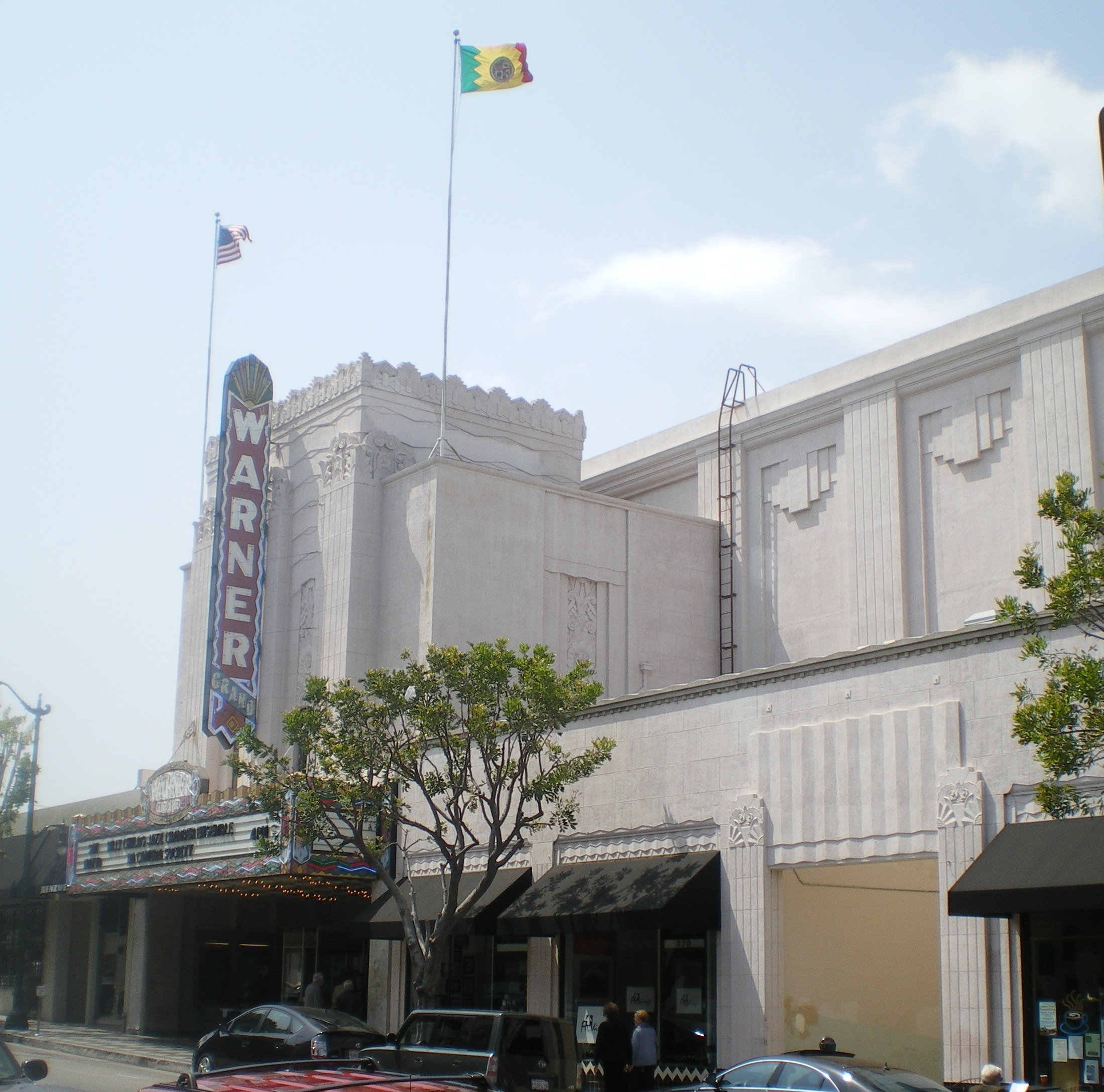
- Warner Grand Theater, 2008
- Interactive map of Warner Grand Theatre
- Former names: Warner Bros. Theatre; San Pedro Theatre; Teatro Juarez
- Address: 478 W. 6th St. San Pedro, Los Angeles, California; United States
- Owner: City of Los Angeles Cultural Affairs Department
- Type: movie palace
- Current use: cinema and live event venue

Construction
- Opened: January 20, 1931

Website
- www.warnergrand.org
- Warner Grand Theatre
- U.S. National Register of Historic Places
- Los Angeles Historic-Cultural Monument
- Location within the Los Angeles metropolitan area Location within California Location within the United States
- Coordinates: 33°44′19″N 118°17′29″W
- Architect: B. Marcus Priteca
- Architectural style: Art Deco, Moderne
- NRHP reference No.: 98001633
- LAHCM No.: 251

Significant dates
- Added to NRHP: January 21, 1999
- Designated LAHCM: August 25, 1982

The Warner Grand Theatre is a historic movie palace that opened on January 20, 1931. It is located in San Pedro, Los Angeles, California, at 478 West 6th Street.

The design of the Warner Grand Theatre was a collaboration by architect B. Marcus Priteca and interior designer Anthony Heinsbergen, in the Art Deco—Moderne style. It was one of three similarly lavish Los Angeles area Art Deco movie palaces on which Priteca and Heinsbergen collaborated for the Warner Bros. company in the early 1930s. The others were located in Beverly Hills and Huntington Park. Priteca later designed Hollywood's famous Pantages Theatre.

The theatre was purchased in 1996 and is still currently managed by the City of Los Angeles, Department of Cultural Affairs (DCA).

== Location ==
The Warner Grand Theatre is located at 478 West 6th Street in San Pedro. San Pedro is served by both the Los Angeles Department of Transportation and Los Angeles County Metropolitan Transportation bus systems. The nearest bus stops on the northeastern and southeastern corners of 7th Street and South Pacific Avenue for the LADOT 142 and LA Metro 246 and 950 Silver (J line) bus routes.

== Description ==
The Warner Grand Theatre (WGT) is one of three Art Deco/Moderne “neighborhood picture palaces” built by Warner Bros. Studio in the Los Angeles area. Seating for 1,489 patrons is split between a main floor orchestra (889) and a mezzanine loge and balcony (600). While built as a movie theater, Warner Grand today features a proscenium stage (50′ W x 32′ D) with a T-guided flys system suited to presenting concerts, dance, musicals, comedy and drama, and film screenings.

The City of Los Angeles acquired Warner Grand Theatre in 1996 and assigned operations and programming to DCA. Since that time, DCA has operated the facility as a low-cost rental and presenting house with a mission to make the facility and its resources available to artists and companies from around the City, and for use by local community groups and partners at an affordable cost.

In addition to an annual slate of productions, Warner Grand Theatre is a site for filming commercials, music videos, weddings and other special events.

Promotion and marketing of shows and events, equipment upgrades and restoration and renovation of the aesthetic features of the facility are accomplished through a partnership with Grand Vision Foundation, a San Pedro-based nonprofit that serves as the official Friends group of the Warner Grand Theatre.

== History ==
Warner Beverly Hills Theatre was demolished, and Warner Huntington Park was extensively altered, leaving the Grand as the last of the three original theaters remaining intact. By the mid-1990s it had suffered a lengthy period of neglect, despite having been declared a historical and cultural monument of the city in 1982.

The theater was facing possible demolition or re-development when, in 1995, a local group of activists formed the Grand Vision Foundation to work for the preservation of the historic building. Their efforts were successful when the theater was purchased by the Cultural Affairs Department (later renamed the Department of Cultural Affairs) of the City of Los Angeles in 1996. Efforts to both restore and program the theater have been ongoing since the acquisition. That same year, the Grand Vision Foundation incorporated as a 501(c)(3) charitable corporation, to preserve and promote the Warner Grand Theatre. In 1999, the Warner was added to the National Register of Historic Places as building #98001633.

Warner Grand Theatre currently hosts foreign films, art films, and family films presented by Cinema Grand, Grand Vision Foundation, the Los Angeles Harbor International Film Festival, and the San Pedro International Film Festival.

Jack L. Warner called it "The Castle of Your Dreams". The Warner Grand Theatre has also been used as a location in some movies, including Remote Control (1988), What's Love Got to Do with It (1993), Pearl Harbor (2001), and Babylon.

== Gallery ==
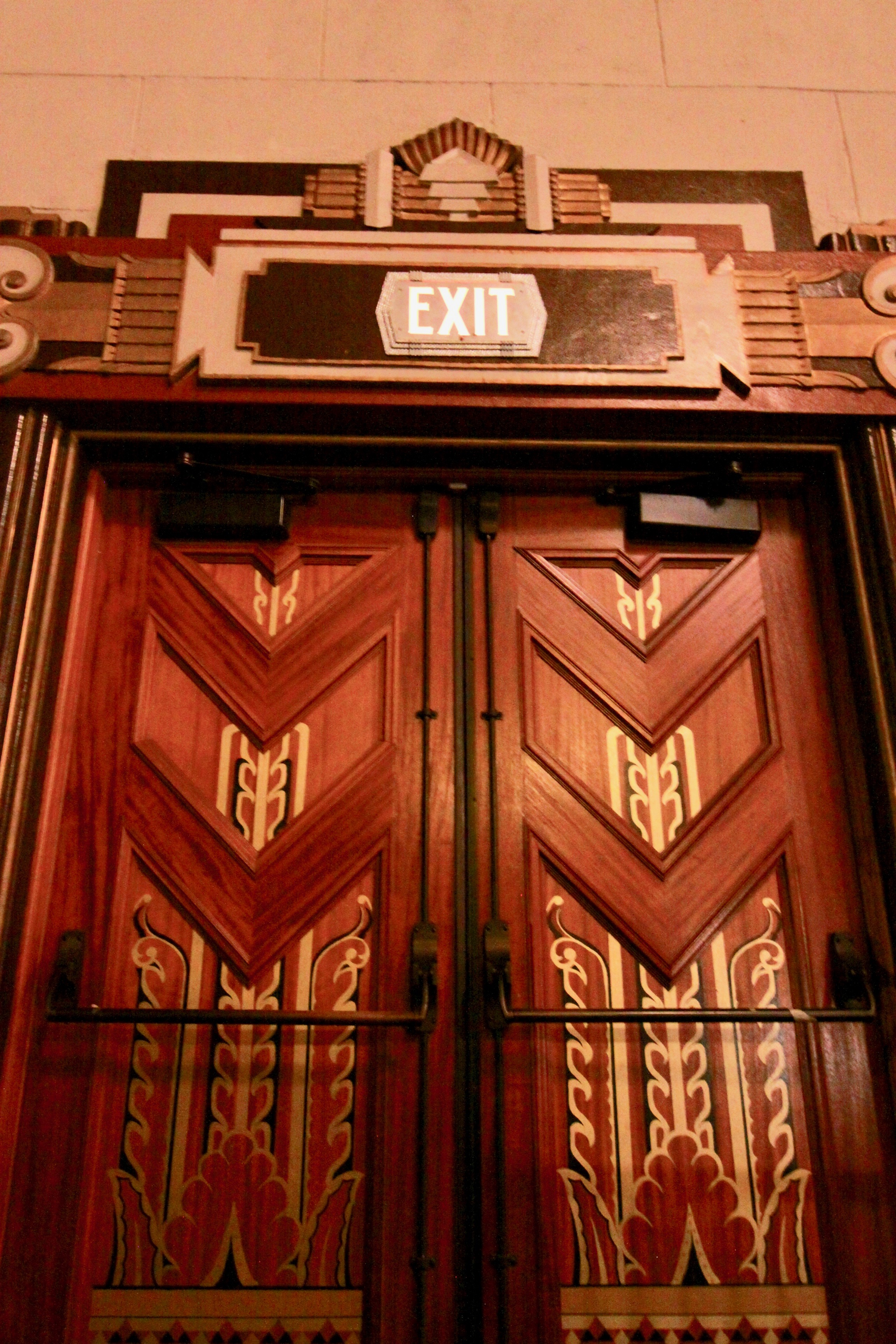

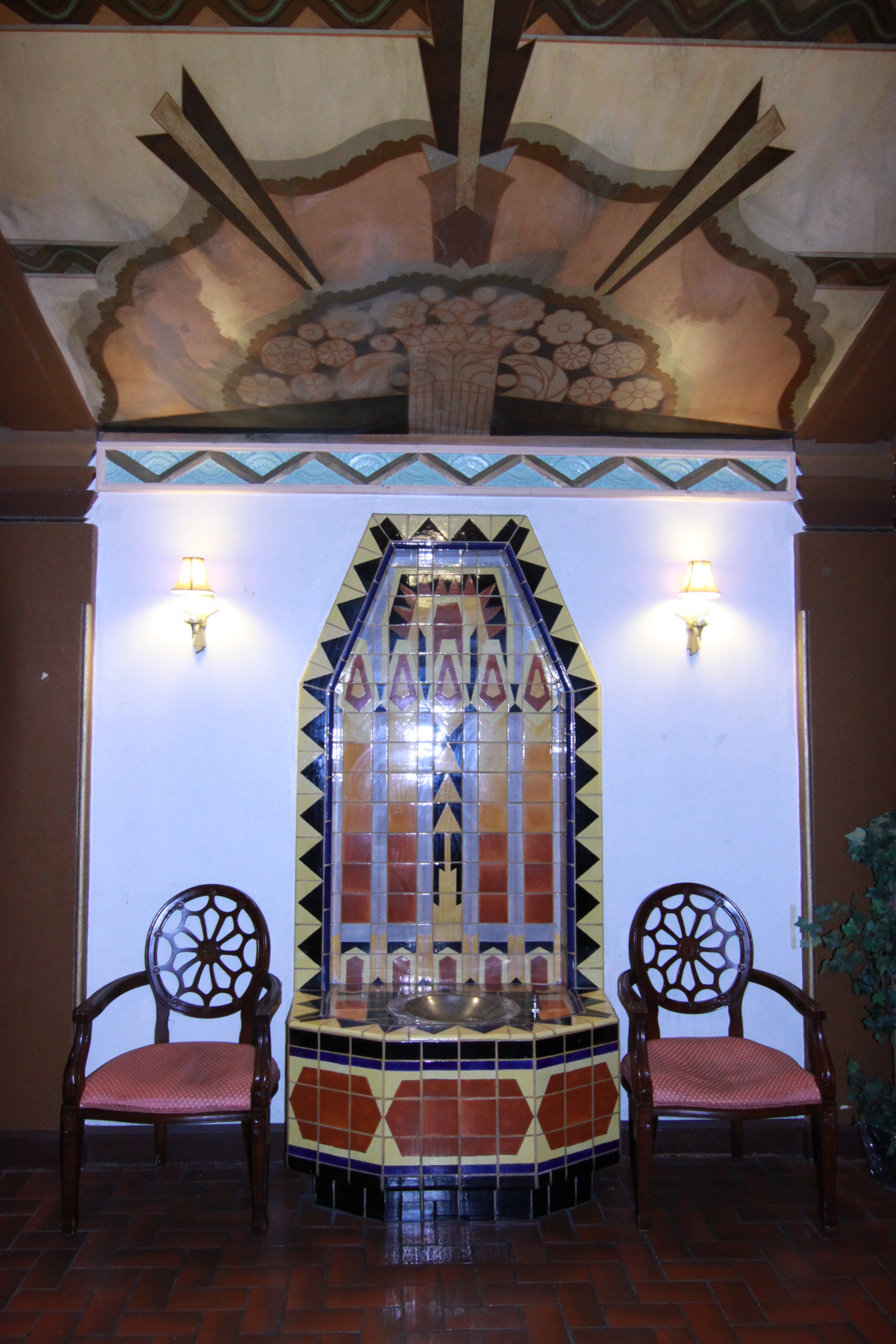

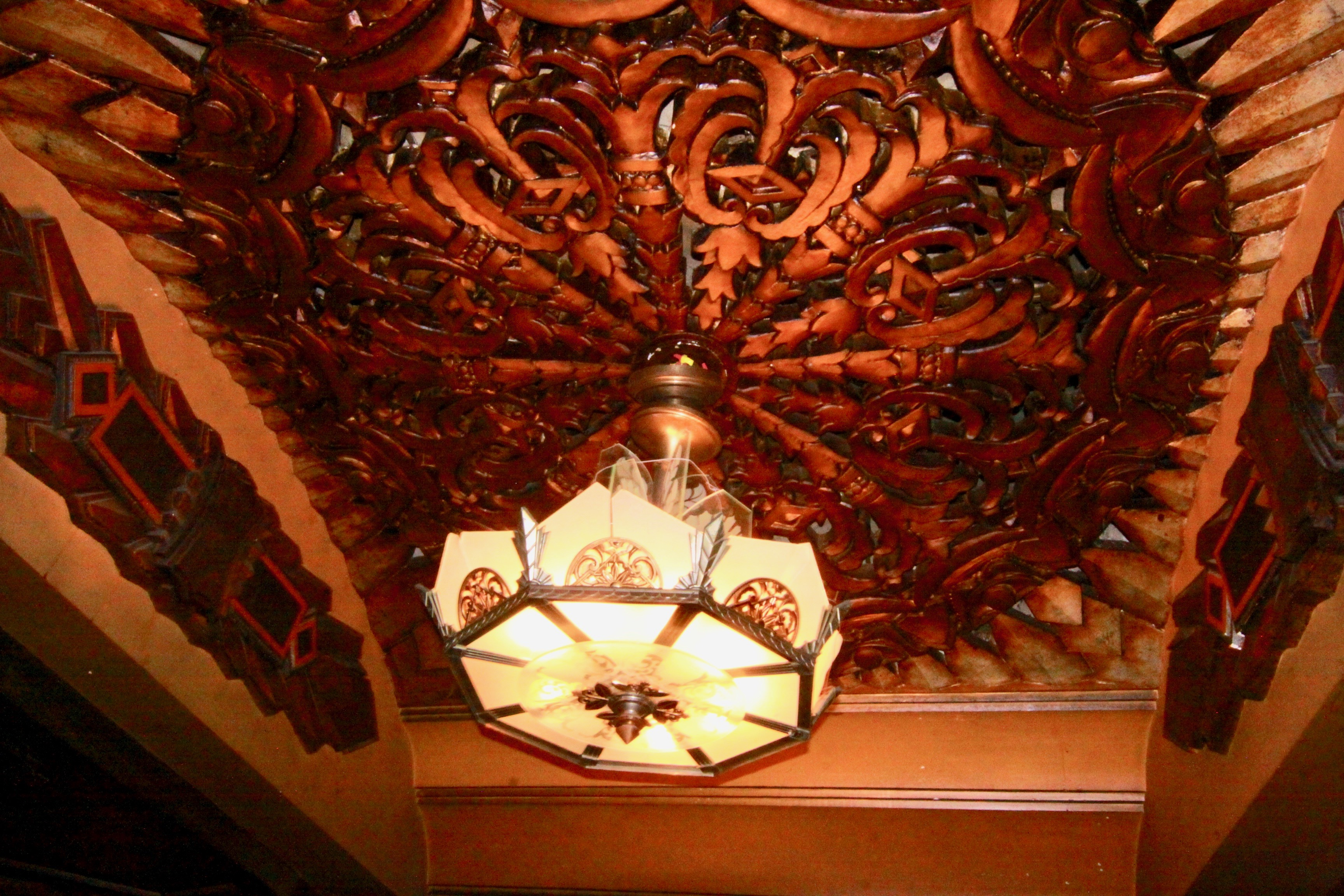

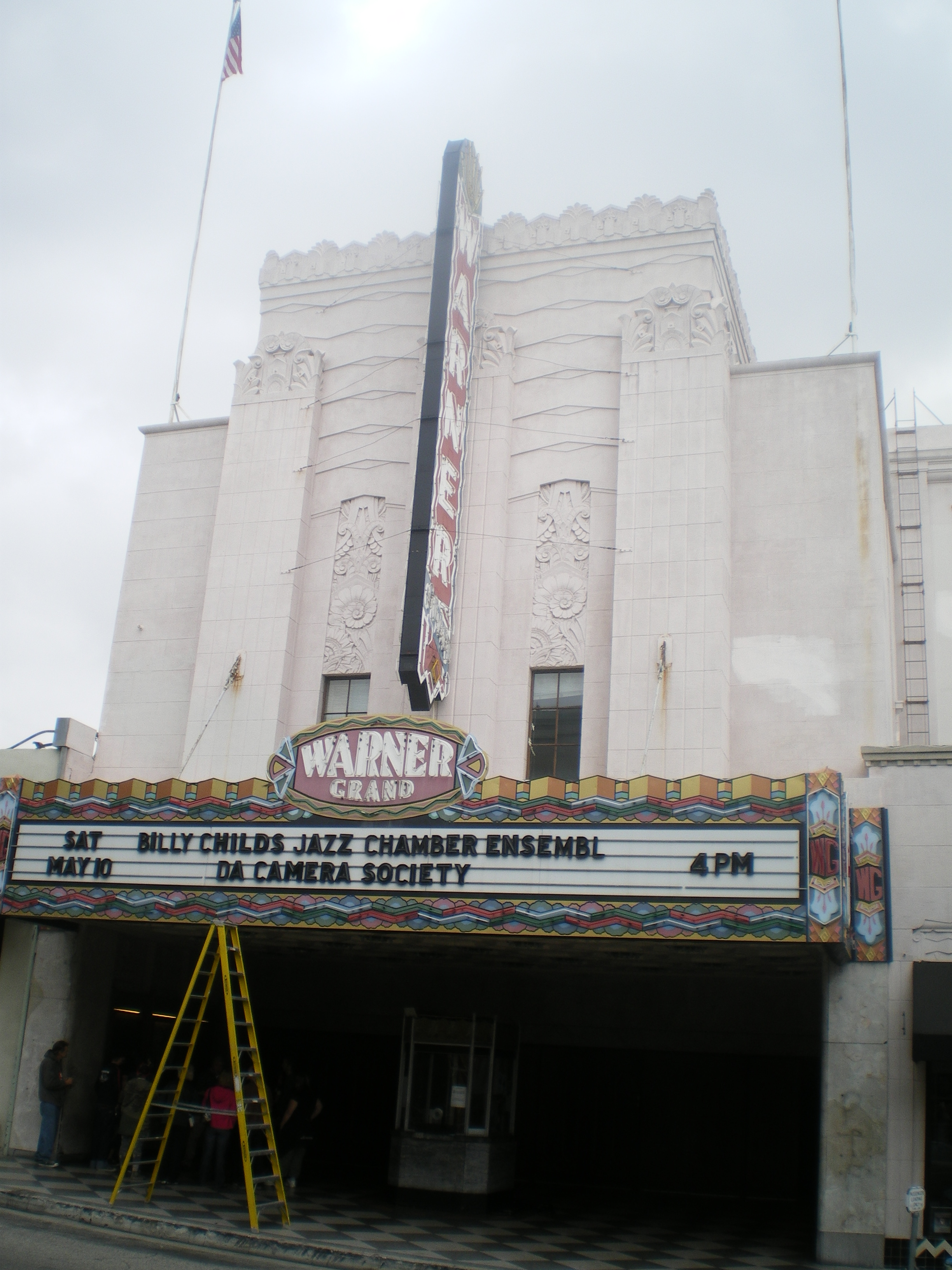

== See also ==
- List of Registered Historic Places in Los Angeles
- List of Los Angeles Historic-Cultural Monuments in the Harbor area
