= Fine Arts Theatre =

Coordinates: 34.0653°N 118.3779°W

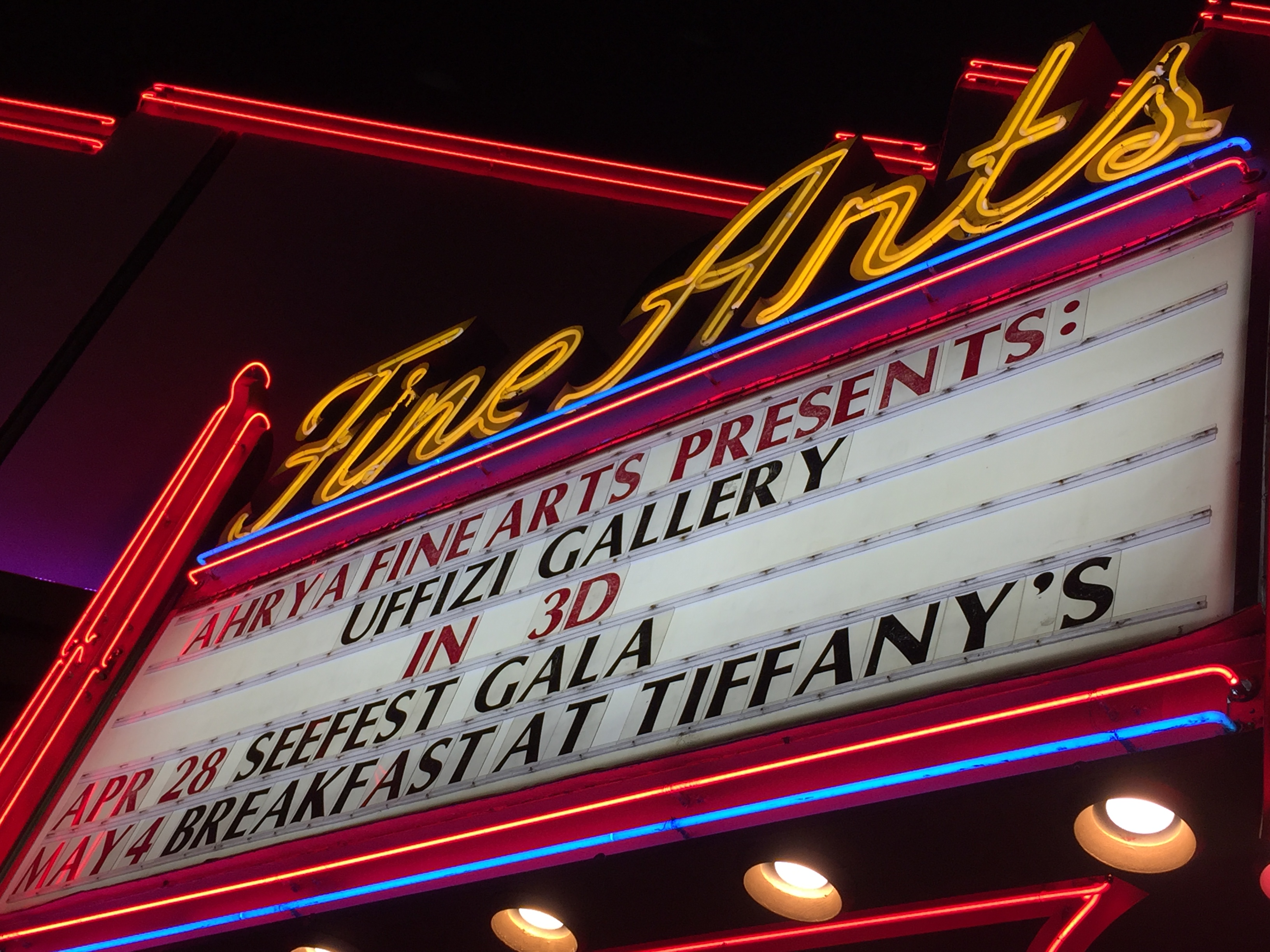

The Fine Arts Theatre is a historic theatre located at 8556 Wilshire Boulevard, Beverly Hills, California, US. It was constructed in 1936.

== History ==
Designed by B. Marcus Priteca, the Fine Arts Theatre opened as The Regina in 1936. Executed in the zigzag moderne style, it was remodeled and renamed the Fine Arts Theatre in 1948, premiering The Red Shoes and playing host to guests such as Susan Hayward, Joan Crawford, Ava Gardner, and Shirley Temple.

In 1993, it underwent a restoration spearheaded by Joseph J. Musil, a theater designer who also restored the El Capitan Theatre in Hollywood, and reopened as the Cecchi Gori Fine Arts Theatre. In 2010, Spice Global, an Indian conglomerate, bought the theater with plans to reopen it to screen Bollywood films, though this plan never materialized; former actress, Redken co-founder, and philanthropist Paula Kent Meehan bought it instead. Laemmle Theatres took over the management and operation of the theatre in September 2015. In May 2017, the Beverly Hills City Council designated the theatre a local historic landmark and placed the site on the Beverly Hills Register of Historic Properties.

== Gallery ==
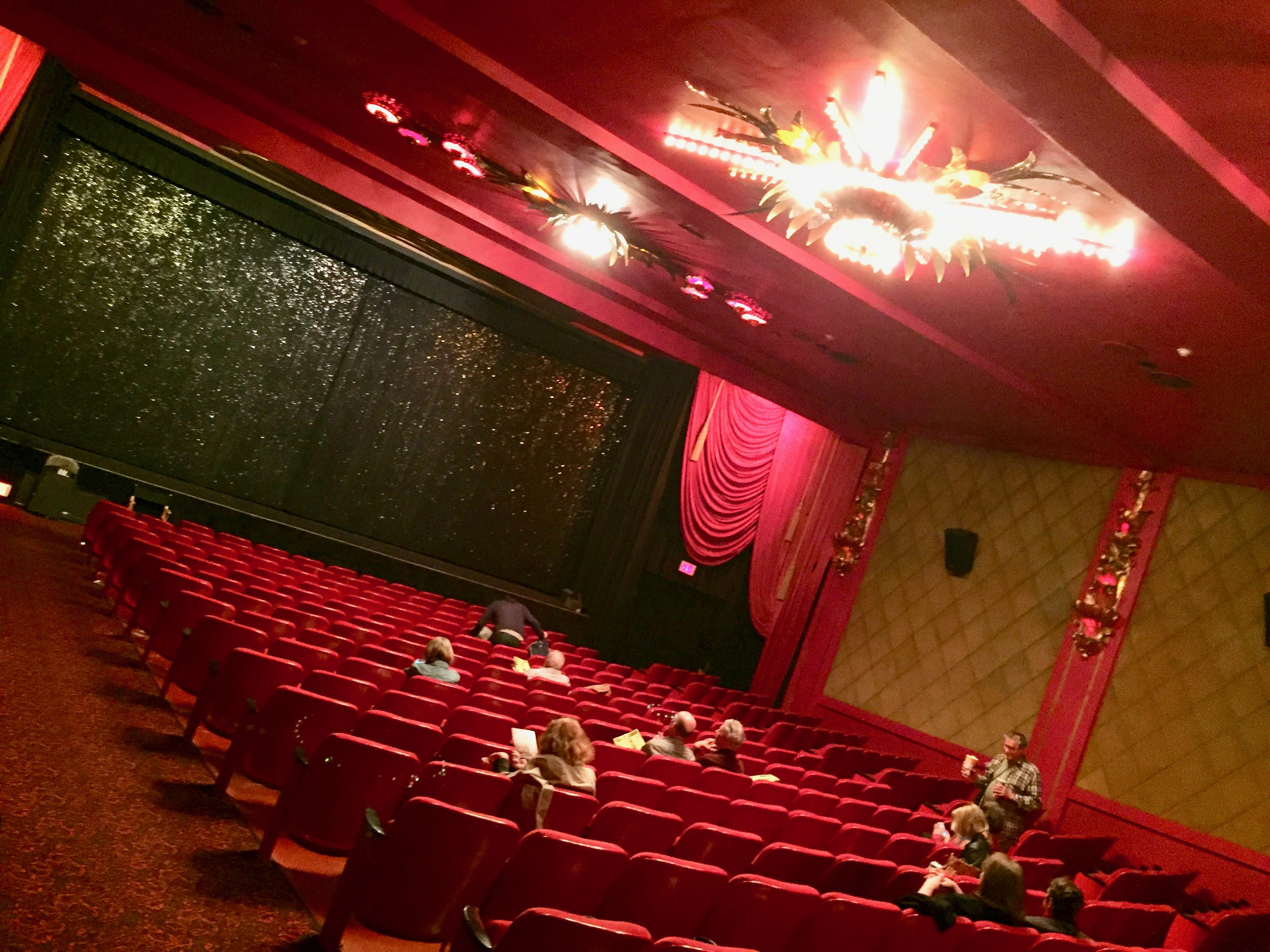
Inside the theater

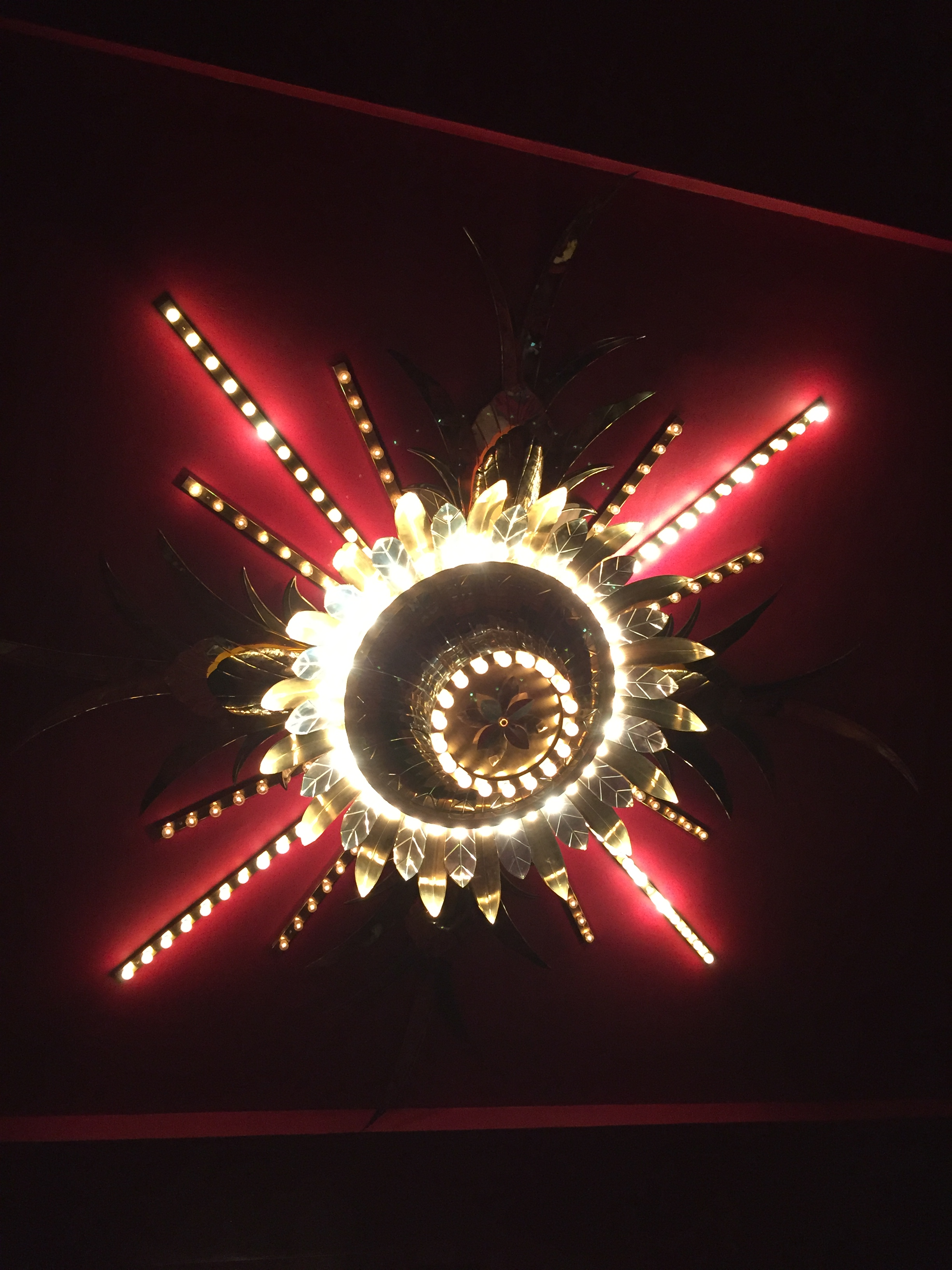
The theater's chandelier

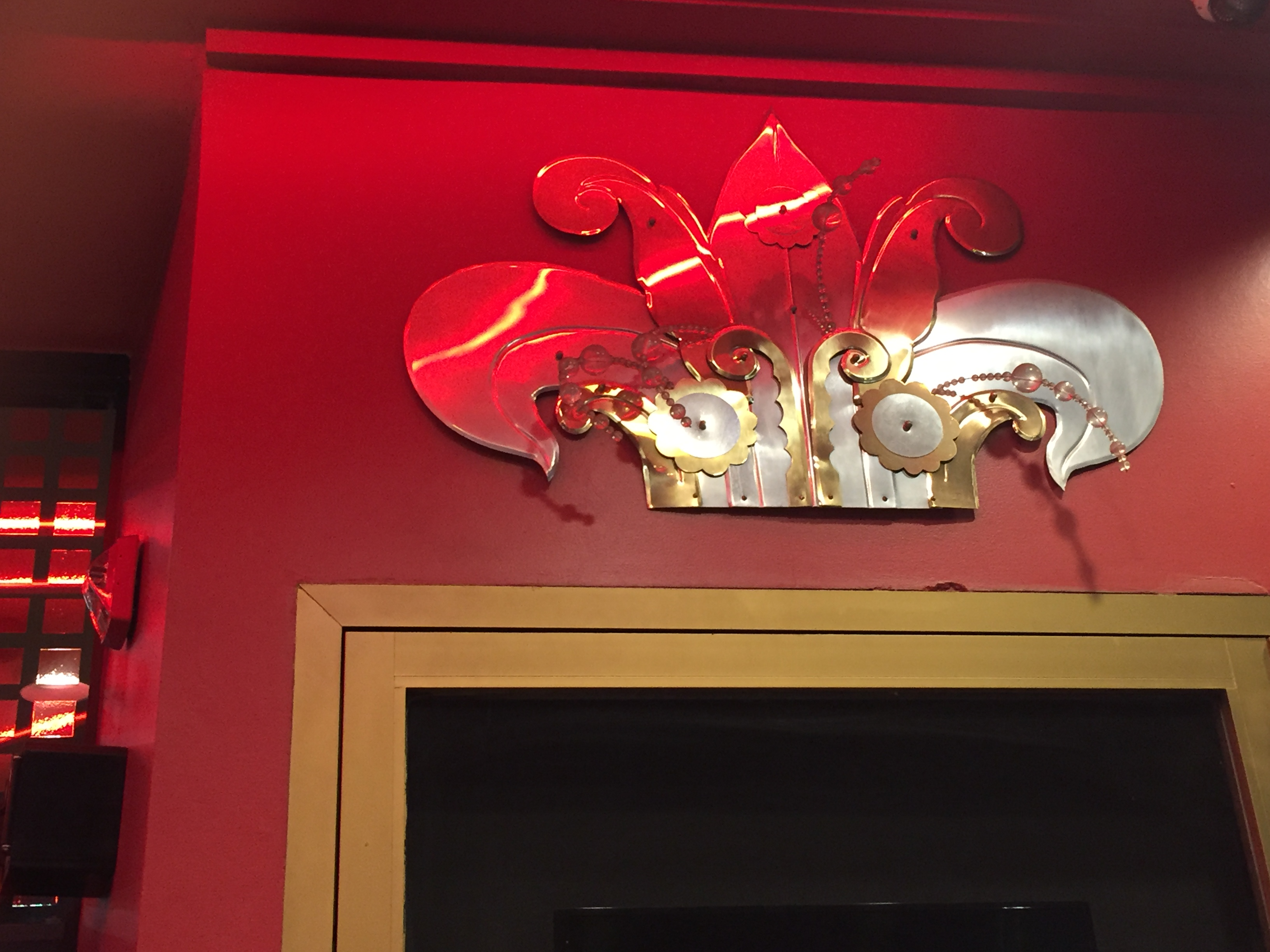
Wall embellishment
