= Wineman's =

Defunct department store based in Huntington Park, California

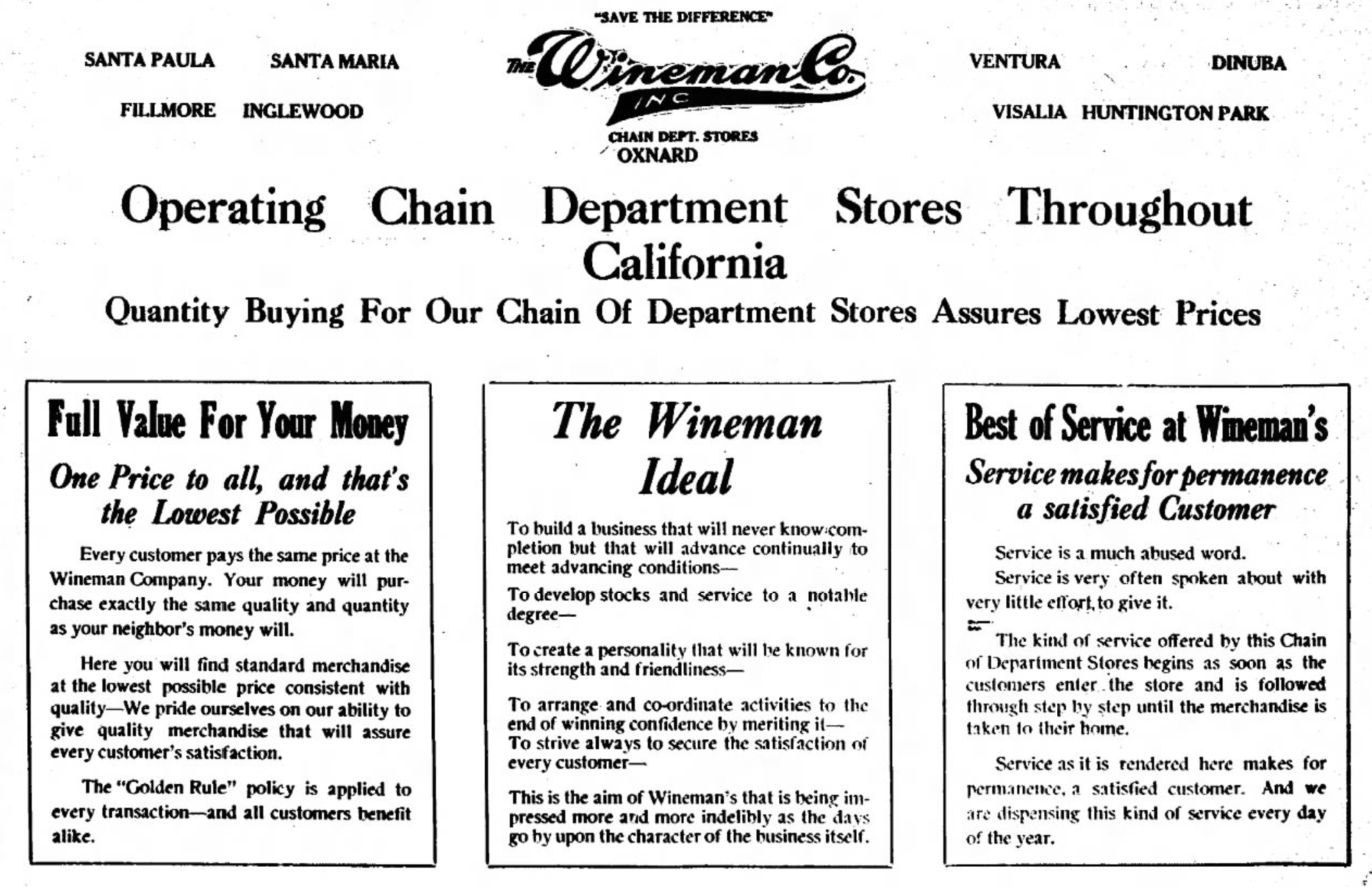
Wineman's advertisement in 1924, showing its ambitions to run a large chain of stores up and down the California coast

Wineman's was a chain of department stores in Southern and Central California which started in Ventura in 1890, and later became iconic local stores of Oxnard and Huntington Park.

== History ==
=== Origins (1890-1920) ===
Wineman's first opened a store in Ventura in 1890. In 1900, the Winemans went to nearby Oxnard and managed the Chicago Store while its owner or manager Frank Daly "was away" for an extended period. In 1902 the Winemans move from Ventura to Oxnard, built a brick building there at Fifth and Saviers, and opened a dry goods store on the ground floor, 75 x 80 ft. or 6,000 square feet (560 m^{2}). In 1903, Wineman's absorbed the Chicago Store.

The store expanded doubling its floor space in 1919 or 1920.

=== Expansion across California (early 1920s) ===
In the early 1920s, the store acquired other stores around the state. In July 1924 Wineman's moved its headquarters to the Grayco Building, 720 Los Angeles Street in Los Angeles and the company stated a goal of operating 100 stores "up and down the coast". By January 1925 they had branches in:

- Central Coast: Oxnard, Ventura, Santa Paula, Fillmore, Ventura, Santa Maria
- Central Valley: Dinuba, Visalia
- Los Angeles County:
  - Inglewood, opened August 15, 1924
  - Huntington Park - opened November 1924. Later, possibly in 1935, Wineman's moved to 6351 Pacific Boulevard – the 16,000 sq. ft., 1935-built building at #6351 is now the "Shoe Palace". Pacific Boulevard was the busiest shopping district in the southeastern Los Angeles suburbs from the 1930s through the 1950s.

=== Retreat to Oxnard and Huntington Park (late 1920s-1940) ===
The company's strategy took a dramatic turn when in October 1925, when Alvin Wineman resigned as president and manager of the company, though he remained as a board member. Buford Graves of the National City Bank of Los Angeles took over Wineman's position. At that same time it was announced that only Oxnard, "the mother store", and the Visalia store (considered one of the finest) would continue in operation.

In the end the company decided to concentrate its efforts in Oxnard and Huntington Park, and the Visalia (as well as the Fillmore) store closed on January 12, 1926.

The Oxnard store was closed in 1940.

=== Huntington Park single store (1940–1968) ===
The company continued to operate the Huntington Park alone, and as such the identity of Wineman's came to be tied to Huntington Park. The 1924 opening of the Huntington Park store became the new marker by which the store would measure its history; for example in 1974 it celebrated its 50th anniversary, even though there was significant history before 1924. The store expanded in 1940, 1957 and 1966 — from a 25-foot storefront in 1924 to one of 150 feet by 1966.

=== Second era of expansion (1969-1984) ===
For decades the Huntington Park store was the only location, but in 1969 it began to grow again. Branch stores added in this era were:

- Monrovia: Boston Stores bought McBratney's Department Store in 1969. Advertising for the location stopped in 1972 but still existed after Placentia opened, possibly closing before the opening of Mission Viejo location.
- Placentia, 110 E. Yorba Linda Blvd., 26,400 square feet (2,450 m^{2}), opened October 19, 1973
- Mission Viejo, Mission Viejo Village Center, opened c. September 1975
- Garden Grove at Garden Grove Mall, opened September 1, 1979.) Advertising for this location stopped shortly thereafter in 1980.
- Corona, 718 N. Main St. near Parkridge. Advertised 1981–2, in 1983 this address was Miller's Outpost. Opened at same time as Garden Grove, 1979.

=== Purchase by Boston Stores (1984) ===
In 1984, Boston Stores (the chain headquartered in Southern California; there were other chains similarly named) acquired Wineman's. The Mission Viejo and Placentia stores were subsequently advertised as Boston Store branches. There is no record of the Huntington Park Wineman's store ever having operated as a Boston Store. Garden Grove, Corona and Monrovia were closed before the acquisition by Boston Stores. Boston Stores went out of business in 1996.
