= Pacific Boulevard =

Boulevard in Huntington Park, California

Coordinates: 33°58′59″N 118°13′30″W

Pedestrians on the Pacific Boulevard shopping district

Pacific Boulevard is a street and principal commercial thoroughfare in the city of Huntington Park, California and the Los Angeles County neighborhood of Walnut Park. It runs from Vernon and Santa Fe Avenues in Vernon to Cudahy Street in Walnut Park before changing to Long Beach Boulevard. The Pacific Boulevard commercial district is the third highest grossing commercial district in the County of Los Angeles. The Christmas Lane Parade, seen in millions of homes via television throughout the United States and parts of Europe, has run down Pacific Boulevard since 1946. As many as 300,000 people attend the annual Carnaval Primavera (Spring Carnival) held on Pacific Boulevard each year. Pacific Boulevard is well known to Latino residents of the L.A. area, and a magnet for commerce, culture, and night life.

Pacific Boulevard represents a "Hispanic Mecca" for shopping, culture, and people watching. The area offers a variety of shopping options and features several national and regional tenants such as Bank of America, Chase Bank, AT&T, T-Mobile, Daniel's Jewelers, JCPenney, Foot Locker, El Gallo Giro, Don Roberto Jewelers, 3 Hermanos and Tierra Mia Coffee. Pacific Boulevard also has numerous independent clothing and specialty stores that offer products for special occasions such as baptisms, first communions, quinceañeras, formal events and weddings. (Id.) Several bars and restaurants feature live music and entertainment in the evenings.

Pacific Boulevard is a common location for remote broadcasts from local Spanish-language media stations. Television stations often profile successful businesses and popular festivals that attract hundreds of thousands of people, bringing national attention to the area.(Id.) The Pacific Blvd. commercial area is arguably the most important area to the city because of the tax revenue it generates and the significant amount of employment available for residents. It is the center of the city’s business improvement district (B.I.D.), an organization established in 1995 to focus on community and business revitalization efforts vis-à-vis the commercial business sector.(Id.)

== History ==
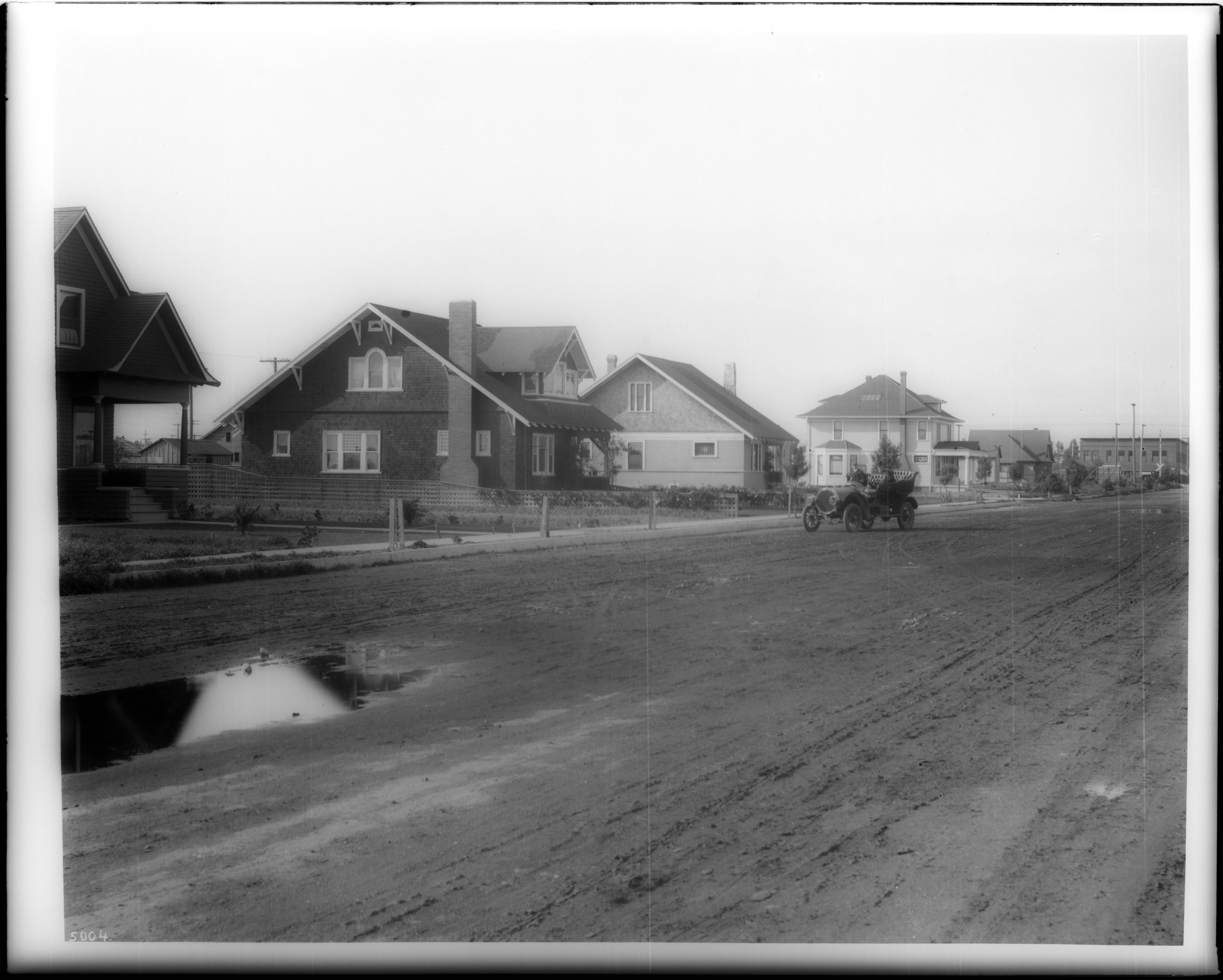
Looking north on Pacific Boulevard in Huntington Park, 1907

The Los Angeles Railway (local streetcars known as "Yellow Cars") J car ran along Pacific Boulevard and connected the area with Downtown Los Angeles until 1963. The stretch of Pacific Boulevard in downtown Huntington Park was a major commercial district serving the city's largely working-class residents, as well as those of neighboring cities such as Bell, Cudahy, and South Gate. A New York Times article from 2000 about Pacific Boulevard described it as once being, "the apotheosis of the postwar California dream, an all-white working-class Beverly Hills with swank department stores, auto dealerships and first-run cinemas." Major department stores included Montgomery Ward, J. C. Penney and local anchor Wineman's, as well as branches of Downtown Los Angeles-based chains such as Bond Stores. However, the thoroughfare was located three miles (5 km) from any freeway, which hampered growth. By 1968 more than sixty of its storefronts were vacant.

In the decades prior to the 1980s, the strip appeared to be derelict with vacancy rates up to 50 percent in its commercial spaces. By 1983, a wave of Latino immigrants during this time lead to dramatic improvements, making it again financially successful and heavily trafficked.

== Attractions ==
Warner Huntington Park is an Art Deco motion picture palace that was opened in 1930. The architect was B. Marcus Priteca, the architect who created the Pantages Theater in Hollywood. The Warner Huntington Park is the sister theater to the Warner Beverly Hills and the Warner Grand in San Pedro. The Warner Huntington Park Theatre originally seated 1,468 people. Huntington Park also boasted of the third Pussycat Theater to open in California. It was called The Lyric and was located at 7208 Pacific Boulevard.

El Gallo Giro is one of the ten highest grossing restaurants in the Los Angeles area. It opened in 1990, and by 2000 it had become the 7th most profitable Los Angeles County restaurant ranked by annual gross sales, with receipts of $6.7M.

== Local transportation ==
Metro Local lines 60 and 251 operate on Pacific Boulevard, as well as the LADOT Chesterfield Square line.
