= Warner Huntington Park =

Former theater in Huntington Park, CA

- Interactive map of Warner Huntington Park
- Address: 6714 Pacific Boulevard; Huntington Park
- Coordinates: 33.9784°N 118.2247°W
- Capacity: 1800 or 1468
- Type: Movie theater

Construction
- Opened: November 19, 1930
- Renovated: 1980s
- Closed: after 1991
- Architect: B. Marcus Priteca

Warner Huntington Park, later Pacific’s Warner 2, was a movie theater located at 6714 Pacific Boulevard in Huntington Park, California.

== History ==
Warner Huntington Park was designed by B. Marcus Priteca, the architect known for his work with the Pantages circuit. The interior was designed by Anthony Heinsbergen, making it was one of three theaters designed by Priteca and Heinsbergen for Warner Brothers, the others being Warner Grand Theatre and Warner Beverly Hills. This theater opened on November 19, 1930 with a screening of The Life of the Party. Joe E. Brown hosted the opening.

Pacific Theaters bought the theater in 1968 and by 1978 was using it to screen Spanish language cinema. The theater was divided into two (one in the orchestra pit, the other in the balcony) and renamed Pacific’s Warner 2 in the 1980s. The theater was still open as of December 1991.

The theater was declared a Huntington Park historic landmark in 2007. This, however, only protected the facade, and despite preservationist and local opposition, Huntington Park’s historic preservation commission later unanimously approved a permit to convert the theater to a gymnasium. The theater was converted in 2018 and was boarded up in 2024.

== Architecture and design ==
Warner Huntington Park featured an Art Deco and Italian-Spanish design.
