= Coliseum Theater (Seattle) =

- U.S. National Register of Historic Places
- Seattle Landmark
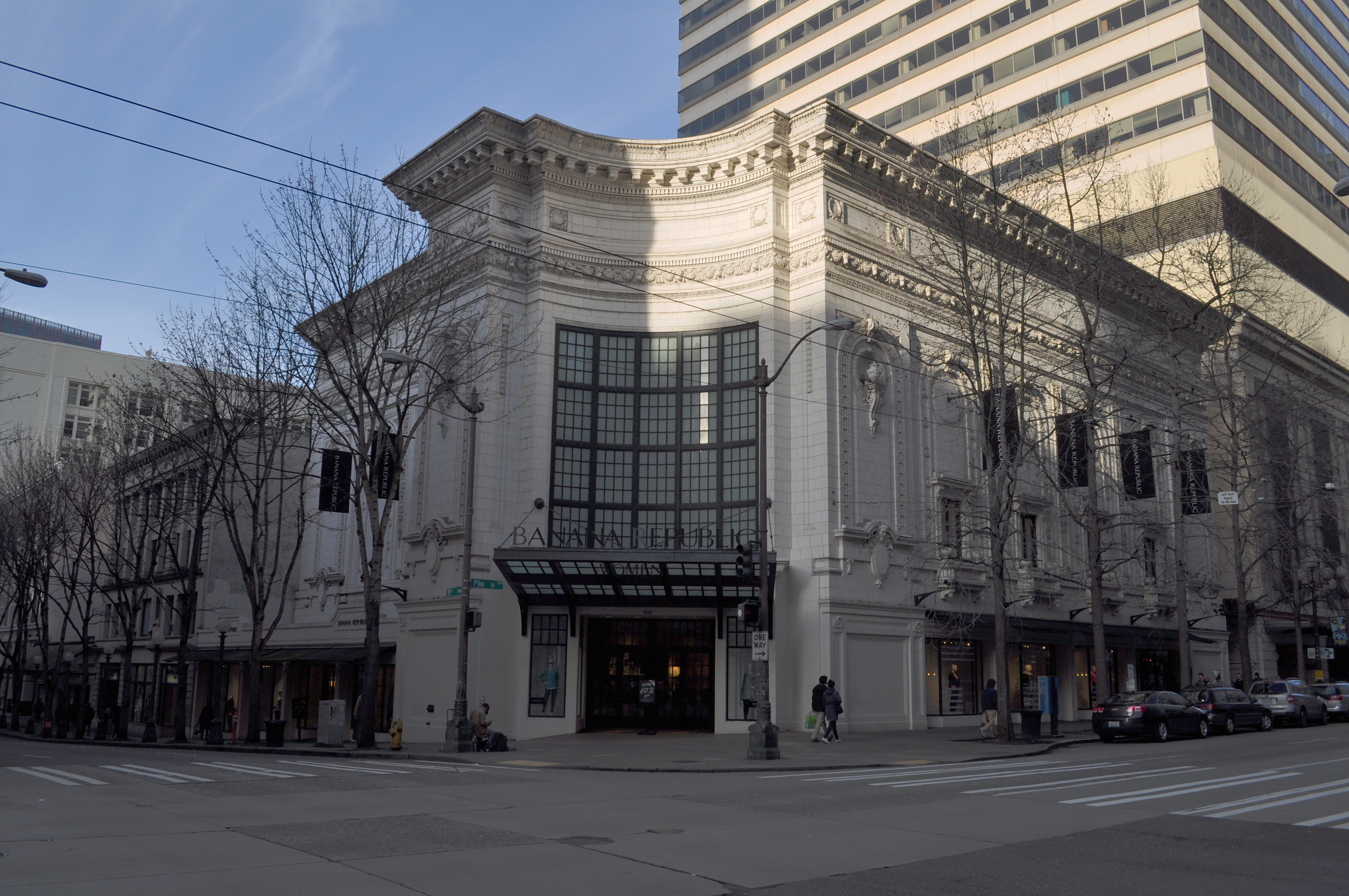
- The Coliseum Theater on a winter day.

- Location within Downtown Seattle
- Location: 5th Ave. and Pike St. Seattle, Washington
- Coordinates: 47°36′41″N 122°20′2″W
- Built: 1916
- Architect: Priteca, B. Marcus
- Architectural style: Late 19th And 20th Century Revivals, Second Renaissance Revival
- NRHP reference No.: 75001854

Significant dates
- Added to NRHP: July 7, 1975
- Designated SEATL: January 17, 1978

The Coliseum Theater, a former cinema in Seattle, Washington, opened January 8, 1916. It was listed on the National Register of Historic Places in 1975, and is also an official Seattle city landmark. Designed by B. Marcus Priteca, it was Seattle's first theater built specifically for showing movies, and was one of the first cinemas anywhere to strive for architectural grandeur. When it opened, it was advertised as "the world's largest and finest photoplay palace." In 1931, the Journal of the Royal Institute of Architects called it "the first of the world's movie palaces."

The exterior features elaborate terra cotta work, and the original interior was comparably ornate. When it opened in the silent film era, it boasted a 7-piece orchestra plus an organist; the giant organ was made by Moller, and the musicians—all Russians—were reputed to be the highest-paid movie theater musicians in the country. Anita King attended the opening night to give a speech dedicating the theater.

The Coliseum continued as a first-run theater into the late 1970s, and continued to show films until 1990. It closed on March 11, 1990, after showing the film Tremors; the building was renovated into a 15,000-square-foot (1,400 m^{2}) Banana Republic clothing store that opened in 1994. The store closed in 2020 and is planned to be replaced by a temporary art space by XO Seattle in 2023. XO Seattle moved from the space after co-founder Austin Bellamy Hicks was accused of sexually assaulting two women. Since 2024 it has been occupied by the women-run artist collective Actualize AiR.
