= Warnors Theatre =

- Pantages, Alexander, Theater
- U.S. National Register of Historic Places
- Location: 1400 Fulton Street; Fresno, California
- Coordinates: 36°44′17″N 119°47′40″W
- Built: 1928
- Architect: B. Marcus Priteca
- Architectural style: Spanish Colonial Revival
- NRHP reference No.: 78000663
- Added to NRHP: February 23, 1978

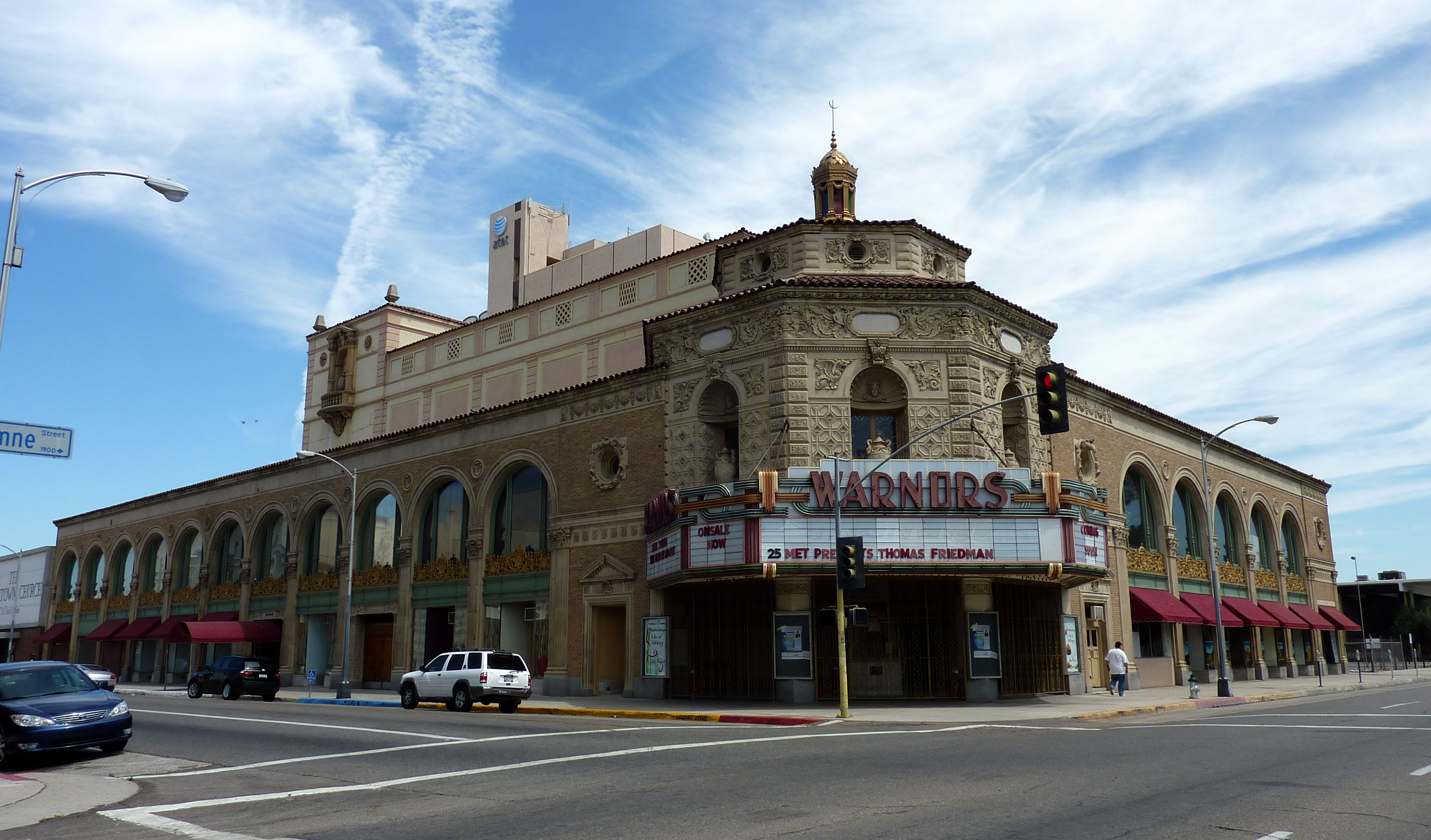

Warnors Theatre is a historic theater located in downtown Fresno, California. The 2,100-seat venue opened in 1928 as the Pantages Theater, named after its then owner, Alexander Pantages. After it was purchased by Warner Brothers in 1929, it was known as the Warner Theater. In the 1960s, the name was changed to "Warnors" in order to avoid trademark issues.

The theater was designed by B. Marcus Priteca, and is listed on the National Register of Historic Places.

== Organ ==
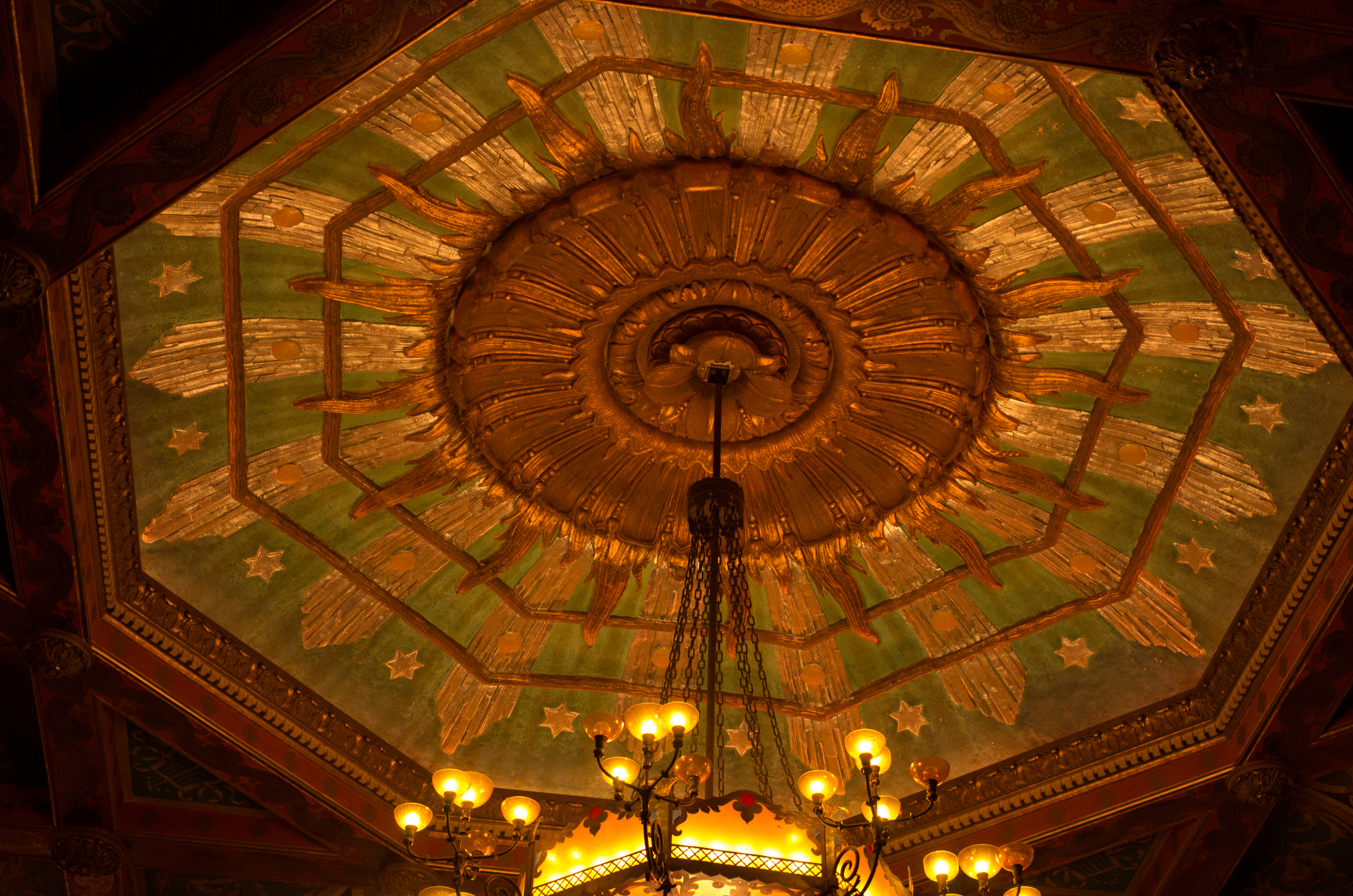
Ornate ceiling of the Warnors Theatre

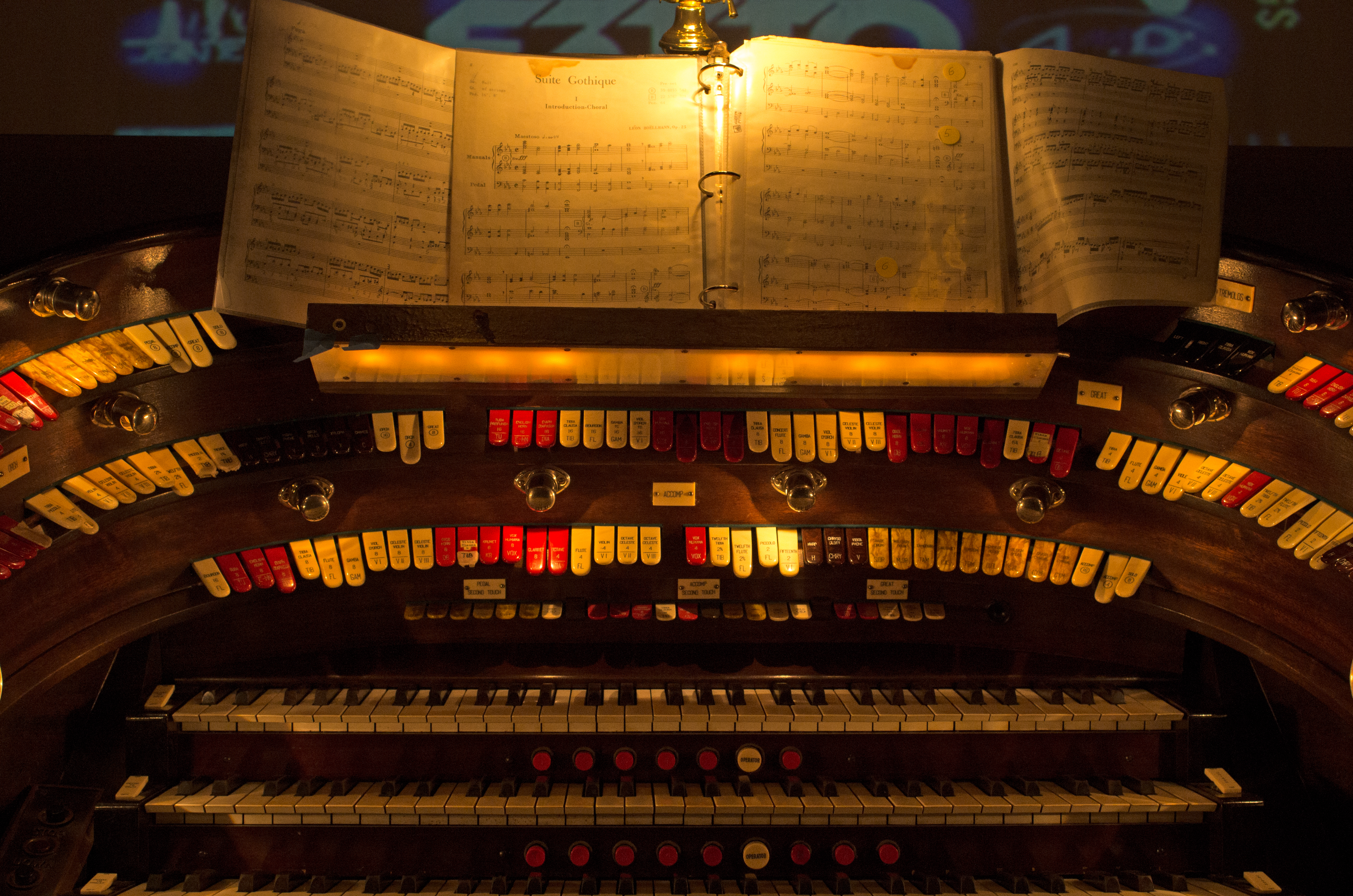
Warnors Theatre Pipe Organ

The theater features a unit orchestra (a pipe organ which includes numerous features and instruments, meant to be able to replicate sounds of a full orchestra with only one organist), which was manufactured by the Robert Morton Organ Company of Van Nuys, California and installed in 1928. The organ was to be used to accompany silent films. Around the same time the organ was to be installed, movies were beginning to include sound. The theater tried to cancel the order but the organ was installed anyway. The organ has 14 ranks built with 1,035 pipes and a four-manual console with 720 keys, pedals and combination pistons. The organ was used primarily for motion pictures until 1973. Because of the cost of paying orchestra members, most accompanying orchestras were replaced with unit orchestras.

The Berlin Philharmonic gave a concert in the theater on November 15, 1956, under its new music director Herbert von Karajan.

== California's Gold ==
In 2006, Warnors Theatre was featured in an episode of the PBS program California's Gold, hosted by Huell Howser. Howser delved into the story of the Caglia family, and their role in the restoration of the theatre after they bought it in 1973.
