= Warner Beverly Hills Theater =

Former theater in Beverly Hills, California, US

- Interactive map of Warner Beverly Hills Theater
- Address: 9404 Wilshire Boulevard; Beverly Hills
- Coordinates: 34.0670°N 118.3972°W
- Capacity: approximately 2000
- Type: Movie theater

Construction
- Built: 1930-1931
- Opened: May 19, 1931
- Renovated: 1956
- Closed: 1987
- Demolished: 1989
- Architect: B. Marcus Priteca

Warner Beverly Hills Theater, also known as Warner Beverly, was a movie theater located at 9404 Wilshire Boulevard in Beverly Hills, California. It was considered "the pride of Beverly Hills" and "one of the most splendid Art Deco theatres in Los Angeles."

== History ==
Warner Beverly Hills Theater was designed by B. Marcus Priteca, the architect known for his work with the Pantages circuit. The interior was designed by Anthony Heinsbergen, making the theater was one of three designed by Priteca and Heinsbergen for Warner Bros. Pictures, the others being Warner Grand Theatre and Warner Huntington Park. This theater was built in 1930–1931, sat approximately 2,000, and opened on May 19, 1931, with a screening of The Millionaire.

The theater held the west coast premiere of White Christmas on October 27, 1954 and underwent an $80,000 refurbishing in 1956 ($947,368 in 2025) in preparation for the release of The Ten Commandments. It was equipped with 70mm projectors c. 1960 and was bought by Pacific Theatres later that decade.

The theater closed as a movie theater in the late 1970s, after which it briefly operated as a live theater, then came back as a movie theater, then was converted to a rock venue named The Beverly. The Beverly was not liked by locals and closed in 1987. The building itself was demolished shortly after, this despite it being in good cosmetic condition. It was owned by Columbia Savings and Loan Association at the time, and the company did not want to pay for the $12 million ($31.2 million in 2025) seismic upgrade the building required. It was replaced by a parking lot.

== Architecture and design ==
Warner Beverly Hills Theater was considered "the pride of Beverly Hills" and "one of the most splendid Art Deco theatres in Los Angeles." The building featured a distinguishing vertical mast tower sign that spelled "Warner" in neon letters and was capped by a spiked finial. The building also featured ornate molding and plasterwork, pilasters outlined in neon, a "blind staircase", and storefronts with chevron grillwork and black and yellow geometric designed ceramic tile baseboards.

The theater interior was designed by Robert E. Power Studio and featured a combined Art Deco, Spanish, and Mexican design. The lobby, open to the mezzanine, featured carved ceilings incised with jungle foliage. Marble stairs led from the mezzanine to upstairs lounges that featured ceiling murals depicting flamenco dancers in an "almost Cubist" style. The downstairs lounge featured a large copper scallop shell drinking fountain, while copper and glass light fixtures were featured throughout.

The theater's auditorium featured a Spanish fan that spread over the proscenium and overlapped with geometric plaster and stencilling that crowded the ceiling and traveled down the walls to the floor. The auditorium itself was colored maroon and gold with pink and aqua accents.
