= Huntington Park, California =

City in California, United States

- City
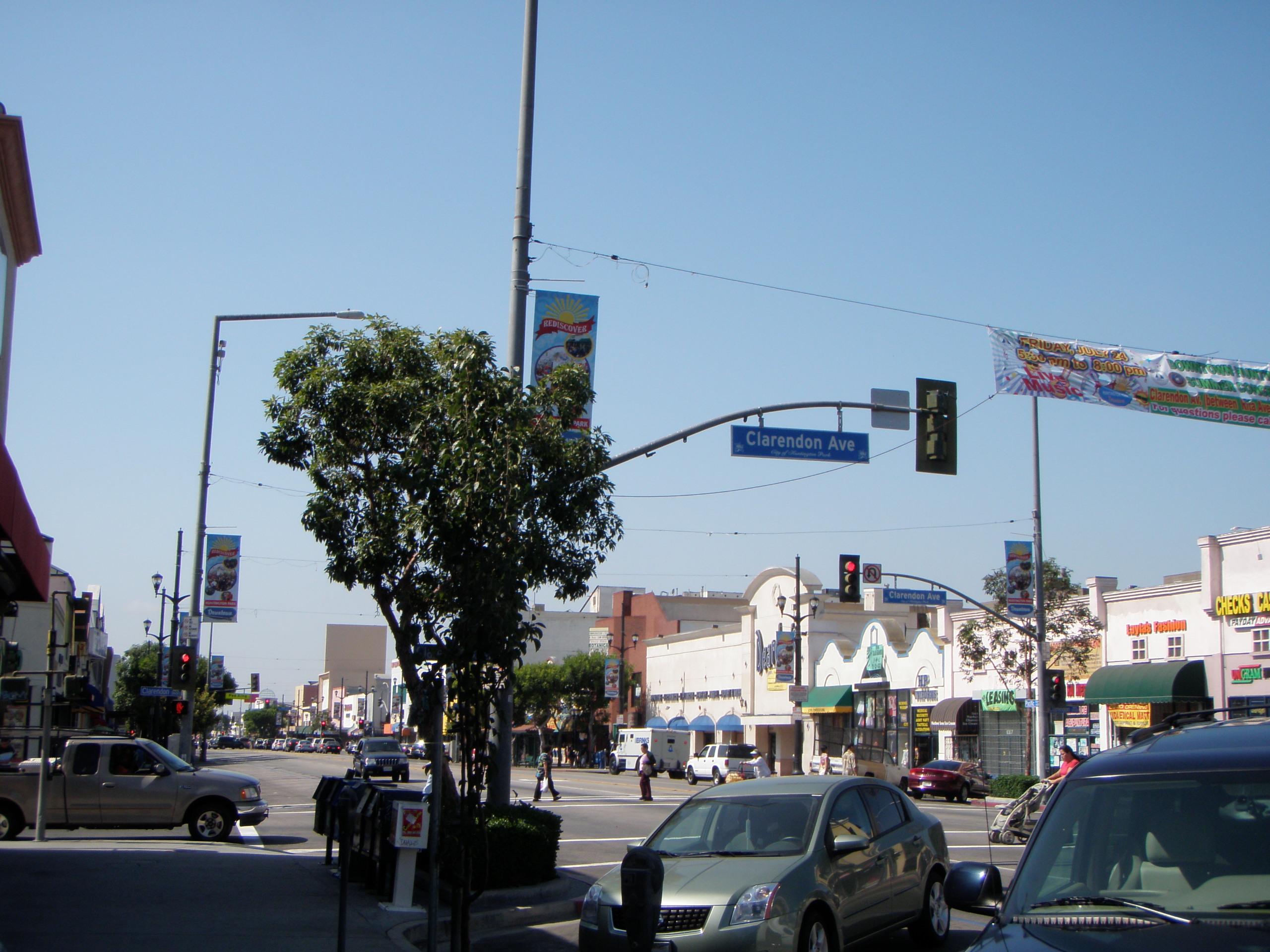
- Pacific Boulevard and Clarendon Avenue, 2009

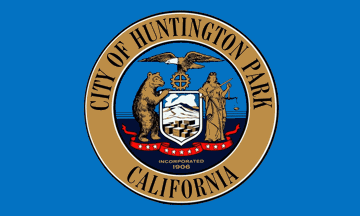
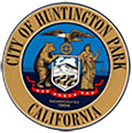
- Flag Seal
- Interactive map of Huntington Park, California
- Location in the United States
- Coordinates: 33°59′N 118°13′W
- Country: United States
- State: California
- County: Los Angeles
- Incorporated: September 1, 1906

Government
  - Type: Council–manager
  - Mayor: Eduardo Martinez
  - Vice Mayor: Jonathan Sanabria
  - City Council: Karina Macias; Arturo Flores; Nancy Martiz

Area
  - Total: 3.02 sq mi (7.81 km^{2})
  - Land: 3.01 sq mi (7.80 km^{2})
  - Water: 0.0039 sq mi (0.01 km^{2}) 0.11%
- Elevation: 171 ft (52 m)

Population (2020)
  - Total: 54,883
  - Estimate (2024): 52,166
  - Density: 18,200/sq mi (7,040/km^{2})
- Time zone: UTC−8 (Pacific)
  - Summer (DST): UTC−7 (PDT)
- ZIP Code: 90255
- Area code: 323
- FIPS code: 06-36056
- GNIS feature IDs: 1660778, 2410079
- Website: hpca.gov

Huntington Park is a city located in the South Central region of Los Angeles County, California, United States. The area includes the separate communities of Florence, Firestone Park, Graham, and Walnut Park, California. As of the 2020 census, the city had a total population of 54,883, of whom 97% are Hispanic/Latino and about half were born outside the U.S.

Huntington Park and its Pacific Boulevard area is a mostly Hispanic, working-class inner Southeast L.A. area.

== History ==
The first European to arrive to the area was Francisco Salvatore Lugo.

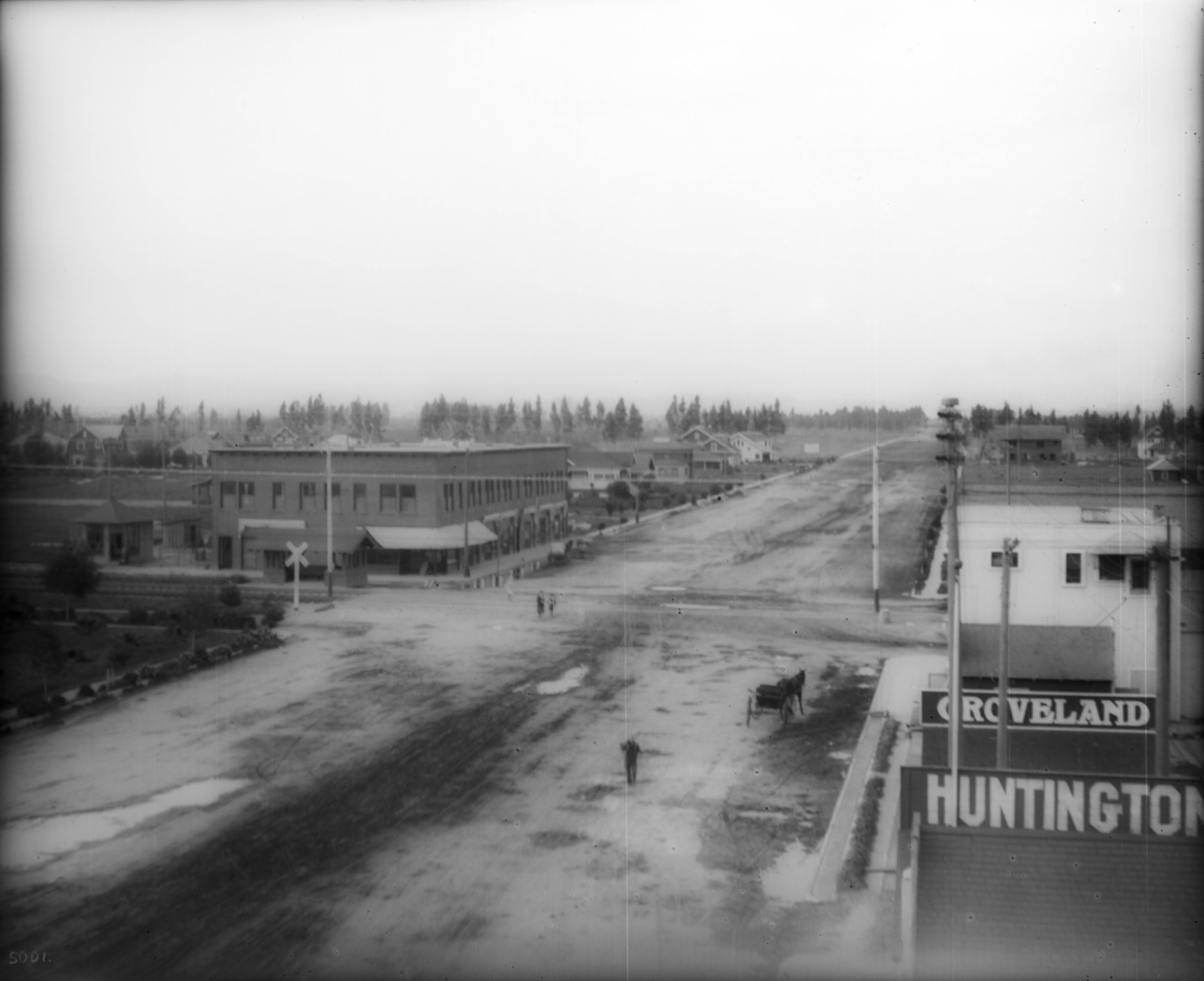
Looking north on Pacific Boulevard, 1907

Named for prominent industrialist Henry E. Huntington, Huntington Park was incorporated in 1906 as a streetcar suburb on the Los Angeles Railway for workers in the rapidly expanding industries to the southeast of downtown Los Angeles. To this day, about 30% of its residents work at factories in nearby Vernon and Commerce. The stretch of Pacific Boulevard in downtown Huntington Park was a major commercial district serving the city's largely working-class residents as well as being the retail hub of Southeast Los Angeles County. As with most of the other cities along the corridor stretching along the Los Angeles River to the south and southeast of downtown Los Angeles, Huntington Park was an almost exclusively white community during most of its history; Alameda Street and Slauson Avenue, which were fiercely defended segregation lines in the 1950s, separated it from black areas.

The changes that shaped Los Angeles from the late 1970s onward—the decline of American manufacturing that began in the 1970s; the rapid growth of newer suburbs in Orange County, the eastern San Gabriel, western San Fernando and Conejo valleys; the collapse of the aerospace and defense industry at the end of the Cold War; and the implosion of the Southern California real estate boom in the early 1990s—resulted in the wholesale departure of virtually all of the white population of Huntington Park by the mid-1990s. The vacuum was filled almost entirely by two groups of Latinos: upwardly mobile families eager to leave the barrios of East Los Angeles, and recent Mexican immigrants. Today, Pacific Boulevard is once again a thriving commercial strip, serving as a major retail center for working-class residents of southeastern Los Angeles County—only now targeting a Hispanic public with many signs in Spanish.

== Geography ==
Before California abolished judicial townships (some time after 1960), Huntington Park was located in San Antonio Township.

According to the United States Census Bureau, the city has a total area of 3.0 square miles (7.8 km^{2}), all land.

Cities surrounding Huntington Park include Bell, Cudahy, Los Angeles, Maywood, South Gate, and Vernon. Huntington Park is also bordered by the unincorporated communities of Walnut Park to the south and Florence-Firestone to the west.

=== Climate ===
On average, there are 286 sunny days per year in Huntington Park, California. Annually the snowfall is 0 inches. The July high is around 82 degrees. The January low is 48. As of 2015 the average high temperatures have risen ranging from the low to mid 90s (°F).

== Demographics ==
Historical population
Census	Pop.	Note	%±
1910	1,299		—
1920	4,513		247.4%
1930	24,591		444.9%
1940	28,648		16.5%
1950	29,450		2.8%
1960	29,920		1.6%
1970	33,744		12.8%
1980	45,932		36.1%
1990	56,065		22.1%
2000	61,348		9.4%
2010	58,114		−5.3%
2020	54,883		−5.6%
U.S. Decennial Census; 1860–1870 1880–1890; 1900 1910 1920; 1930 1940 1950; 1960 1970 1980; 1990 2000 2010; 2020

Huntington Park first appeared as a city in the 1910 U.S. census as part of the now defunct San Antonio Township (pop. 107,894 in 1930).

=== Racial and ethnic composition ===
Huntington Park city, California – Racial and ethnic composition Note: the US Census treats Hispanic/Latino as an ethnic category. This table excludes Latinos from the racial categories and assigns them to a separate category. Hispanics/Latinos may be of any race.
Race / Ethnicity (NH = Non-Hispanic)	Pop 1980	Pop 1990	Pop 2000	Pop 2010	Pop 2020	% 1980	% 1990	% 2000	% 2010	% 2020
White alone (NH)	8,019	3,046	1,657	935	759	17.35%	5.43%	2.70%	1.61%	1.38%
Black or African American alone (NH)	129	429	304	211	389	0.28%	0.77%	0.50%	0.36%	0.71%
Native American or Alaska Native alone (NH)	109	99	121	29	22	0.24%	0.18%	0.20%	0.05%	0.04%
Asian alone (NH)	539	775	433	320	313	1.17%	1.38%	0.71%	0.55%	0.57%
Native Hawaiian or Pacific Islander alone (NH)	539	775	11	15	21	1.17%	1.38%	0.02%	0.03%	0.04%
Other race alone (NH)	107	220	34	89	202	0.23%	0.39%	0.06%	0.15%	0.37%
Mixed race or Multiracial (NH)	x	x	152	70	191	x	x	0.25%	0.12%	0.35%
Hispanic or Latino (any race)	37,320	51,496	58,636	56,445	52,986	80.74%	91.85%	95.58%	97.13%	96.54%
Total	46,223	56,065	61,348	58,114	54,883	100.00%	100.00%	100.00%	100.00%	100.00%

=== 2020 census ===
As of the 2020 census, Huntington Park had a population of 54,883 and a population density of 18,245.7 inhabitants per square mile (7,044.7/km^{2}).

The median age was 33.3 years. The age distribution was 25.4% under the age of 18, 11.3% aged 18 to 24, 28.9% aged 25 to 44, 23.7% aged 45 to 64, and 10.7% aged 65 or older. For every 100 females, there were 97.9 males, and for every 100 females age 18 and over there were 95.8 males.

The census reported that 99.2% of the population lived in households, 0.2% lived in non-institutionalized group quarters, and 0.5% were institutionalized. Huntington Park was 100.0% urban and 0.0% rural.

There were 15,118 households, of which 47.5% had children under the age of 18 living in them. Of all households, 43.7% were married-couple households, 9.8% were cohabiting couple households, 29.0% had a female householder with no spouse or partner present, and 17.5% had a male householder with no spouse or partner present. About 13.9% of households were made up of individuals, and 5.6% had someone living alone who was 65 years of age or older. The average household size was 3.6. There were 12,168 families (80.5% of all households).

There were 15,494 housing units at an average density of 5,150.9 units per square mile (1,988.8 units/km^{2}), of which 15,118 (97.6%) were occupied and 2.4% were vacant. Of the occupied units, 26.6% were owner-occupied and 73.4% were renter-occupied. The homeowner vacancy rate was 0.3%, and the rental vacancy rate was 1.9%.

In 2023, the US Census Bureau estimated that the median household income was $56,952, and the per capita income was $20,346. About 15.5% of families and 17.6% of the population were below the poverty line.

=== 2012 childhood obesity study ===
A 2012 study by the California Center for Public Health Advocacy found Huntington Park, California had the highest percentage of overweight children in all of California with 53% of the city's child population being obese or overweight.

=== 2010 census ===
At the 2010 census Huntington Park had a population of 58,114. The population density was 19,270.0 inhabitants per square mile (7,440.2/km^{2}). The racial and ethnic makeup of Huntington Park was 56,445 (97.1%) Hispanic or Latino, 29,776 (51.2%) White (1.6% Non-Hispanic White), 440 (0.8%) African American, 752 (1.3%) Native American, 393 (0.7%) Asian, 28 (0.0%) Pacific Islander, 24,535 (42.2%) from other races, and 2,190 (3.8%) from two or more races.

The census reported that 57,859 people (99.6% of the population) lived in households, 248 (0.4%) lived in non-institutionalized group quarters, and 7 (0%) were institutionalized.

There were 14,597 households, 8,581 (58.8%) had children under the age of 18 living in them, 7,461 (51.1%) were opposite-sex married couples living together, 3,212 (22.0%) had a female householder with no husband present, 1,623 (11.1%) had a male householder with no wife present. There were 1,377 (9.4%) unmarried opposite-sex partnerships, and 81 (0.6%) same-sex married couples or partnerships. 1,644 households (11.3%) were one person and 694 (4.8%) had someone living alone who was 65 or older. The average household size was 3.96. There were 12,296 families (84.2% of households); the average family size was 4.19.

The age distribution was 18,439 people (31.7%) under the age of 18, 6,984 people (12.0%) aged 18 to 24, 17,886 people (30.8%) aged 25 to 44, 10,942 people (18.8%) aged 45 to 64, and 3,863 people (6.6%) who were 65 or older. The median age was 28.9 years. For every 100 females, there were 99.6 males. For every 100 females age 18 and over, there were 97.8 males.

There were 15,151 housing units at an average density of 5,023.9 per square mile, of the occupied units 3,936 (27.0%) were owner-occupied and 10,661 (73.0%) were rented. The homeowner vacancy rate was 1.5%; the rental vacancy rate was 3.2%. 18,054 people (31.1% of the population) lived in owner-occupied housing units and 39,805 people (68.5%) lived in rental housing units.

During 2009–2013, Huntington Park had a median household income of $36,397, with 28.7% of the population living below the federal poverty line.

=== 2000 census ===
According to the census of 2000, there were 61,348 people in 14,860 households, including 12,660 families, in the city. Speakers of Spanish as their first language accounted for 90.77% of residents, while English was spoken by 9.17%, Chinese by 0.05% of the population.

The median household income was $28,941 and the median family income was $29,844. Males had a median income of $21,039 versus $16,733 for females. The per capita income for the city was $9,340. About 23.3% of families and 25.2% of the population were below the poverty line, including 31.5% of those under age 18 and 18.7% of those age 65 or over.

Mexican (75.8%) and Salvadoran (3.4%) were the most common ancestries. Mexico (80.4%) and El Salvador (7.2%) were the most common foreign places of birth.

== Arts and culture ==
Pedestrians on the Pacific Boulevard shopping district

=== Pacific Boulevard ===
==== Architecture ====
Pacific Boulevard was the busiest shopping district in the southeastern Los Angeles suburbs from the 1930s through the 1950s and boasted numerous department stores including the local Wineman's. Notable Streamline Moderne architecture includes the Lane-Wells Company Building and the W. W. Henry Company Building. Art Deco architecture is found in Huntington Park's commercial district, and include the former theaters along Pacific Blvd. The 1,468 seat Warner Theater on Pacific Boulevard opened in 1930, and was designed by B. Marcus Priteca. The California Theatre opened in 1925 and was operated by Fox Theatres as the Fox California Theatre. In the 1980s it was known as the California 3 Theatre. The theatre closed in 2006 and was later converted into a retail space. It was renamed California 2 Theatres and now there is a tuxedo shop along with other retail stores and restaurants. In 2019, the theater had been converted into a fitness center for recreational use.

==== Festival and fairs ====
Pacific Boulevard, the commercial business street of Huntington Park, has been the location for festivals, carnival fairs and parades. The "Carnaval Primavera" is held each year for three days across nine blocks of Pacific Boulevard in Huntington Park. The event features Central American and Mexican food, carnival rides, games, and live music.

=== Public libraries ===
The County of Los Angeles Public Library operates the Huntington Park Library.

== Government ==
In the Los Angeles County Board of Supervisors, Huntington Park is in the Fourth District, represented by Democrat Janice Hahn.

In the California State Senate, Huntington Park is in California's 33rd senatorial district, represented by Democrat Lena Gonzalez.

In the California State Assembly, Huntington Park is in California's 62nd State Assembly district, represented by Democrat Jose Solache.

In the United States House of Representatives, Huntington Park is in California's 42nd congressional district, represented by Democrat Robert Garcia.

In Huntington Park’s City Council, they are represented by Arturo Flores, Karina Macias, Nancy Martiz, and for Mayor, Eduardo Martinez, and for Vice Mayor, Jonathan Sanabria.

== Education ==
Huntington Park is zoned to schools in the Los Angeles Unified School District.

Public elementary schools in Huntington Park include:

- Hope Street Elementary School
- Huntington Park New Elementary
- Middleton Elementary School and Middleton New Primary Center
- Miles Elementary School
- Pacific Boulevard School
- San Antonio Elementary School
- Lucille Roybal- Allard Elementary School
- Aspire: Antonio Maria Lugo Academy
- Aspire: Titan Academy
- Aspire: Junior Collegiate Academy

Public middle schools include:

- Gage Middle School
- Nimitz Middle School
- Centennial College Preparatory Academy
- Aspire: Ollin University Preparatory Academy
- Prepa Tec

Public high schools include:

- Huntington Park High School
- Alliance Collins Family College Ready High School
- Aspire Pacific Academy
- Linda Esperanza Marquez High School
- Maywood Academy High School
- Alliance Margaret M. Bloomfield High School
- Diego Rivera Learning Complex

In addition Pacific Boulevard Special Education Center (ungraded) is in the city.

Private schools include:

- Church of the Nazarene School
- St. Matthias Catholic Elementary School
- Interamerican Adult School

== Infrastructure ==
=== Emergency services ===
Fire protection in Huntington Park is provided by the Los Angeles County Fire Department. The Huntington Park Police Department provides law enforcement.

=== Transportation ===
Bus services are provided by both the Los Angeles County Metropolitan Transportation Authority, LADOT Dash, LADPW "The Link" and Huntington Park's own municipal bus service. Slauson station and Florence station on the Metro A Line are near the city and serve its residents.

== Notable people ==
- Lois Andrews - actress, notable for her portrayal of the comics character Dixie Dugan
- Elton Gallegly - former US Representative, California's 24th District
- Leon Leyson - youngest person on Schindler's List, taught at Huntington Park High School.
- Rosario Marin - 41st Treasurer of the United States and a former mayor of Huntington Park
- Lorenzo Mata - professional basketball player
- Jeremy McKinney - professional football player
- Wilbur Nelson - minister at Grace Church of Huntington Park and radio broadcaster
- Slayer - American thrash metal band originated out of Huntington Park
- Tim Wallach - professional baseball player
- Terry Wilson - stuntman and actor, noted for his role as "Bill Hawks" on the television series Wagon Train
- Tex Winter - basketball coach
- Dana Plato - actress

== See also ==
- South Central Los Angeles
