= B. Marcus Priteca =

Scottish architect (1889–1971)

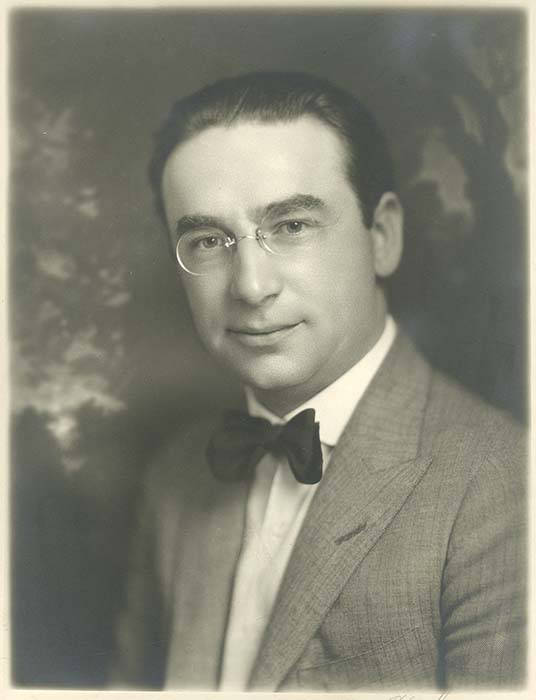
- Born: Benjamin Marcus Priteca; 23 December 1889; Glasgow, Scotland
- Died: 1 October 1971 (aged 81); Seattle, Washington, U.S.

Benjamin Marcus Priteca FAIA (23 December 1889 – 1 October 1971) was a Jewish-American architect. He is best known for designing theatres for Alexander Pantages.

== Early life ==
Benjamin Marcus Priteca was born into a Jewish family in Glasgow on 23 December 1889. His nickname was "Benny". He served an apprenticeship in Edinburgh under architect Robert MacFarlane Cameron from 1904 to 1909, and earned degrees from the University of Edinburgh and the Royal College of Arts during this time. In 1909, he emigrated to the U.S. and settled in Seattle.

== Career ==
Priteca met Seattle vaudeville theatre owner Alexander Pantages in 1910 and won a commission from him to design the San Francisco Pantages Theater (1911), the first of many so-named vaudeville and motion picture houses in what would become one of the largest theater chains in North America.

In all, Priteca designed 22 theaters for Pantages and another 128 for other theater owners. Pantages is said to have liked Priteca as a theater architect for his ability to create the appearance of opulence within a less-than-opulent budget. Pantages is quoted as saying, "Any damn fool can make a place look like a million dollars by spending a million dollars, but it's not everybody who can do the same thing with half a million."

Priteca's apprentices included Gregory Ain, who went on to success as a modernist architect (practicing in a very different manner). Ain worked with Priteca for a short time in the late 1920s and helped draw the Los Angeles Pantages. In 1951, Priteca became a Fellow of the American Institute of Architects. He remained active as an architect well into his later years, working as a consultant in the design of the Seattle Opera House (1962) and the Civic Auditorium (1968) in Portland, Oregon.

== Death ==
Priteca died in Seattle on 1 October 1971, at the age of 81. His first name was mistakenly recorded as "Bernard" on his death certificate. He was posthumously awarded honorary membership of the Theatre Historical Society of America.

== Works ==
=== Theaters ===
- Coliseum (1915), Seattle, NRHP-listed
- Pantages (1918), Tacoma, NRHP-listed
- Pantages (1920), Los Angeles
- Pantages (1924), San Diego
- Pantages (1926), San Francisco
- Orpheum (1927), Vancouver, NHSC-listed
- Pantages (1928), Fresno, NRHP-listed
- Paramount (1929), Seattle
- Pantages (1929), Hollywood, NRHP-listed
- Warner Huntington Park (1930)
- Warner Grand (1931), San Pedro, NRHP-listed
- Warner Beverly Hills (1931)
- Fine Arts Theatre (1936), Beverly Hills
- Admiral (1942), West Seattle, NRHP-listed

=== Other buildings ===
- Chevra Bikur Cholim synagogue (1912), Seattle, Washington
- Crystal Pool natatorium (1916), Seattle
- Temple De Hirsch Sinai, Alhadeff Sanctuary, Seattle
- Keller Auditorium, Portland, Oregon
- Longacres racetrack clubhouse and grandstand, Renton, Washington

== Gallery ==
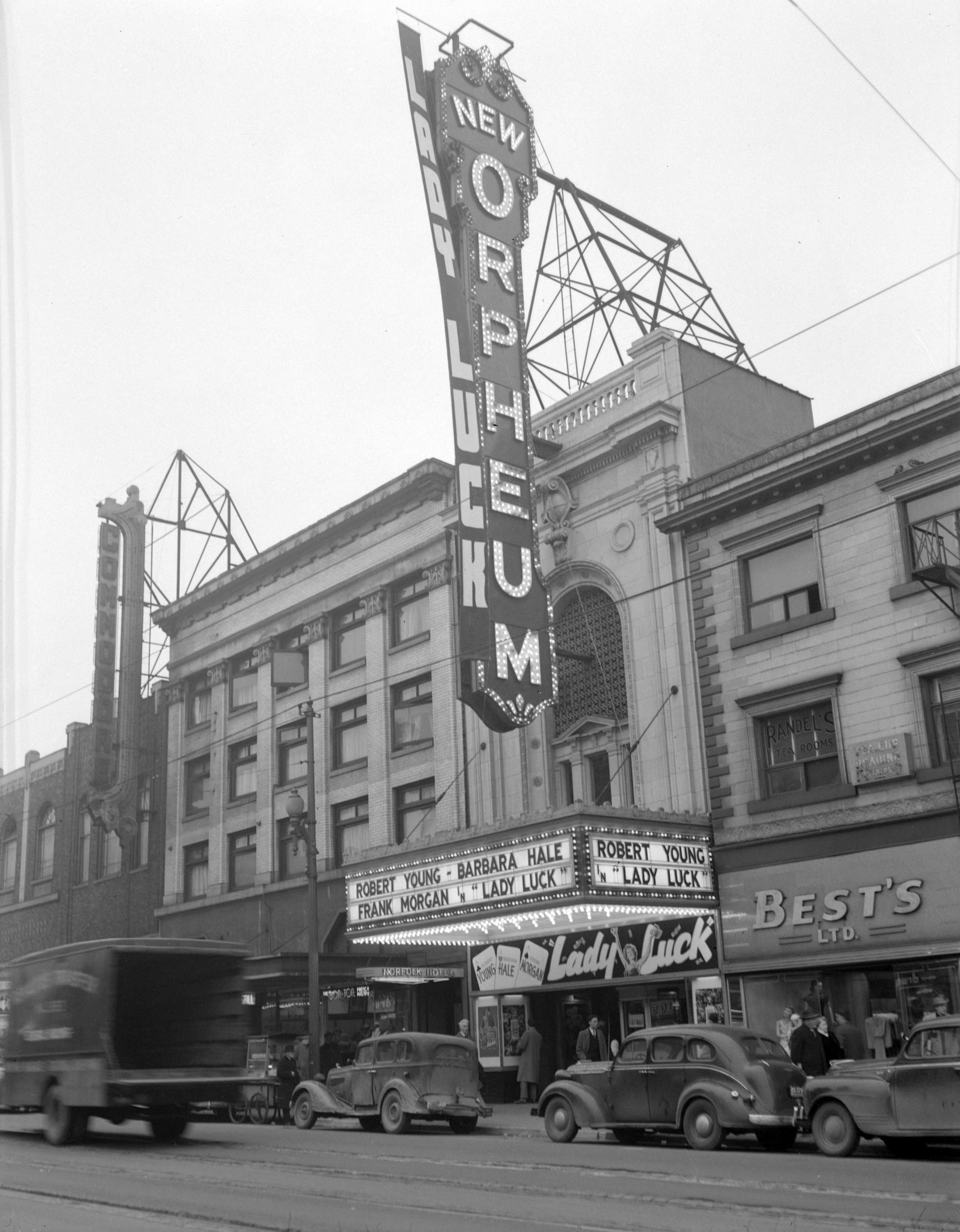
Priteca's Orpheum Theatre on Granville Street in Vancouver, c. 1946

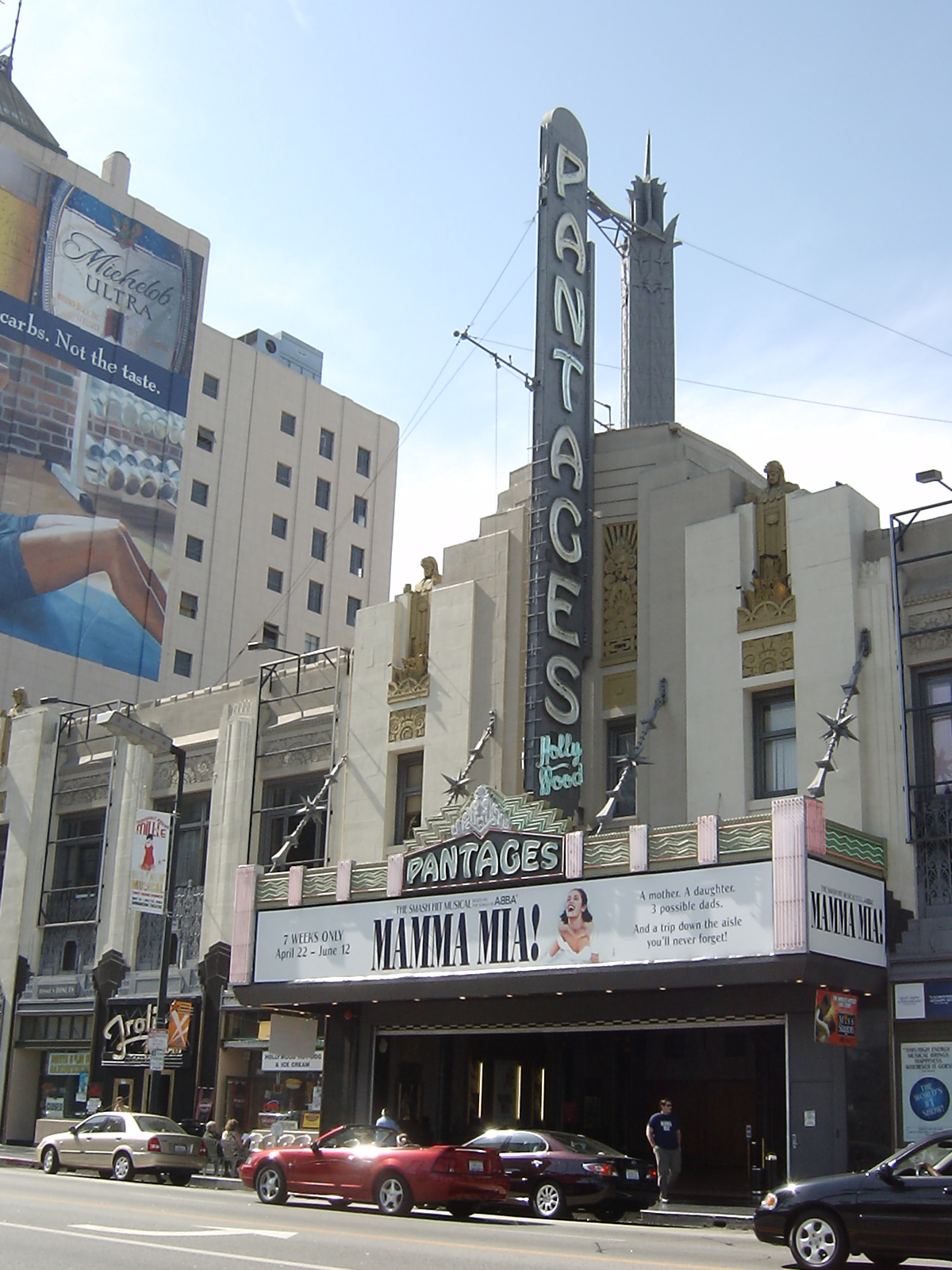
Priteca's Pantages Theater in Hollywood

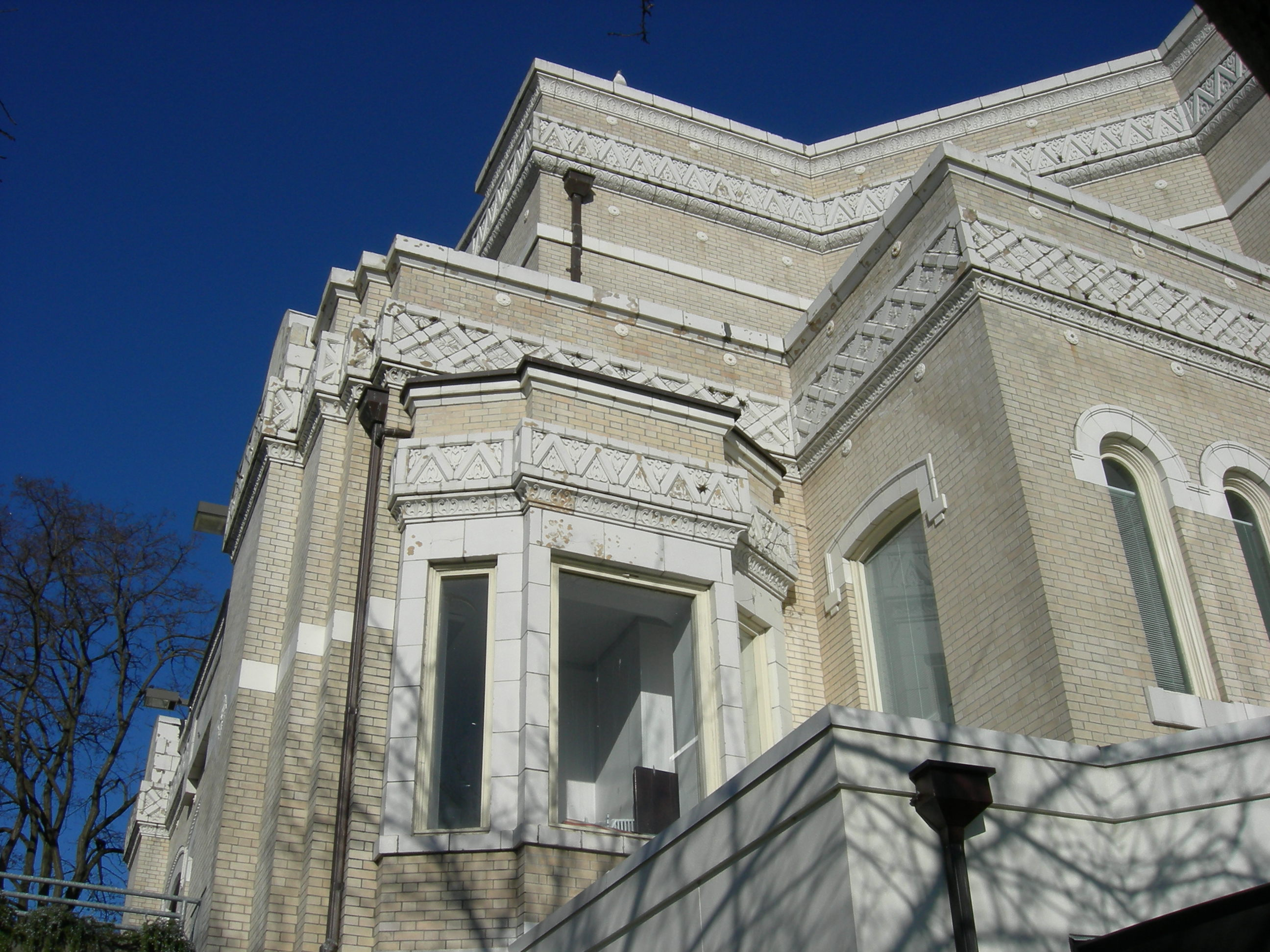
Detail of Priteca's Chevra Bikur Cholim synagogue in Seattle, now the Langston Hughes Performing Art Center

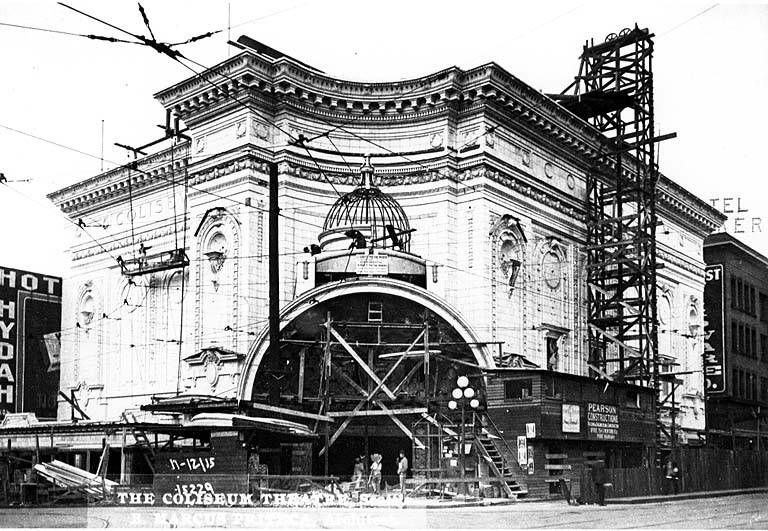
Coliseum Theatre, Seattle under construction 1915

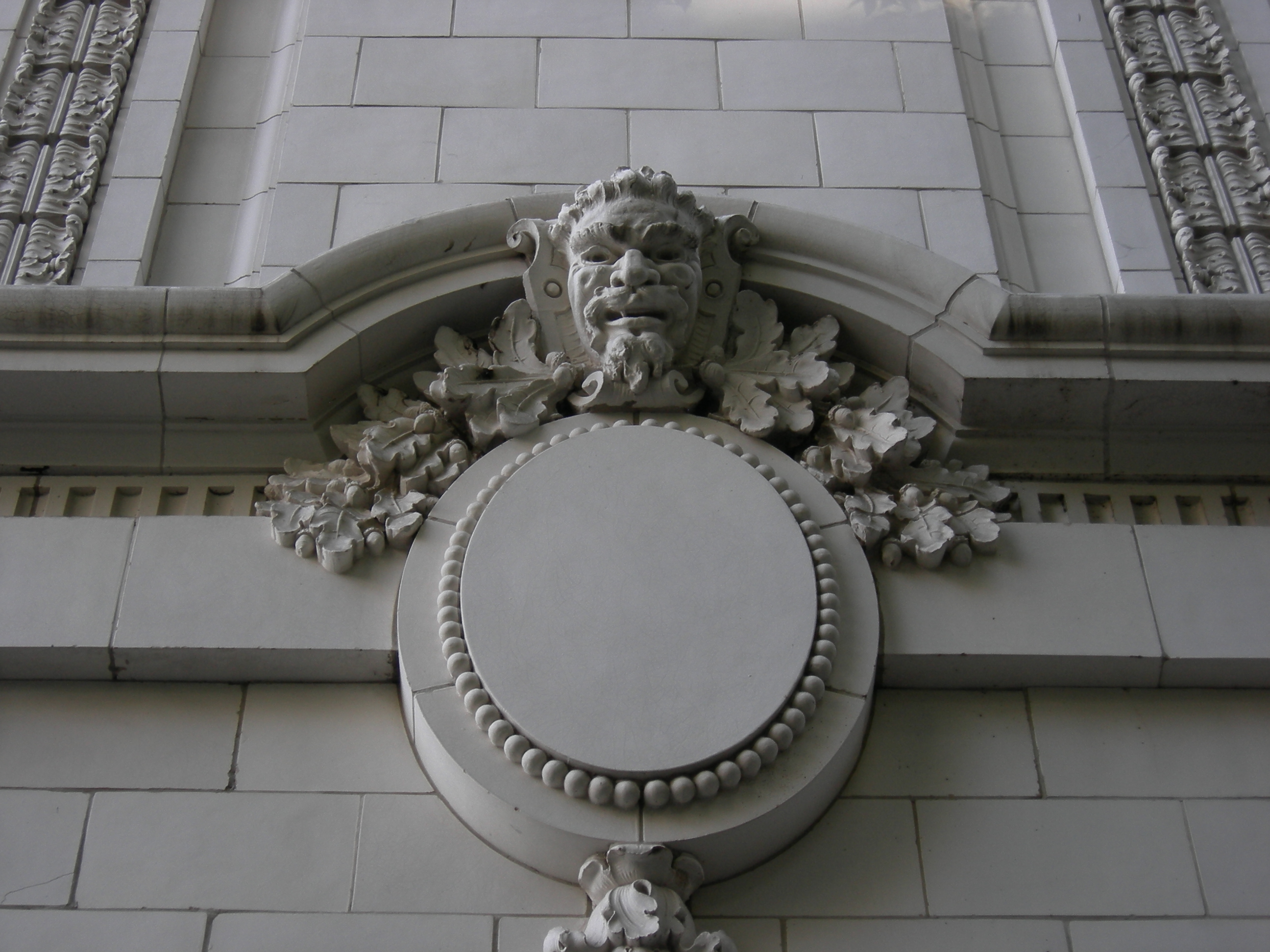
Terracotta Green Man, Coliseum Theatre, Seattle

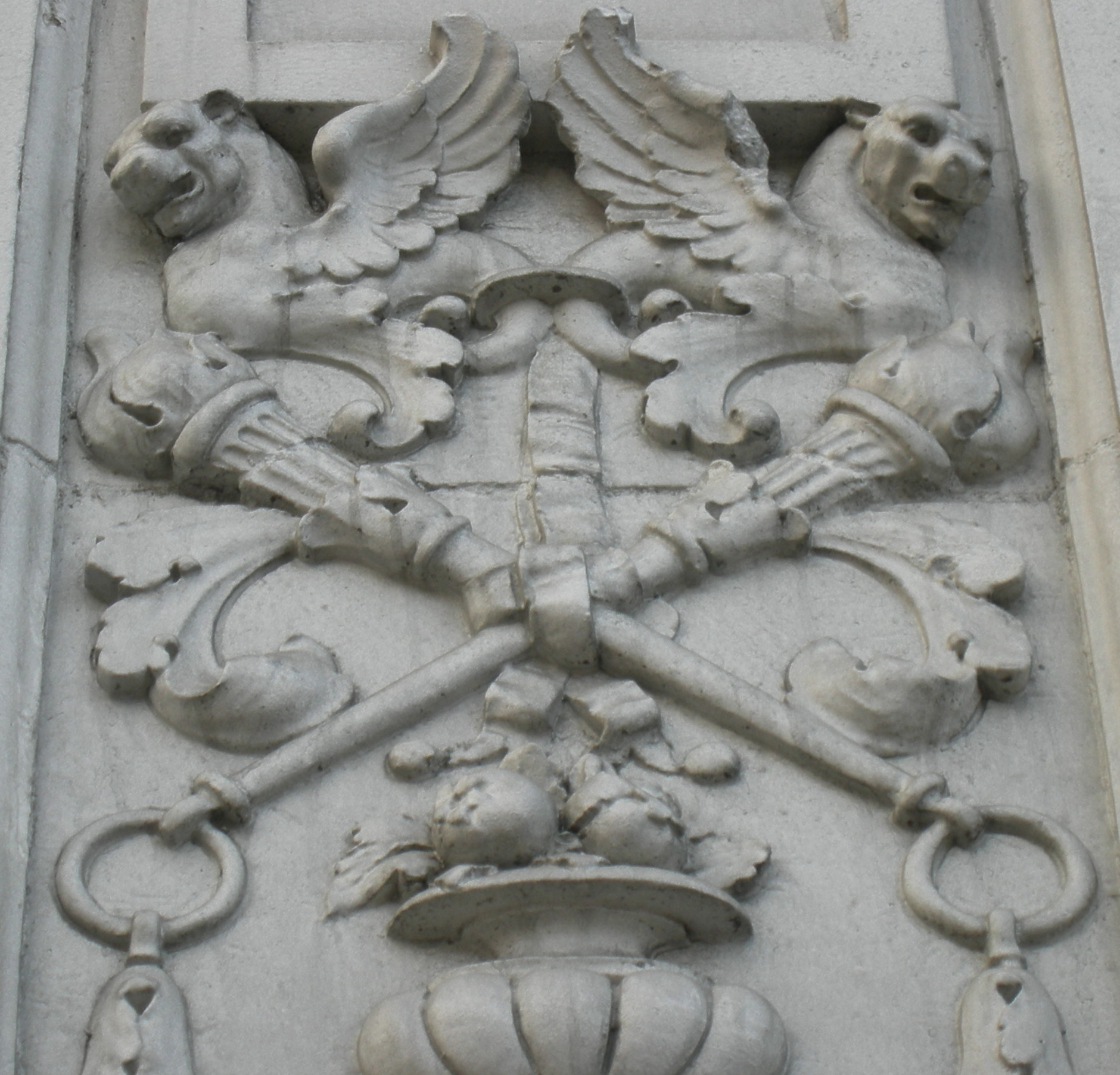
Terracotta Griffins, Crystal Pool, Seattle

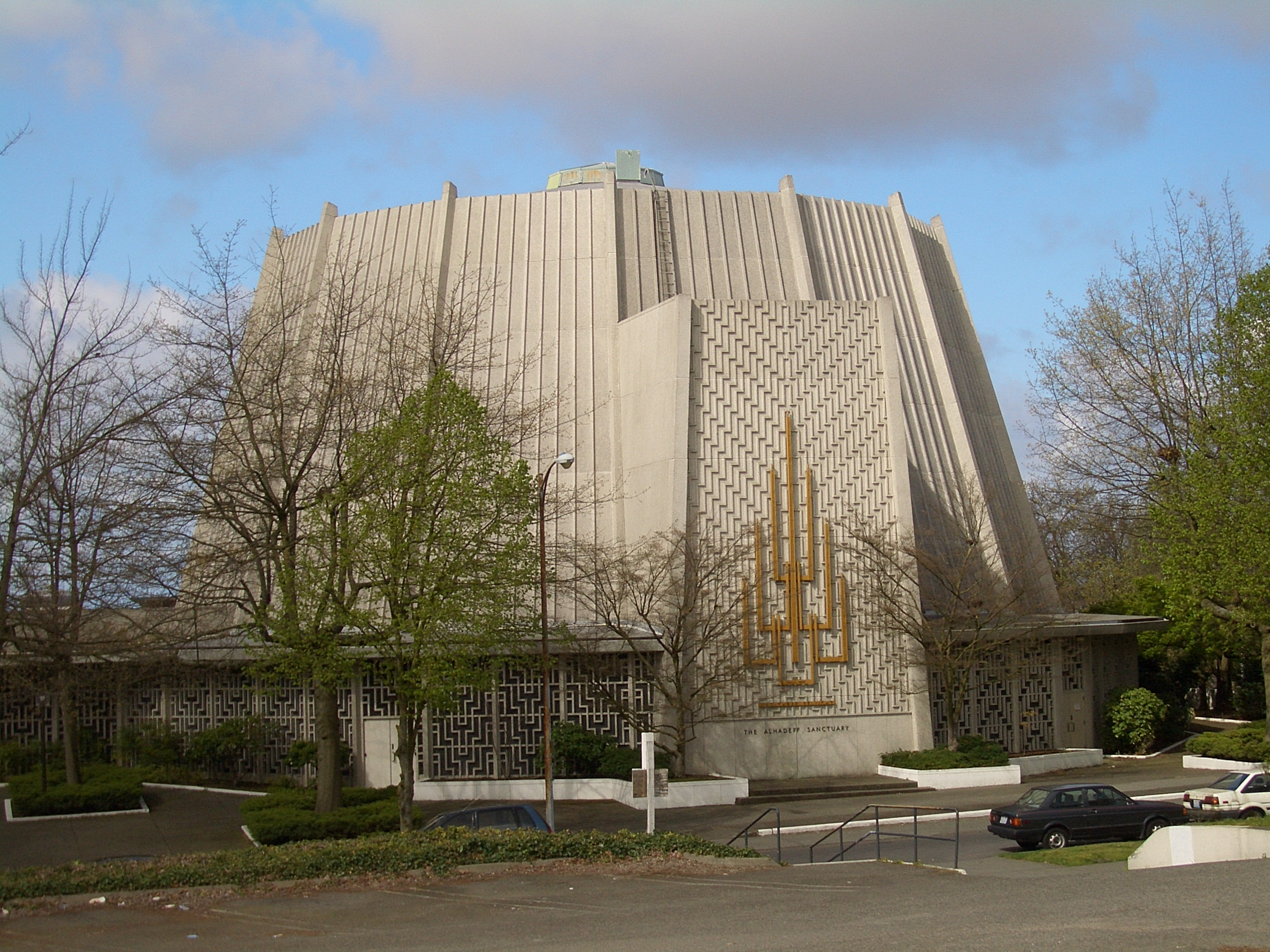
The Alhadeff Sanctuary of Seattle's Temple De Hirsch Sinai, a late Priteca project

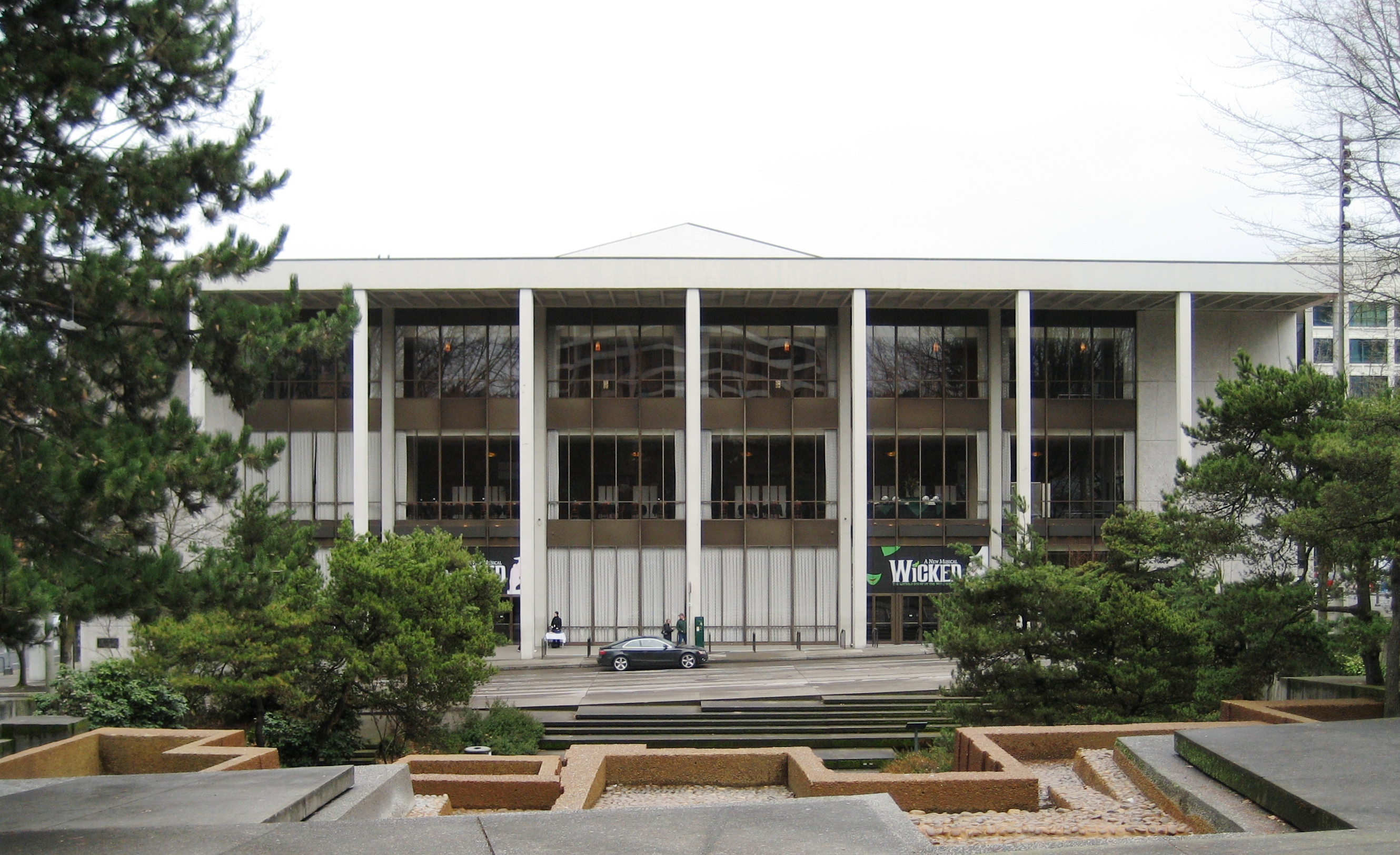
Civic Auditorium (now Keller Auditorium) in Portland

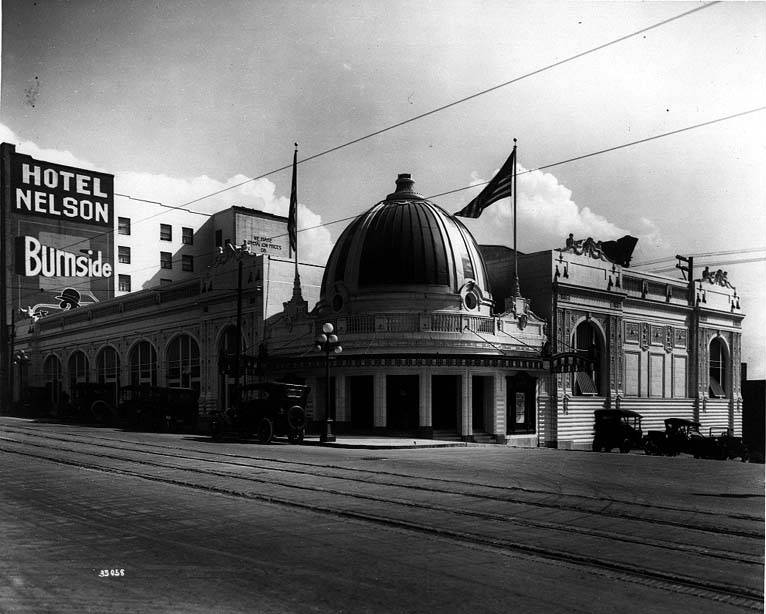
Seattle's Crystal Pool natatorium, 1916
