= Castle Airport =

Airport in Merced County, California, US

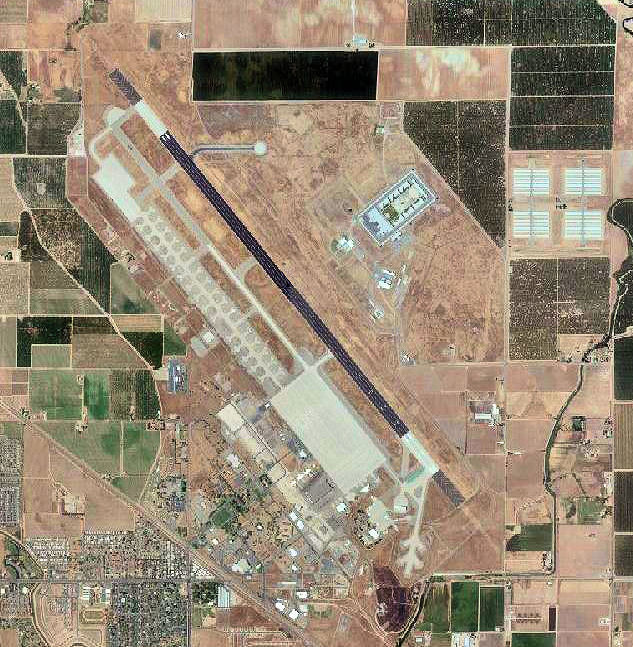
- 2006 USGS aerial photo

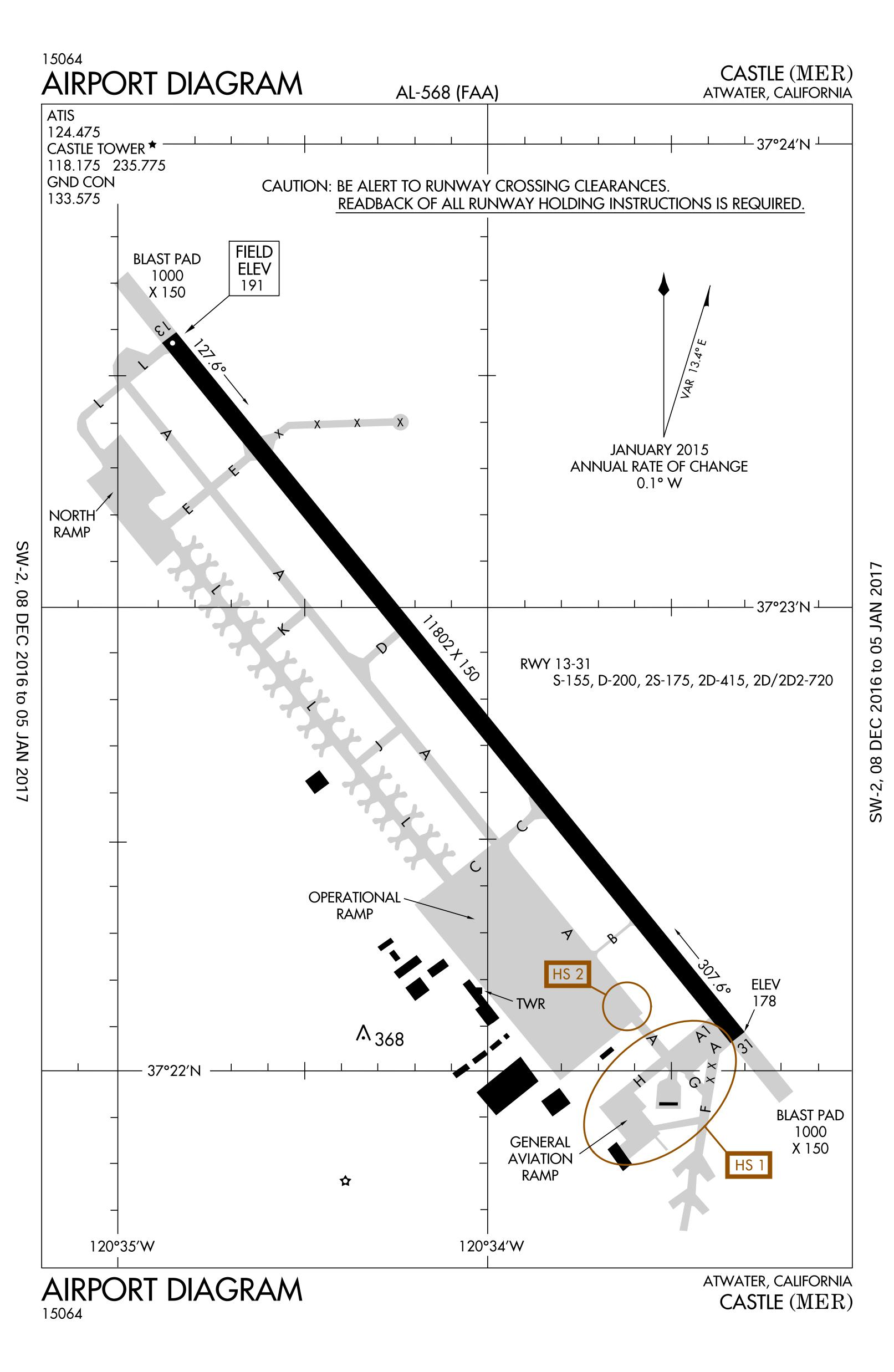
- IATA: MER; ICAO: KMER; FAA LID: MER

Summary
- Airport type: Public
- Owner: Merced County
- Operator: Merced County Department of Commerce, Aviation, and Economic Development
- Location: Atwater, California
- Elevation AMSL: 191 ft (58 m)
- Coordinates: 37°22′50″N 120°34′05″W
- Website: www.flycastleairport.com

Map
- Location of airport in California/United States MER (the United States)

Runways
| Direction | Length | | Surface |
| Direction | ft | m | Surface |
|---|---|---|---|
| 13/31 | 11,802 | 3,597 | Asphalt/concrete |

Statistics (2019)
- Aircraft operations (year ending 5/30/2019): 103,363
- Based aircraft: 71
- Source: Federal Aviation Administration

Castle Airport (IATA: MER, ICAO: KMER, FAA LID: MER) is a public airport in unincorporated Merced County, California, 8 miles (13 km) northwest of Merced. The airport is operated by the Merced County Department of Commerce, Aviation, and Economic Development. It is owned jointly by the city of Merced, the city of Atwater, and Merced County. The airport was formerly designated as Castle Air Force Base (1941–1995), a United States Air Force Strategic Air Command base which was closed after the end of the Cold War in 1995.

The Federal Aviation Administration's National Plan of Integrated Airport Systems for 2017–2021 categorized it as a general aviation airport, serving a regional role. The United States Department of Commerce designates the airport and its hangars, warehouses, industrial buildings, and distribution facilities as a Foreign-Trade Zone. The United States Forest Service uses Castle Airport as reloading base for aerial firefighting, its large runway, aprons, and taxiways being able to accommodate any aircraft in the Forest Service inventory.

Castle Airport serves as the headquarters for the Sierra Academy of Aeronautics, which specializes in training foreign pilots, primarily from the People's Republic of China. Activity related to this school makes up the majority of the air traffic at Castle. In early 2007, the control tower was reopened to handle increased training traffic.

Adjacent to the airport, Castle Air Museum displays over 60 restored World War II, Vietnam, and Cold War era aircraft. Among the exhibit highlights are a Lockheed SR-71 Blackbird, the world's fastest crewed aircraft, and the Convair RB-36 Peacemaker, the only surviving reconnaissance variant of the largest bomber ever built for the United States Air Force.

== Facilities ==
Castle Airport covers 1,360 acres (2.13 sq mi; 5.50 km^{2}) and has one paved runway:

- 13/31: 11,802 ft × 150 ft (3,597 m × 46 m), asphalt/concrete

There are four instrument approach procedures: one instrument landing system (ILS) approach, two Global Positioning System approaches (GPS) and one VOR/DME approach. GPS approaches are set up on each runway. Runway 31 is the only runway with an ILS approach and a VOR/DME approach.

=== Traffic ===
In the year ending May 30, 2019, the airport had 103,363 aircraft operations, an average of 283 per day: 99% general aviation, <1% military, and <1% air taxi. 71 aircraft were then based at this airport: 53 single-engine, 16 multi-engine, and 2 helicopter.

== Pollution ==
Since the mid-1940s, aircraft maintenance, fuel management, and fire training activities on the base have generated wastes that consist primarily of waste fuels, oils, solvents, and cleaners. Base activities also have generated lesser amounts of paints and plating wastes.

The EPA has this base listed on their database due to bulk wastes such as solvents, oils, fuels, and sludges which were disposed in pits at landfills around the base until 1977. Fuel and waste oils were incinerated by the Air Force during fire training exercises. The Air Force ceased disposal of hazardous waste on site in 1977, and the base was officially closed in 1995. During the following cleanup efforts, all hazardous and toxic materials that the Air Force was unwilling or unable to transport offsite were sealed into four onsite landfills.

EPA investigations have been completed at multiple areas of contamination including landfills, discharge areas, chemical disposal areas, fire training areas, fuel spill areas, and polychlorinated biphenyl (PCB) spill areas. Through the fiscal year 2006, $164.27 million was spent on cleanup activities at Castle. The USAF expects to spend an additional $70.98 million through fiscal year 2044. Approximately 6000 people obtain their drinking water from both municipal and private wells located near the site. The principal pollutant at the base, trichloroethylene (TCE), was found in a plume. Merced Irrigation purified the water at the edge of the plume and released the purified water outside the plume. Working their way inward, they managed to clean the contaminated water. The methods used to purify the groundwater included passing the water through carbon filters and then aerating it. The pollutant remaining after purification was packaged in a barrel and removed from the site. In 1991, a Base Realignment and Closure Cleanup Team was created to review and offer comments/recommendations on the progress of the cleanup effort at Castle. Membership included representatives from the Air Force, federal and state regulatory agencies, and appointed representatives from the governing bodies of surrounding communities. In 1994 a Restoration Advisory Board had been established on behalf of the former Castle Air Force Base, and reviewed Federal cleanup methods and efforts. It was officially adjourned on January 16, 2007.

== Air National Guard ==
In 2004, recommendations were made to relocate the 129th Rescue Wing (129 RQW) of the California Air National Guard and its associated HC-130, MC-130 and HH-60 aircraft from Moffett Federal Airfield (formerly Naval Air Station Moffett Field) to the former Castle Air Force Base, now Castle Airport. Rationale for this move was the high cost of living in the Sunnyvale/Mountain View/San Francisco Bay Area for full-time Active Guard and Reserve (AGR) and Air Reserve Technician (ART) personnel assigned to the unit, and the travel time and non-reimbursed expenses cost for "traditional" part-time air national guardsmen serving in the unit, most of whom reside in the San Joaquin Valley region due to lower cost of living.

It was estimated that the cost to relocate the 129 RQW to Castle, to include associated military construction (MILCON) costs, could be recouped in seven (7) years. This would result in the reestablishment of an Air Force cantonment area at Castle that would be renamed either Castle Air National Guard Base or Castle Air National Guard Station. However, likely due to organizational restructuring currently occurring in the Air National Guard nationwide and higher priority defense spending requirements for the U.S. Air Force, the National Guard Bureau and the Air National Guard since September 2001, this initiative has been placed on indefinite hold and the 129 RQW remains at Moffett.

== California High-Speed Rail ==
With its location on the route of the proposed California High-Speed Rail system, and with a large, underdeveloped site, Castle Airport has been submitted as a possible location for the central maintenance facility for the system.

== Accidents ==
- On September 19, 1979, a USAF Boeing KC-135 Stratotanker crashed during a touch-and-go exercise after a training flight. Five out of the 7 occupants were killed.

== See also ==
- Castle Air Museum
- United States Penitentiary, Atwater
- Riverside Motorsports Park, a proposed motorsports facility close to the airport
- California World War II Army Airfields
