= Riverside Motorsports Park =

Proposed entertainment complex in California

Coordinates: 37.3987°N 120.5577°W

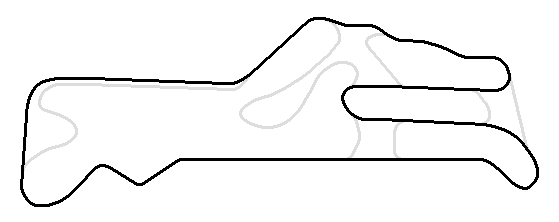

Riverside Motorsports Park was a proposed 1,200-acre (5 km^{2}), motorsports-themed family entertainment park to be built in Merced County, California. The name "Riverside Motorsports Park" was not derived from its location (which was miles from the nearest river). Instead, the name was derived from the configuration of the park's 3 1/2-mile Road Course, which would have replicated, as closely as possible (given current track safety requirements), the road course at the Riverside International Raceway (Riverside, California) that closed in 1989. The RMP site was next to the former Castle Air Force Base, which is now operated as Castle Airport.

== Project cancellation ==
In February 2008, a lawsuit filed against RMP and Merced County by the Merced County Farm Bureau and three environmental groups resulted in the cancellation of the park's 2006 construction approval.

The suit alleged that the county violated the California Environmental Quality Act when the Board of Supervisors approved plans for RMP in December 2006. The groups claimed the county failed to adequately study how the project would affect the environment.

On July 15, 2009, track officials told investors that RMP had "ceased operations", citing that the property was in foreclosure and that the company owed more money on the property than what it was worth at the time.

== Project scope ==
The park would have featured multiple racetracks for every form of automobile, truck, motorcycle and kart racing. With multiple venues, the facility would have offered simultaneous, weekend-long motorsports events, meeting the needs of professional and club racing sanctioning organizations across the United States. The Park would have been a landscaped environment complete with RV facilities, picnic grounds, family restaurants, video and game arcades, playgrounds, and clean, attended restrooms. In addition to motorsports events, the park would have featured technical motorsports schools, music concerts, car shows, and business center events.

=== Proposed tracks ===
- 3.2-mile (5.1 km) multi-configuration road course (closely resembling the former Riverside International Raceway in Riverside, California)
- World class 7/8-mile paved oval speedway
- Integrated 1/3 and 1/2 mile paved oval tracks
- 1/4 mile; 5,000-foot (1,500 m) dragstrip
- World class 3/4 mile karting course
- 1-mile (2 km) off-road circuit
- 3/8 mile dirt oval track
- 1/2 mile motocross course, with integrated 1/8 mile BMX track

== RMP founders and supporters ==
The Riverside Motorsports Park, LLC was founded in 2000 by John Condren, an entrepreneur and businessman whose background also includes more than 30 years in amateur and professional motorsports racing. The Riverside Motorsports Park development proposal was submitted to Merced County in August 2003, approved for development in December 2006, and cancelled in February 2008. Condren was the subject of a feature article in the Merced Sun-Star's January 27, 2007 issue. The Sun-Star reported that Condren's biographical information on the RMP website was exaggerated. The Sun-Star also reported that Condren had a history of bankruptcies and unpaid debts.

In April 2007, the 1989 NASCAR Premier Series Champion, Rusty Wallace, joined the project to provide track design enhancement engineering to the eight world-class motorsports venues within the RMP facility.

Wallace commented:

"Riverside Motorsports Park is definitely one of the most distinctive design concepts in recent motorsports history, and ... definitely a project with which I am very excited to join forces."

The project also had the support of Stone & Youngberg LLC (San Francisco, California), the Fluor Corporation (Aliso Viejo, California), Granite Construction Company (Watsonville, California), Golden Valley Engineering (Merced, California), Rex Moore Electric (Sacramento, California), and Wood Rodgers Engineering (Sacramento).

The Environmental Impact Report (EIR), completed in compliance with the California Environmental Quality Act (CEQA) and certified by the Merced County (Calif.) Board of Supervisors in December 2006, was completed by EDAW, Inc. (Sacramento). Architectural engineering (including racetrack design) was being coordinated by Paxton Waters, AIA (Carmel, Indiana), with additional racetrack engineering support from Alan Wilson (Monument, Colorado).

== See also ==
- Riverside International Raceway
- Castle Airport
