= The Mainzer =

Restaurant and theater in Merced, California

Coordinates: 37°18′9.09″N 120°29′10.32″W

The Mainzer lit up at night.

The Mainzer (pronounced MINE-Zer), also known as The Mainzer Theater or The Mainzer-Strand Theater, is a restaurant and entertainment center in downtown Merced, California, serving daily dinner service, weekday happy hour, and weekend brunch. Mainzer stands proudly in the center of downtown Merced and has for many decades. The historic building has been renovated and now includes a full restaurant, bar, game room, cinema, and theater. Its renovation was recognized by the Art Deco Society of California for the 1999 restoration.

== History ==
The building was constructed in the early 1920s. Around 1931 there was a fire that destroyed a good portion of the interior. The theater has been owned by Golden State Theaters, United California Theaters, and then United Artists. The building was originally a theater for live stage performances. At the time, it was known as The Strand Theater. After years of declining business, the theater became a second-run house, playing old Hollywood blockbusters at discounted rates, again, with little success. Finally the theater was shut down due to lack of business in the mid 1990s. The building remained untouched for years until an investment group headed by Hanz Mainz and Brenda Farley bought the property and started the renovation process.

During renovations, the theater was renamed The Mainzer-Strand Theater, with the marquee reading "The Mainzer." The interior of the building was changed by tearing out one of the movie cinemas and adding a large room with a balcony and a stage for all types of events. A small café was installed in the front lobby area. It was the hope of the investors to be able to hold large stage productions, concerts, comedy shows, private receptions, and show independent films in the two remaining cinemas.

In 1999, The Mainzer reopened to a large gala, bringing Comedy Acts, Jazz and Reggae to the main stage. The two theaters hosted many independent films including A Waking Life and My Big Fat Greek Wedding. The theater became a mainstay for a film club devoted to culture, popcorn and wine. The front of house hosted a delightful deli with homemade German potato salad, fine espresso and Gewürztraminer wine. Many Saturdays evenings Gerado Olvera (notable Butterfields Chef turned Cinema Cafe owner) would host pop-up gourmet dinners under the marquee, allowing guest to enjoy the community of arts, culture and fine dining. A group of young artist worked for Hans and Brenda which included their two daughters (Bernadette and Bridgette), and locals Sarah Shirrel, Amber Kirby, and Callan Thornhill who helped open the doors to create the culture and scene of what The Mainzer would become for the youth at the time. Many others would grow their talents under the Mainzer marquee as projectionists, baristas, DJ’s, actors, poets, musicians, event promoters, bookers and visual artists. Brenda Farley welcomed many to make The Mainzer their home. In 2004 the Art Deco Society of California gave The Mainzer its "Historic Preservation" award for the recent renovations.

Despite The Mainzer’s local popularity and home-brewed scene, in late 2004, it became clear that the overhead for the massive building was outweighing profit and bankruptcy loomed overhead. In an effort to keep the scene alive, Brenda Farley reached out to Sarah Shirrel (employee and burgeoning Chef) asking her to take over the business she knew she loved. Joining with Modesto Area Music Award winner Joey Essig (Joey No Knows, The Jabronskis, El Olio Wolof), Brian Strong (Local teacher and member of El Olio Wolof) and R.C. Essig, she leased the building from Brenda Farley. The team focused on their talents and The Mainzer stayed open for a short time as an independent music venue. Unfortunately, by fall of 2006, the owners filed bankruptcy and The Mainzer was shuttered.

The KISS Tribute band at The Mainzer Stage.

In 2017 Hyatt purchased The Mainzer Theater and remodeled the entirety of the building. Though Hyatt decided to keep the name of The Mainzer, they have chosen to ignore the seven year history of The Mainzer to the extent that they have chosen to pronounce it MANE-Zer instead of MINE-Zer. As well, they closed down The Cinema Cafe and turned the historical spot into a room for Skee ball machines.

In 2023, New Waterloo became the new management company for The Mainzer as a part of El Capitan Hotel. New Waterloo is a hospitality management company based out of Austin, TX. Mainzer now serves as a community hub as both a theater, restaurant, and entertainment center. It is open for daily dinner service, weekday happy hour, and weekend brunch in the heart of downtown Merced.

=== Local Culture ===
Sarah Macias of Abracadabra hosted Merceds first ever Women in The Arts Night at The Mainzer. The night brought together hundreds of women musicians, visual artist, poets and actors.

R.C. Essig, who worked at The Mainzer as a principal booking agent prior to leasing the building with Shirrel, Strong and Essig would go on to open The Partisan and the 17th Street Public House with Joey Essig, and Tim Williams. Vanessa Hoffman would later join the LLC. R.C. Essig was a recognized booking agent for his work in the Merced indie rock festival, The Gathering of Goodness. Due to this, Essig was able to book many of the same national acts at The Mainzer whenever they were touring California. The Mainzer had gained recognition as a good venue while in California.

While many people considered The Mainzer mainly an indie rock venue, it also held many shows in all genres of music from punk to metal to hip-hop.
