= Merced, California =

City in California, United States

- City
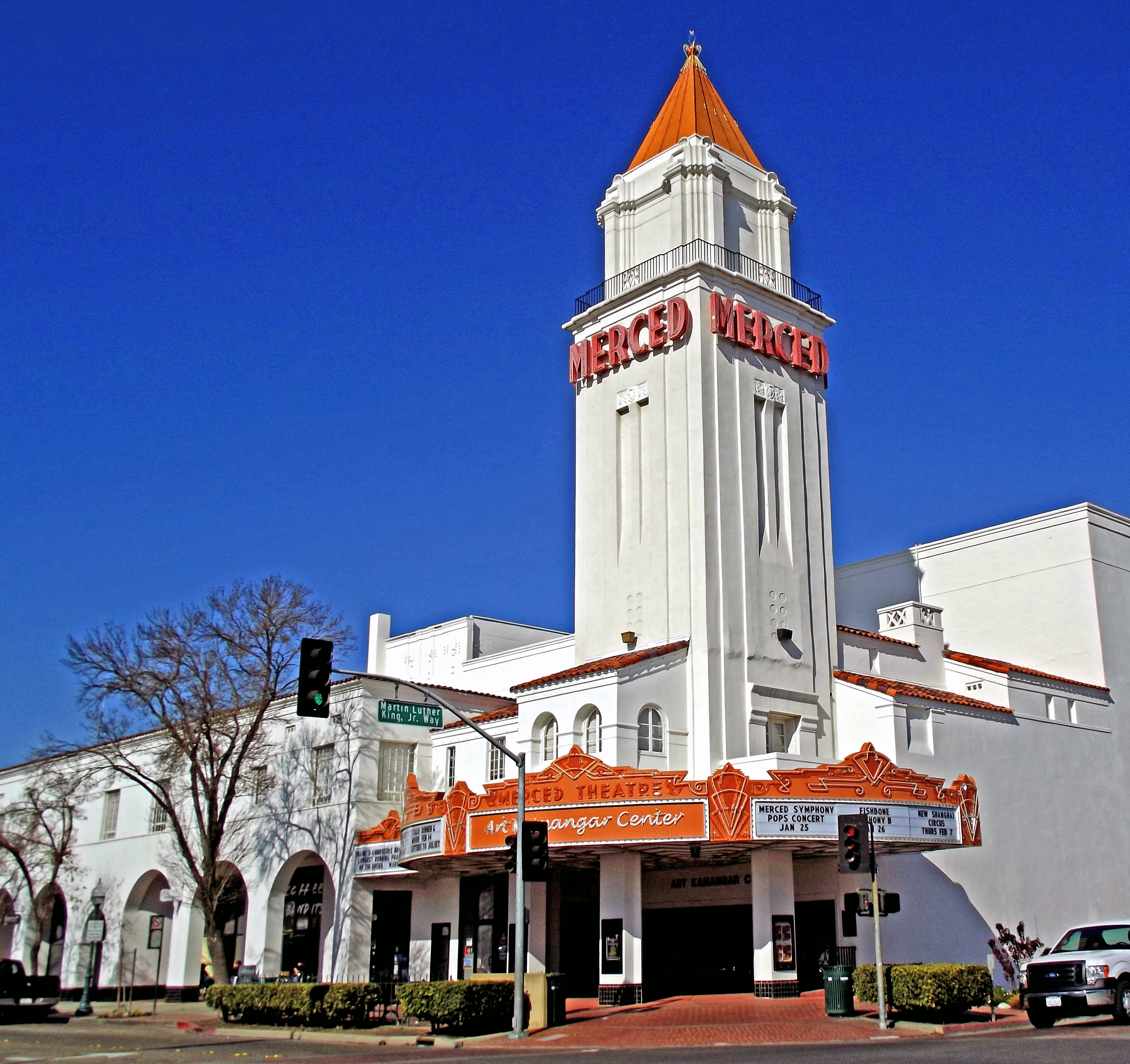
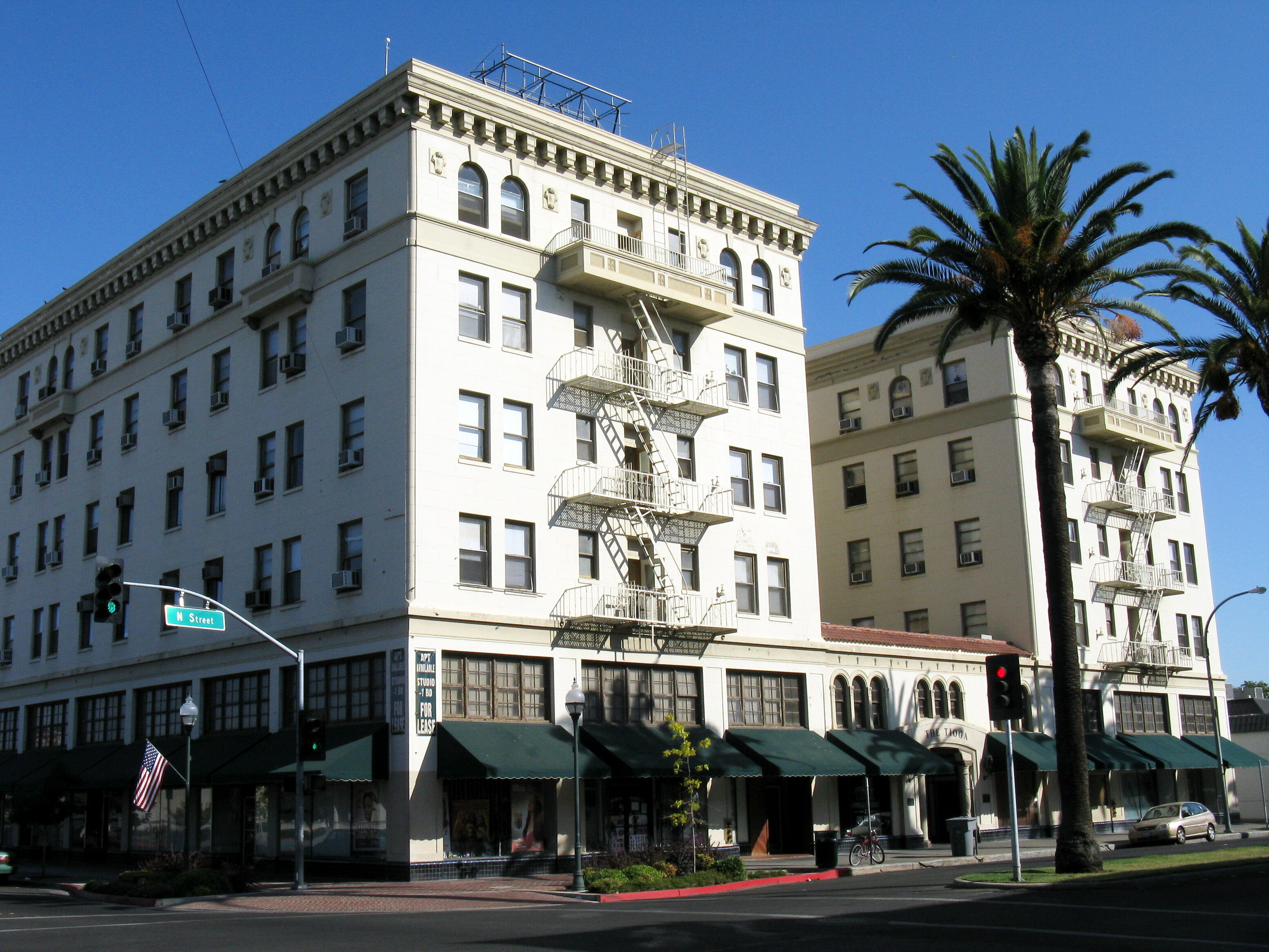
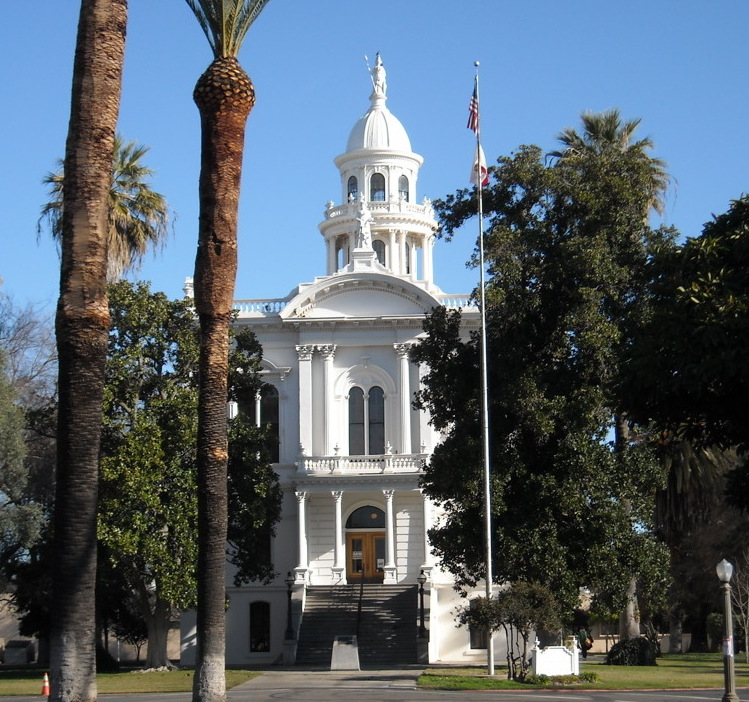
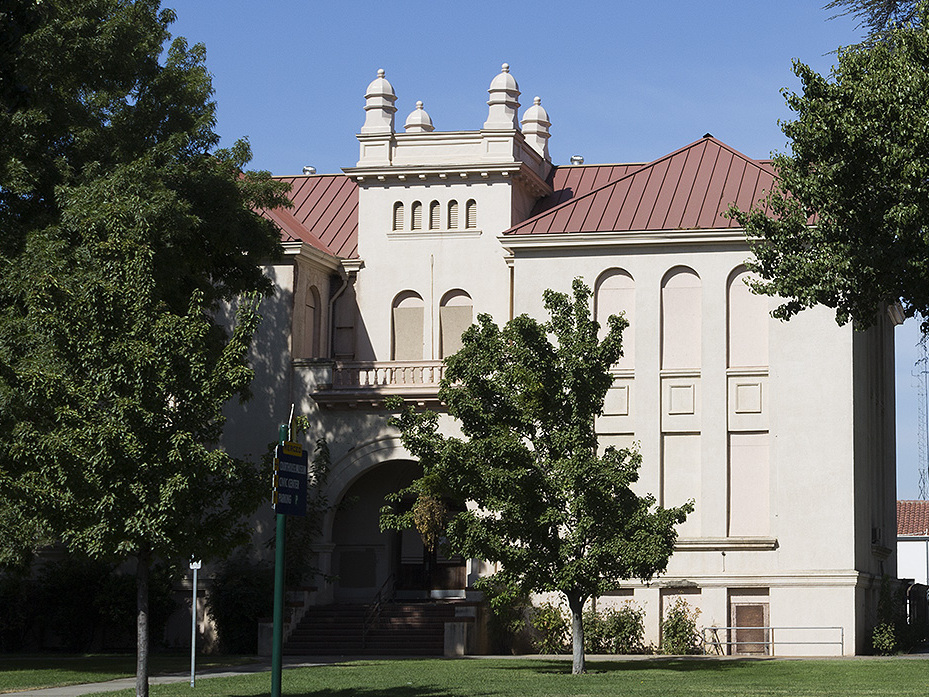
- Merced Theatre Tioga Hotel Merced County Courthouse Merced County High School

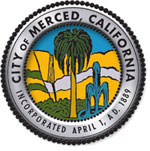
- Flag Seal
- Interactive map of Merced, California
- Location within California Location within the United States
- Coordinates: 37°18′N 120°29′W
- Country: United States
- State: California
- County: Merced
- Incorporated: April 1, 1889

Government
  - Type: Council–manager
  - Mayor: Matthew Serratto
  - State senator: Anna Caballero (D)
  - Assemblymember: Esmeralda Soria (D)
  - U.S. rep.: Adam Gray (D)

Area
  - Total: 23.25 sq mi (60.2 km^{2})
  - Land: 23.25 sq mi (60.2 km^{2})
  - Water: 0.00 sq mi (0 km^{2}) 0%
- Elevation: 171 ft (52 m)

Population (2020)
  - Total: 86,333
  - Rank: 80th in California
  - Density: 3,712.61/sq mi (1,433.45/km^{2})
- Time zone: UTC−08:00 (PST)
  - Summer (DST): UTC−07:00 (PDT)
- ZIP codes: 95340–95341, 95344, 95348
- Area code: 209
- FIPS code: 06-46898
- GNIS feature IDs: 1659751, 2411080
- Website: www.cityofmerced.gov

Merced (/mɜːrˈsɛd/ mur-SED; from Spanish for 'Mercy', pronounced [meɾˈseð]) is a city in and the county seat of Merced County, California, United States, in the San Joaquin Valley. As of the 2020 census, the city had a population of 86,333, up from 78,958 in 2010. Incorporated on April 1, 1889, Merced is a charter city that operates under a council–manager government. It is named after the Merced River, which flows nearby.

Merced, known as the "Gateway to Yosemite", is less than two hours by automobile from Yosemite National Park to the east and Monterey Bay, the Pacific Ocean, and multiple beaches to the west. The community is served by the passenger rail service Amtrak, a minor, heavily subsidized airline through Merced Regional Airport, and three bus lines. It is approximately 110 miles (180 km) from Sacramento, 130 miles (210 km) from San Francisco, 55 miles (89 km) from Fresno, and 270 miles (430 km) from Los Angeles.

In 2005, the city became home to the 10th University of California campus, University of California, Merced (UC Merced), the first research university built in the U.S. in the 21st century.

== History ==
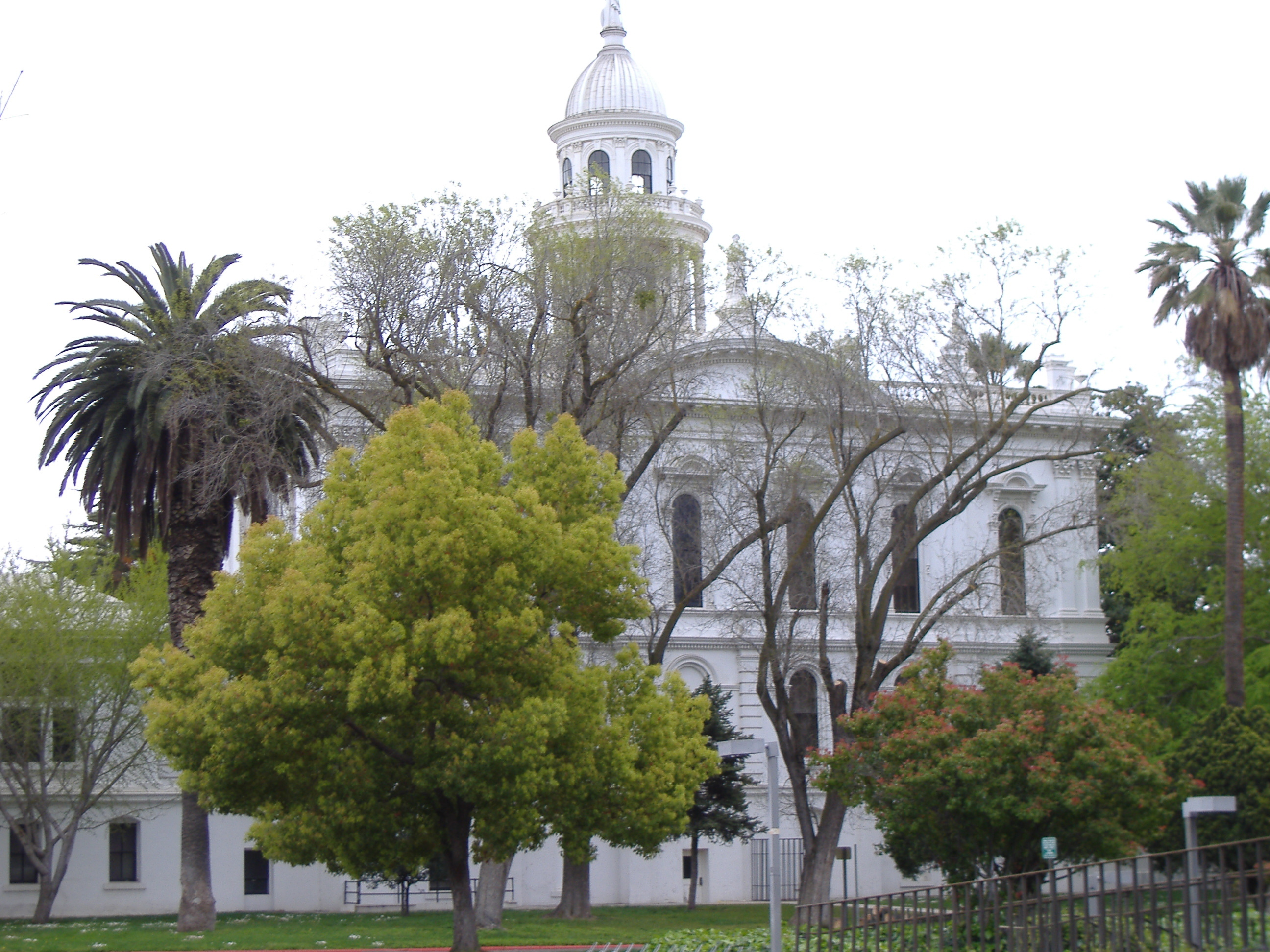
The historic Merced County Courthouse, built in 1875.

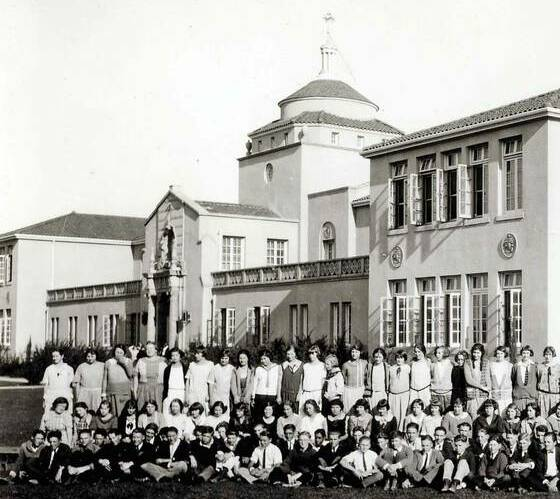
The original Spanish Revival style Merced High School, demolished 1974

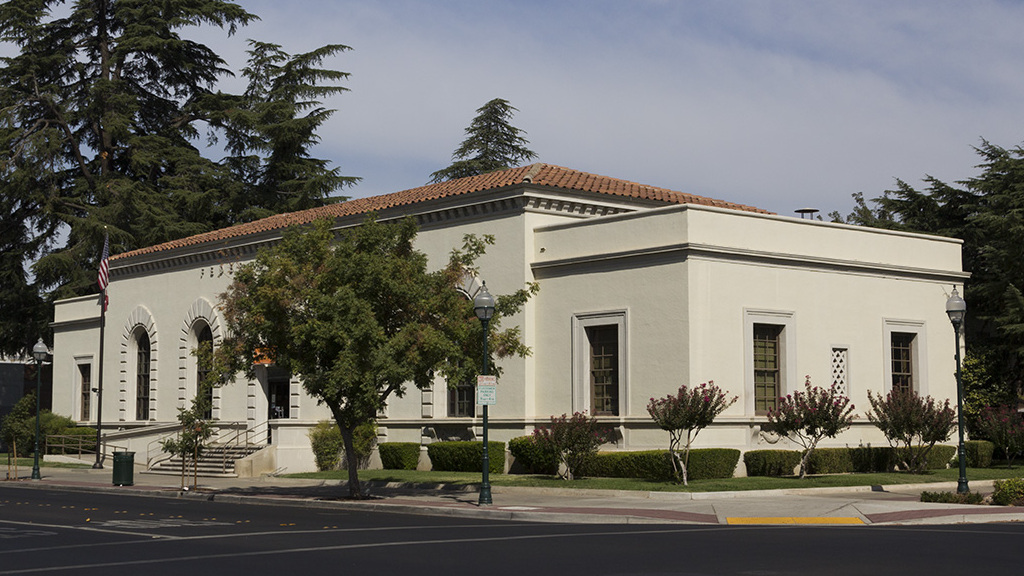
The Merced Post Office was built in 1933 in a Spanish Colonial Revival style by architects Allison & Allison.

The first Merced post office opened in 1870. Merced incorporated in 1889.

During World War II, the Merced County fairgrounds were the site of a temporary "assembly center" where Japanese Americans were detained after being removed from their West Coast homes under Executive Order 9066. 4,669 men, women and children from central California (with most coming from Merced County) were confined in the Merced Assembly Center from May 6 to September 15, 1942, when they were transferred to the more permanent Granada internment camp in Colorado.

Since 2005, Merced has been home to the University of California, Merced. Historic cultural attractions in the city include The Mainzer Theater which is known for its historic and architectural value, the County Courthouse Museum c. 1889, the Merced Multicultural Arts Center and the County Library.

Also within a short distance from the city limits are the Castle Air Museum, Lake Yosemite, and Merced Falls. The city of Merced along with its surrounding cities are serviced by the Merced Sun-Star and the Merced County Times. The Merced Sun-Star daily newspaper has a circulation of 14,219 daily and 18,569 Saturday in the Merced area. The paper was sold to U.S. Media in 1985 and was acquired by The McClatchy Company in January 2004.

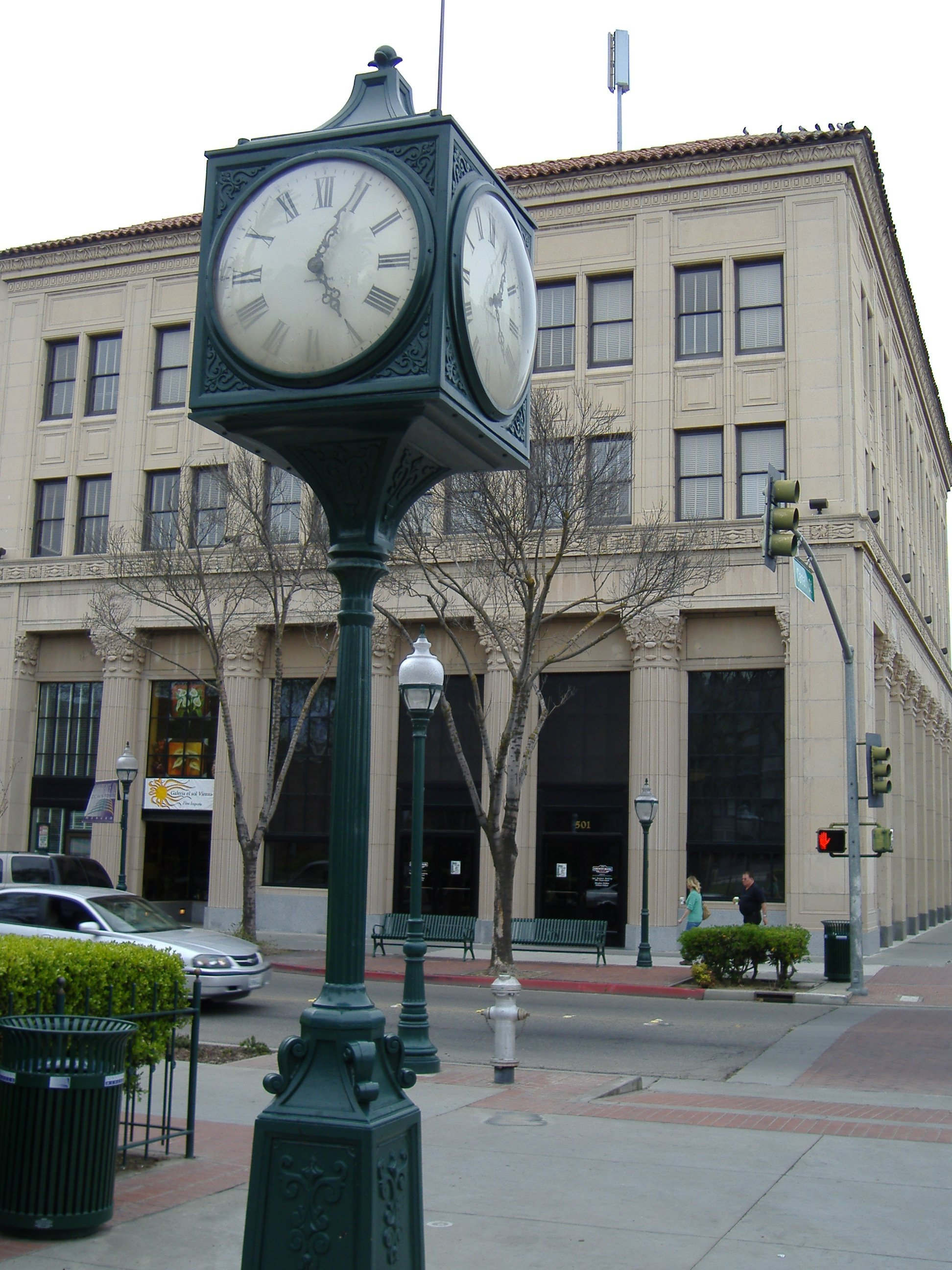
Bob Hart Square

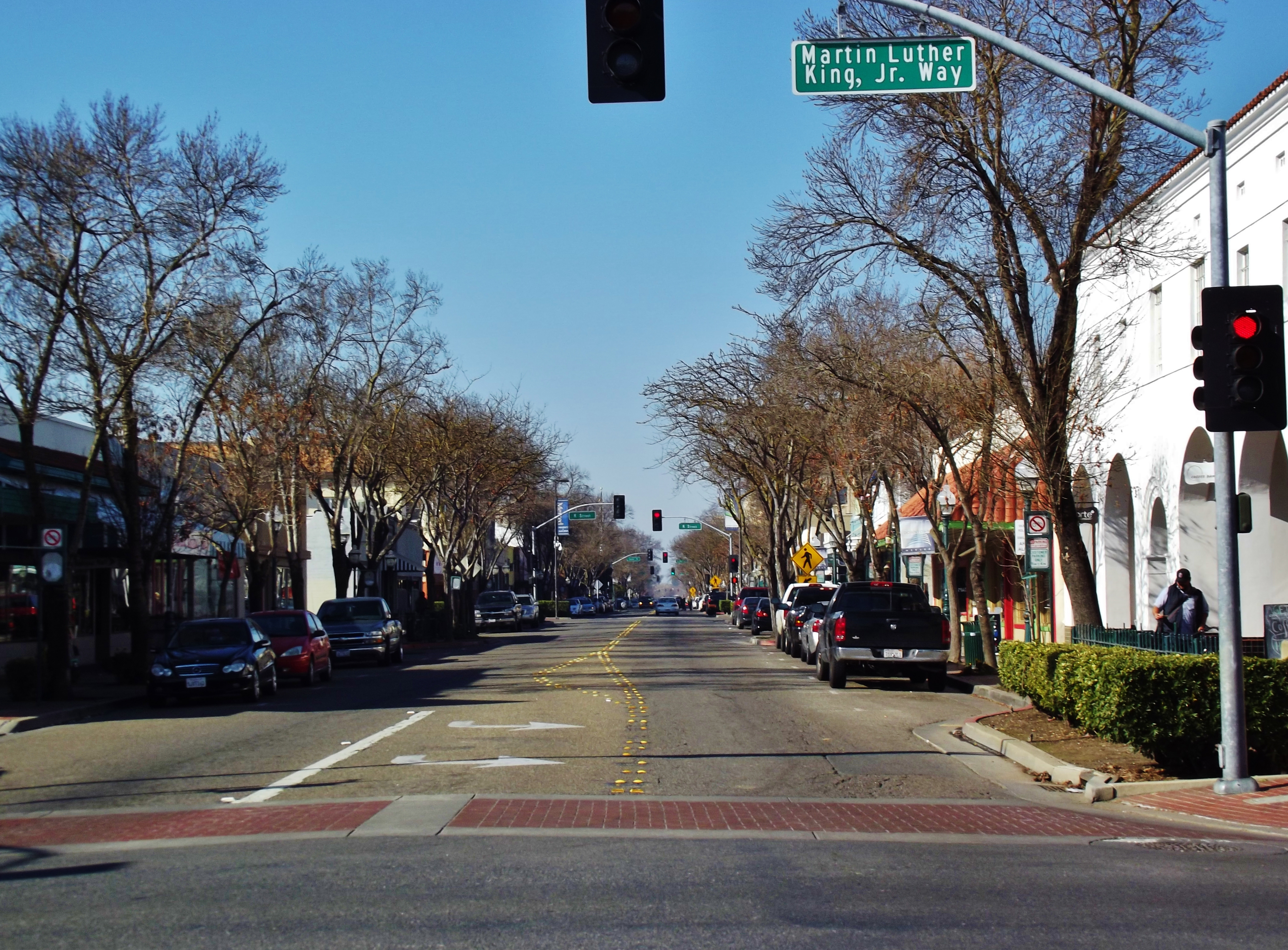
Main Street in Merced, California

Homes at the median level in Merced had lost 62% of their value from the second quarter of 2006, when they peaked at $336,743, the biggest drop anywhere in the country. Home prices have since rebounded, with the median sale price in April 2018 at $247,000 and stabilizing at around $400,000 in February, 2022 through January 2026. Investors from outside of the Valley were helping to drive up home prices.

The metro area went to a 14.2% unemployment rate in December 2013. Having since recovered to a rate of 8.7% in April 2018. Some efforts have been directed towards diversifying its economy and are showing a lowering trend in the overall unemployment rate, according to the Bureau of Labor Statistics.

Cinema, Merced, California; photographed by John Margolies in 2003

During the Great Recession Merced suffered one of the greatest property price collapses in the country and house prices at the end of 2009 had fallen to 1998 levels, according to Zillow, making housing affordable compared to many other California locations.

The economy has traditionally relied upon agribusiness and upon the presence of Castle Air Force Base. Over the past few twenty years, more diversified industry has entered the area, including printing, fiberglass boat building, warehousing and distribution, and packaging industries.

In September 1995, Castle Air Force Base closed after phasing down over the previous three years. This affected residential real estate and some sectors of the retail and service economies, but overall retail continued to increase. Industrial development is increasing in the area. It is now known as the Castle Airport Aviation and Development Center. The Castle Air Museum remains at the site.

== Geography ==
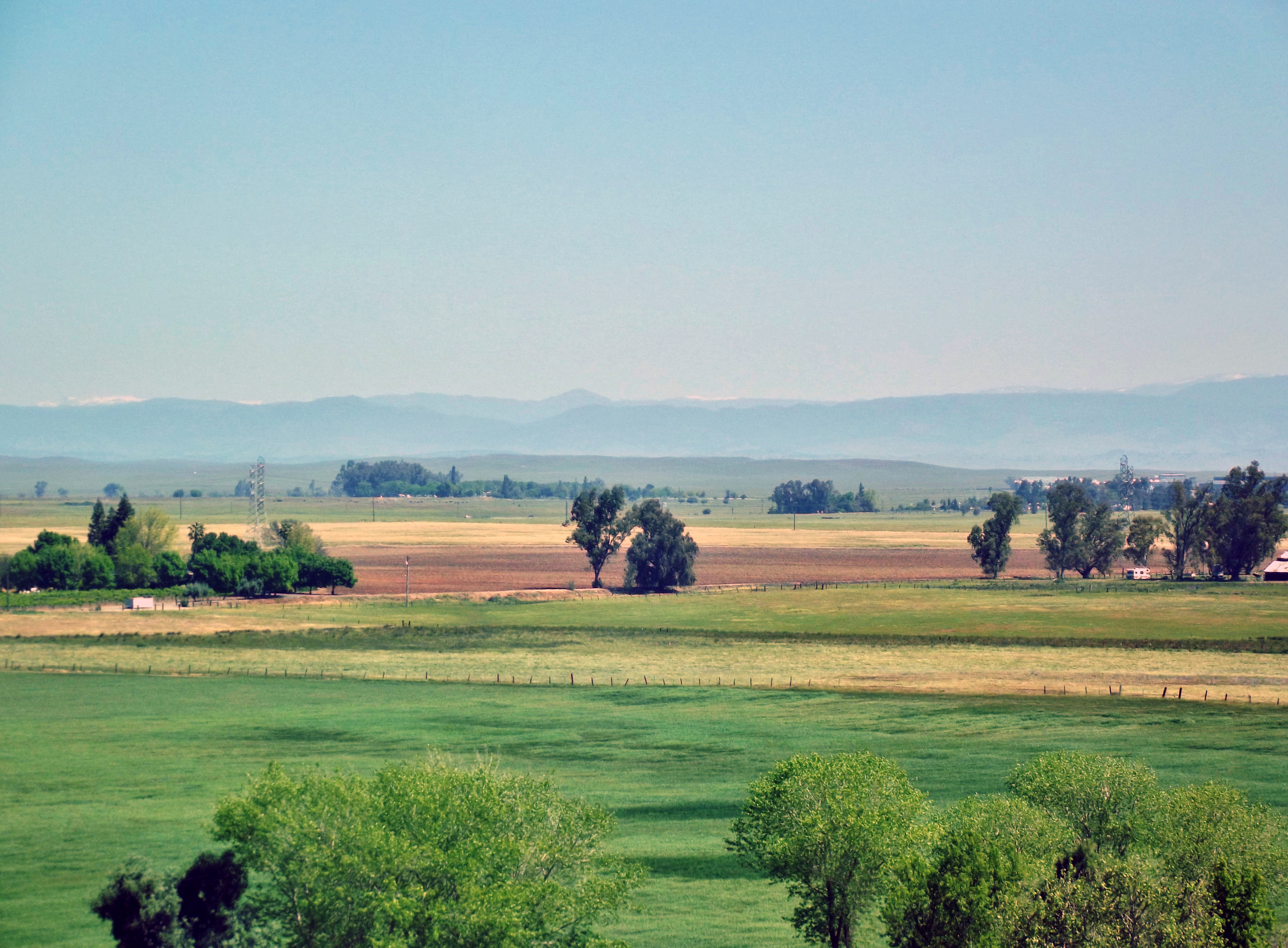
Merced County countryside

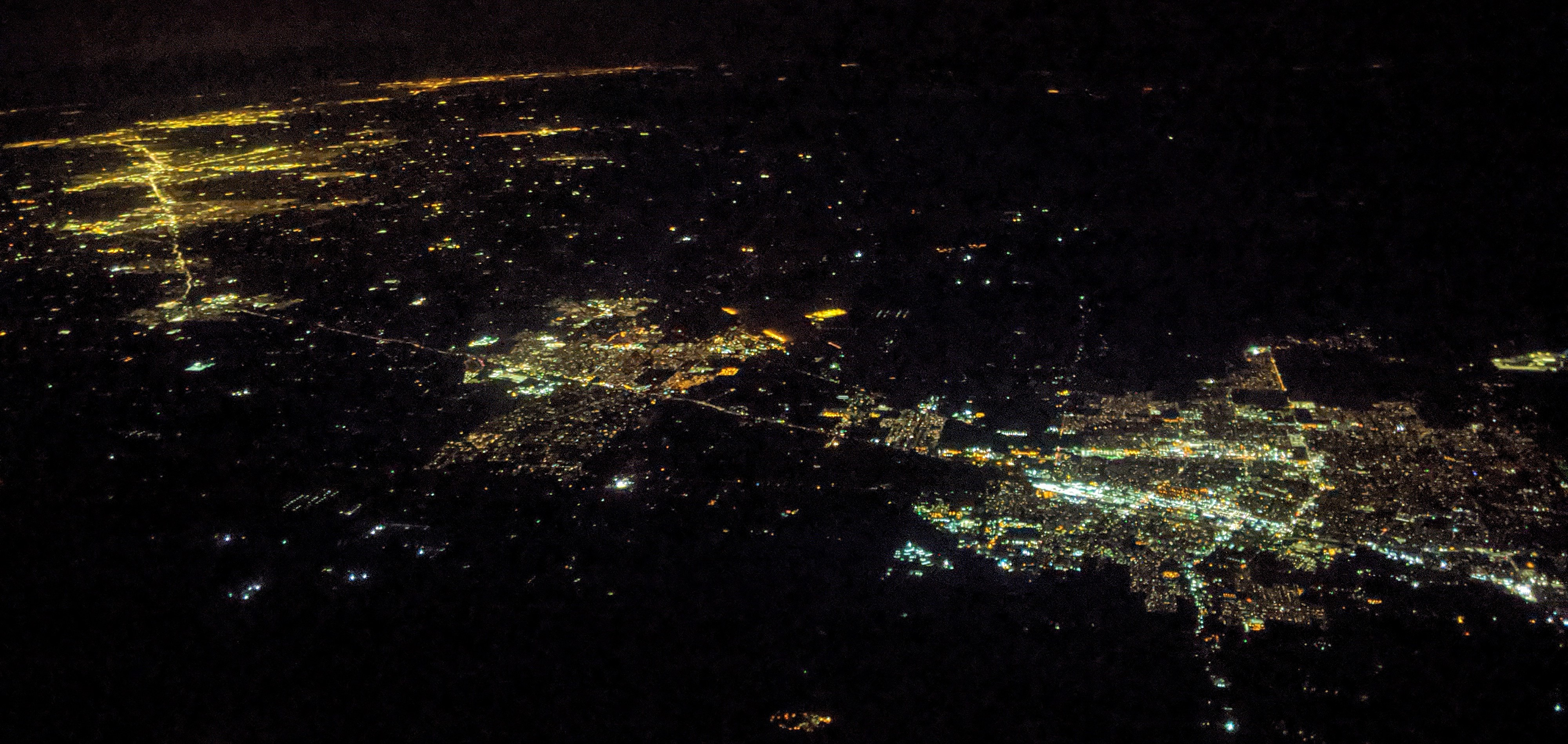
Night aerial view of Merced, Atwater, etc. in 2019

According to the United States Census Bureau, the city has a total area of 23.3 square miles (60 km^{2}), all land.

Merced is approximately 110 miles (180 km) southeast of San Francisco and 275 miles (443 km) northwest of Los Angeles.

A major groundwater plume containing the contaminant PCE was discovered in Merced in 1987. Subsequently, drilling of new water wells was severely restricted.

=== Climate ===
Merced has a cool semi-arid climate (Köppen: BSk), with its annual precipitation falling just short of a mediterranean climate. The city features hot to sweltering, dry summers and mild, damp winters. There are an average of 99.7 days with highs of 90 °F (32.2 °C) or higher and an average of 27.8 days with lows of 32 °F (0 °C) or lower. The record highest temperature of 116 °F (46.7 °C) was recorded on September 6, 2022. The record lowest temperature of 15 °F (−9.4 °C) was recorded on December 24, 1990.

The wettest "rain year" was from July 1982 to June 1983 with 23.90 inches or 607.1 millimeters and the driest from July 2013 to June 2014 with 4.97 inches or 126.2 millimeters. The most rainfall in one month was 8.00 inches or 203.2 millimeters in January 1909. The most rainfall in 24 hours was 2.20 inches or 55.9 millimeters, which occurred on January 30, 1911 and March 9, 1911.

Climate data for Merced, California (Merced Regional Airport), 1991–2020 normals, extremes 1899–present
Month	Jan	Feb	Mar	Apr	May	Jun	Jul	Aug	Sep	Oct	Nov	Dec	Year
Record high °F (°C)	75 (24)	84 (29)	88 (31)	98 (37)	109 (43)	111 (44)	114 (46)	114 (46)	116 (47)	106 (41)	90 (32)	76 (24)	116 (47)
Mean maximum °F (°C)	65.9 (18.8)	71.8 (22.1)	79.7 (26.5)	89.4 (31.9)	97.3 (36.3)	103.9 (39.9)	105.5 (40.8)	104.9 (40.5)	101.7 (38.7)	92.5 (33.6)	78.2 (25.7)	66.1 (18.9)	107.0 (41.7)
Mean daily maximum °F (°C)	55.6 (13.1)	62.0 (16.7)	68.1 (20.1)	74.0 (23.3)	82.7 (28.2)	90.7 (32.6)	96.3 (35.7)	95.1 (35.1)	90.5 (32.5)	79.6 (26.4)	66.1 (18.9)	56.0 (13.3)	76.4 (24.7)
Daily mean °F (°C)	46.3 (7.9)	50.5 (10.3)	55.2 (12.9)	59.7 (15.4)	67.4 (19.7)	74.2 (23.4)	79.0 (26.1)	77.9 (25.5)	73.5 (23.1)	64.3 (17.9)	53.5 (11.9)	46.0 (7.8)	62.3 (16.8)
Mean daily minimum °F (°C)	37.0 (2.8)	39.1 (3.9)	42.3 (5.7)	45.4 (7.4)	52.1 (11.2)	57.6 (14.2)	61.7 (16.5)	60.6 (15.9)	56.5 (13.6)	49.0 (9.4)	40.8 (4.9)	36.0 (2.2)	48.2 (9.0)
Mean minimum °F (°C)	27.1 (−2.7)	29.9 (−1.2)	33.4 (0.8)	36.4 (2.4)	42.8 (6.0)	48.5 (9.2)	54.8 (12.7)	54.7 (12.6)	48.4 (9.1)	39.4 (4.1)	31.0 (−0.6)	26.8 (−2.9)	25.0 (−3.9)
Record low °F (°C)	16 (−9)	20 (−7)	20 (−7)	25 (−4)	30 (−1)	37 (3)	40 (4)	36 (2)	32 (0)	28 (−2)	21 (−6)	15 (−9)	15 (−9)
Average precipitation inches (mm)	2.37 (60)	2.20 (56)	1.82 (46)	1.12 (28)	0.55 (14)	0.12 (3.0)	0.00 (0.00)	0.00 (0.00)	0.05 (1.3)	0.64 (16)	1.02 (26)	1.91 (49)	11.80 (300)
Average precipitation days (≥ 0.01 in)	9.6	9.5	8.2	4.9	2.7	0.6	0.1	0.0	0.6	3.0	7.3	9.7	56.2
Source 1: NOAA
Source 2: National Weather Service

== Economy ==
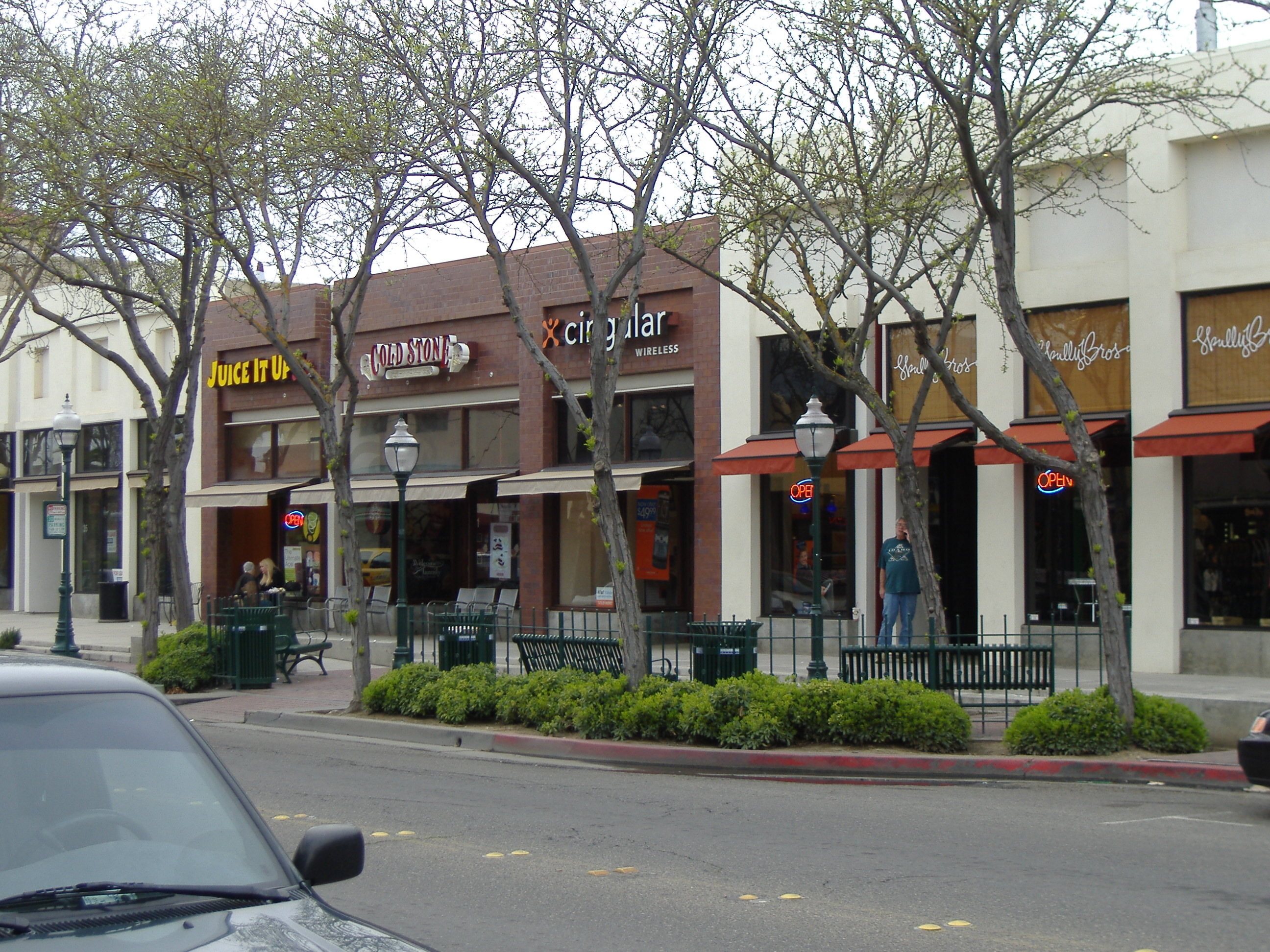
Storefronts in Downtown Merced

=== Top employers ===
According to the city's Official Website the top employers in the city are:

#	Employer	# of Employees
1	County of Merced	1980
2	University of California, Merced	1910
3	Merced City School District	1300
~~4~~	~~AT&T Call Center~~ (Closed 2014)	~~1,200~~
5	Merced Union High School District	890
6	Merced College	800
7	Quad Graphics	700
8	City of Merced	480
9	Scholle Corporation	370
10	WalMart	290

In the summer of 2014, the Castle Commerce Center's call center closed, subtracting 400 jobs from AT&T's share of employment.

=== Agriculture ===
Merced is ranked as the sixth-top producing county in California. In 2019, Merced County generated $3.271 billion in total value of production. The top five commodities from 2019 in Merced are:

Crops	$ Amount (1,000)	Ranking in CA	% of State Total
Milk	905,116	2nd	15.5
Almonds	421,254	N/A	9.3
Cattle	297,451	4th	8.7
Chickens	294,633	2nd	8.1
Sweet Potatoes	234,964	1st	92.2

== Education ==
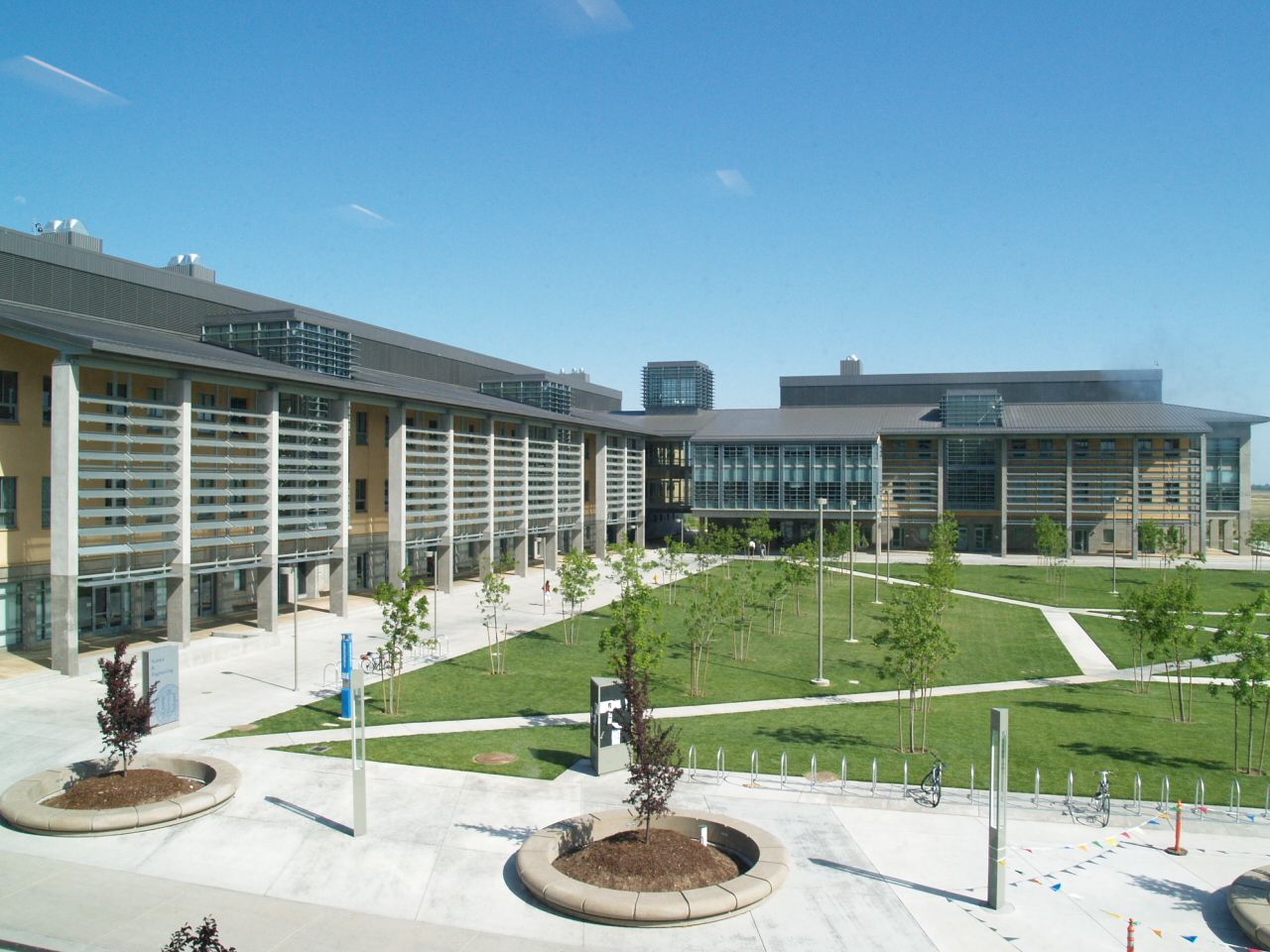
Science and Engineering 1 building at University of California, Merced

Merced is home to a community college, Merced College and the University of California Merced.

UC Merced now enrolls 8,321 undergraduate and 772 graduate students for a total of 9,093 students, as reported in the university's fall 2021 census. Of the 2021-2022 undergraduate degrees awarded, the top degrees were: 19% Biological Sciences, 16% Psychology, 11% Management, and 10% Computer Science Engineering. The University of California, Merced campus opened in late 2005 northeast of the city limits. UC Merced spans a campus area of 1,026 acres. UC Merced enrolled about 7,967 students during the 2017–2018 academic year.

Merced is served by the Merced City School District, which has four main middle schools, Cruickshank Middle School, Herbert Hoover Middle School, Rivera Middle School, and Tenaya Middle School. There are also 14 elementary schools in this district. It is also served by the Weaver School District, which has one middle school and two elementary campuses.

Merced Union High School District has three major public high school campuses in Merced, Merced High School, Golden Valley High School, and El Capitan High School as well as a few smaller campuses offering alternative education.

Merced's community college, Merced College, has an enrollment of 8,996 students as of January 2021. The main campus of Merced College covers an area of 267 acres.

== Health ==
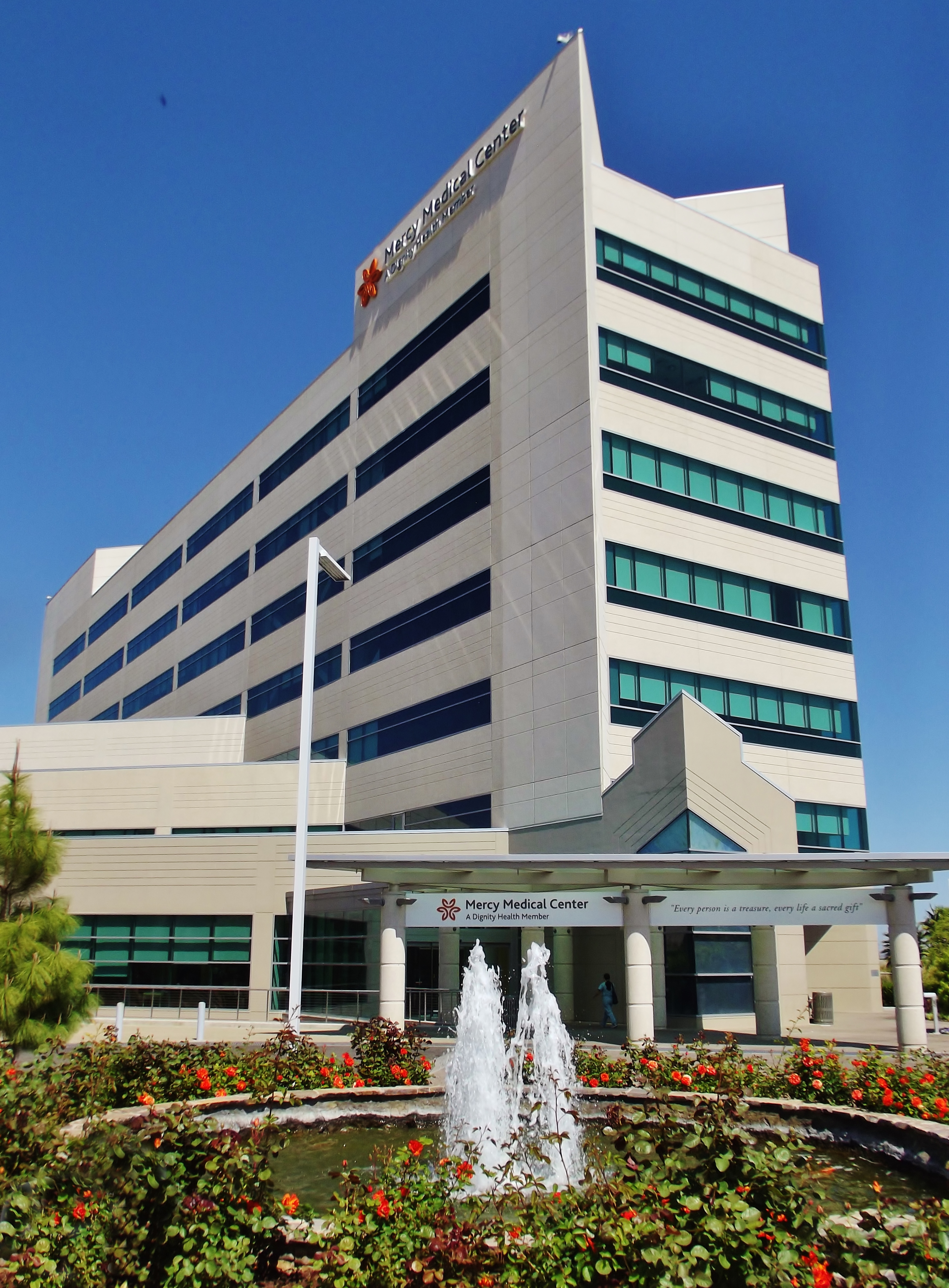
Mercy Medical Center, Merced California

Mercy Medical Center Merced. A 2016 Community Health Assessment prepared by the Merced County Department of Public Health (MCDPH), determined that top health topics that affect Merced and Merced county are heart disease and stroke; diabetes; access to health care; and drug and alcohol abuse. In 2017 the MCDPH published the Merced County Community Health Improvement Plan in an effort to "address health disparities and to promote health equity with the goal of health and wellness for all county residents."

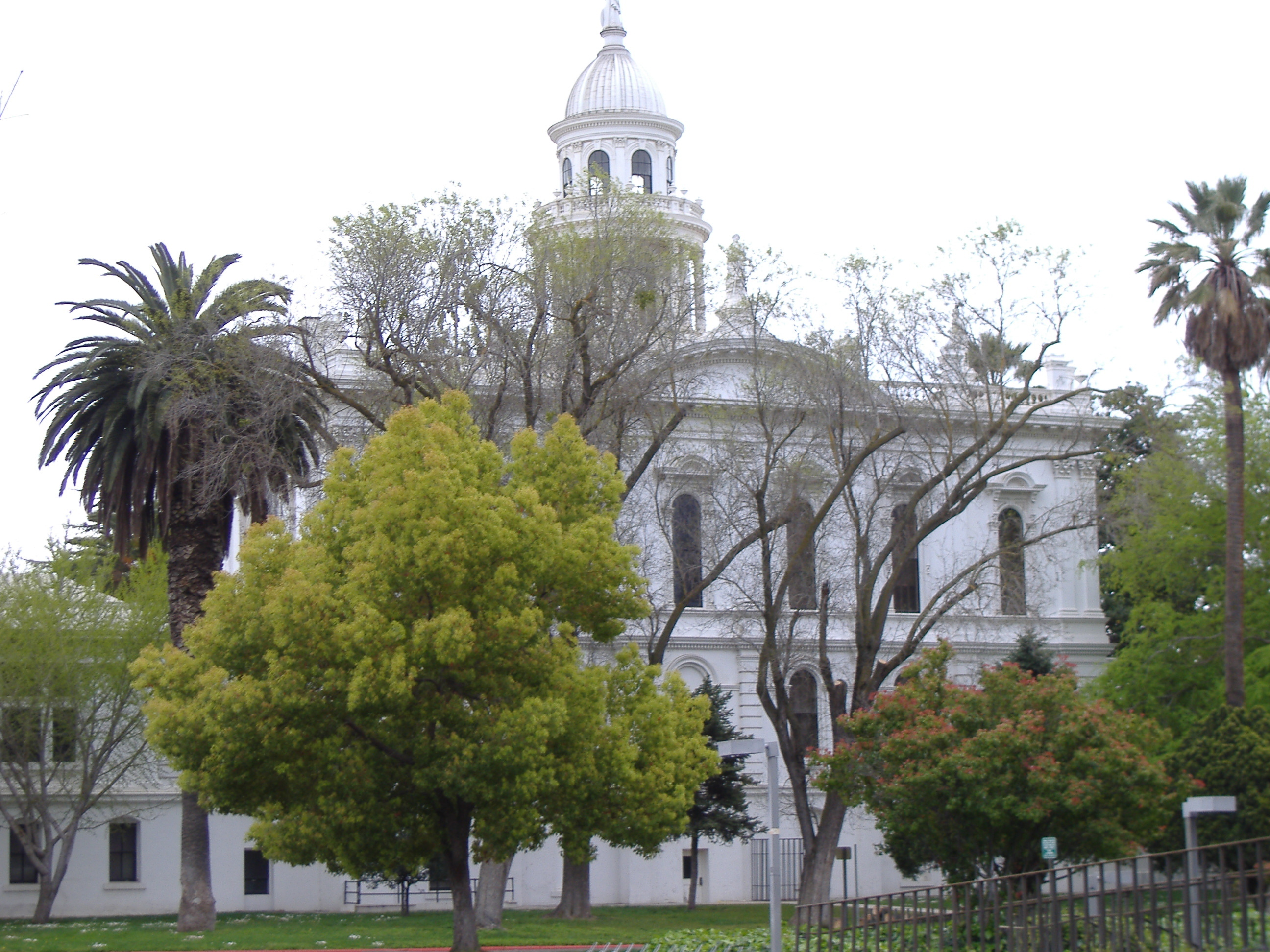
Historic County Courthouse, now serving as a museum

== Demographics ==
Historical population
Census	Pop.	Note	%±
1880	1,446		—
1890	2,009		38.9%
1900	1,969		−2.0%
1910	3,102		57.5%
1920	3,974		28.1%
1930	7,066		77.8%
1940	10,135		43.4%
1950	15,278		50.7%
1960	20,068		31.4%
1970	22,670		13.0%
1980	36,499		61.0%
1990	56,216		54.0%
2000	63,893		13.7%
2010	78,958		23.6%
2020	86,333		9.3%
U.S. Decennial Census

=== Racial and ethnic composition ===
Merced city, California – Racial and ethnic composition Note: the US Census treats Hispanic/Latino as an ethnic category. This table excludes Latinos from the racial categories and assigns them to a separate category. Hispanics/Latinos may be of any race.
Race / Ethnicity (NH = Non-Hispanic)	2020	2010	2000	1990	1980
White alone (NH)	23.6% (20,386)	30% (23,702)	37.8% (24,121)	48.9% (27,514)	62% (22,613)
Black alone (NH)	4.9% (4,191)	5.7% (4,483)	6.1% (3,864)	6.1% (3,406)	7.3% (2,647)
American Indian alone (NH)	0.5% (393)	0.5% (399)	0.6% (368)	0.7% (392)	0.9% (324)
Asian alone (NH)	10.7% (9,234)	11.6% (9,116)	11.2% (7,182)	14.2% (8,001)	1.6% (570)
Pacific Islander alone (NH)	0.2% (158)	0.2% (131)	0.1% (77)		
Other race alone (NH)	0.5% (444)	0.2% (129)	0.2% (124)	0.2% (117)	0.2% (56)
Multiracial (NH)	3.4% (2,910)	2.4% (1,858)	2.7% (1,732)	—	—
Hispanic/Latino (any race)	56.3% (48,617)	49.6% (39,140)	41.4% (26,425)	29.9% (16,786)	28.2% (10,289)

=== 2020 census ===
As of the 2020 census, Merced had a population of 86,333. The population density was 3,712.6 inhabitants per square mile (1,433.4/km^{2}), and the median age was 30.5 years.

The age distribution was 28.9% under the age of 18, 12.3% aged 18 to 24, 27.6% aged 25 to 44, 19.7% aged 45 to 64, and 11.6% who were 65 years of age or older. For every 100 females, there were 96.2 males, and for every 100 females age 18 and over there were 93.6 males.

The census reported that 98.9% of the population lived in households, 0.4% lived in non-institutionalized group quarters, and 0.6% were institutionalized. 99.6% of residents lived in urban areas, while 0.4% lived in rural areas.

There were 27,462 households, of which 42.1% included children under the age of 18. Of all households, 40.7% were married-couple households, 8.9% were cohabiting couple households, 31.0% had a female householder with no partner present, and 19.5% had a male householder with no partner present. 21.1% of households were one person, and 8.6% were one person aged 65 or older. The average household size was 3.11. There were 19,546 families (71.2% of all households).

There were 29,083 housing units at an average density of 1,250.7 units per square mile (482.9 units/km^{2}), of which 27,462 (94.4%) were occupied. Of occupied units, 43.3% were owner-occupied and 56.7% were renter-occupied. The homeowner vacancy rate was 1.5%, and the rental vacancy rate was 5.4%.

The most reported ancestries were:

- Mexican (50.9%)
- English (8%)
- German (6.5%)
- Irish (6.3%)
- Hmong (4.7%)
- African American (4.2%)
- Italian (2.7%)
- Filipino (2.3%)
- Portuguese (2.1%)
- Scottish (1.4%)

=== 2023 ACS 5-year estimate ===
In 2023, the US Census Bureau estimated that the median household income was $59,938, and the per capita income was $26,140. About 18.6% of families and 23.0% of the population were below the poverty line.

=== 2010 census ===
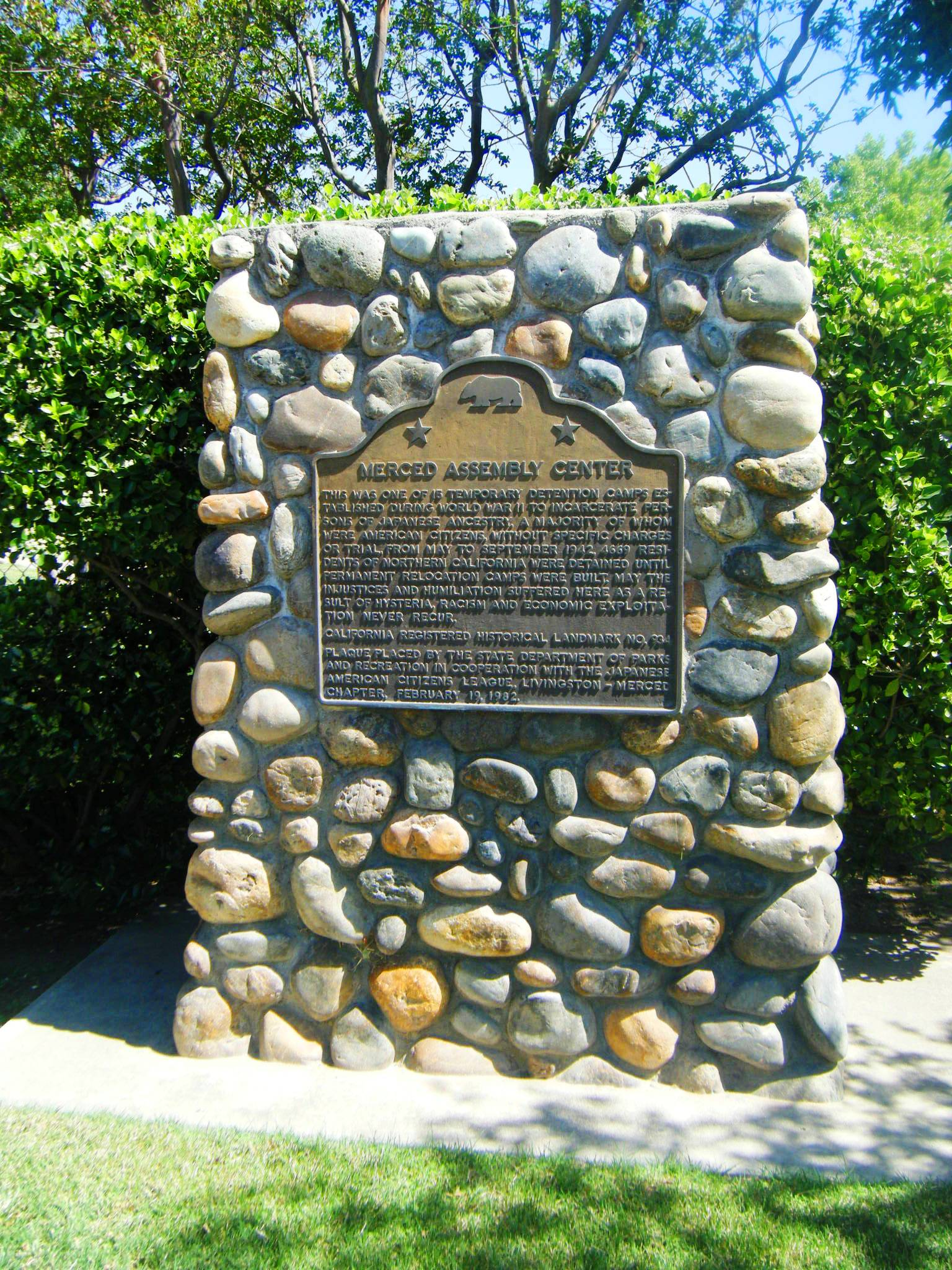
Monument commemorating the site of the Merced Assembly Center

The 2010 United States census reported that Merced had a population of 78,959. The population density was 3,386.4 people per square mile. (1,307.5/km^{2}). The racial makeup of Merced was 41,177 (52.2%) White, 4,958 (6.3%) African American, 1,153 (1.5%) Native American, 9,342 (11.8%) Asian, 174 (0.2%) Pacific Islander, 17,804 (22.5%) from other races, and 4,350 (5.5%) from two or more races. Hispanic or Latino of any race were 39,140 persons (49.6%).

The Census reported that 77,878 people (98.6% of the population) lived in households, 492 (0.6%) lived in non-institutionalized group quarters, and 588 (0.7%) were institutionalized.

There were 24,899 households, out of which 11,484 (46.1%) had children under the age of 18 living in them, 10,958 (44.0%) were opposite-sex married couples living together, 4,921 (19.8%) had a female householder with no husband present, 1,941 (7.8%) had a male householder with no wife present. There were 2,156 (8.7%) unmarried opposite-sex partnerships, and 167 (0.7%) same-sex married couples or partnerships. 5,356 households (21.5%) were made up of individuals, and 1,823 (7.3%) had someone living alone who was 65 years of age or older. The average household size was 3.13. There were 17,820 families (71.6% of all households); the average family size was 3.65.

The population was spread out, with 25,091 people (31.8%) under the age of 18, 10,475 people (13.3%) aged 18 to 24, 20,986 people (26.6%) aged 25 to 44, 15,484 people (19.6%) aged 45 to 64, and 6,922 people (8.8%) who were 65 years of age or older. The median age was 28.1 years. For every 100 females, there were 96.3 males. For every 100 females age 18 and over, there were 93.6 males.

There were 27,446 housing units at an average density of 1,177.1 per square mile (454.5/km^{2}), of which 10,637 (42.7%) were owner-occupied, and 14,262 (57.3%) were occupied by renters. The homeowner vacancy rate was 3.5%; the rental vacancy rate was 8.5%. 31,690 people (40.1% of the population) lived in owner-occupied housing units and 46,188 people (58.5%) lived in rental housing units.

=== Hmong community ===
Escaping persecution from Communist forces after the Laotian Civil War, Hmong refugees from Laos moved to the United States in the 1970s and '80s, first settling in Merced and other areas in the Central Valley of California. The Hmong could not initially take part in farming like they had expected, as the land was owned by other people. They could not get high end agricultural jobs because they did not speak sufficient English and Mexican migrants already held low end agricultural jobs. As such, a great many of Merced's Hmong collected social services and Hmong gangs arose, prompting other residents to perceive them as being the cause of economic troubles. As the Hmong settlement matured and the Hmong children gained English language skills, the town's overall attitude began to be more accepting of the Hmong community.

This acceptance is reflected in various services provided to the Hmong community. This includes the Merced Lao Family Community Inc., a nonprofit organization that provides social services to Hmong people, the Merced Department of Public Health's MATCH (Multidisciplinary Approach to Cross-Cultural Health) program, intending to draw Hmong patients into the health care system, a body of Hmong-speaking faculty and paraprofessionals (including college classes on Hmong culture and language), and media outlets for the Hmong community—cable television channel Channel 11 broadcasts programming to the Hmong community twice per week and radio station KBIF 900 AM airs programming oriented towards Hmong people.

While Merced has historically had a proportionally large portion of Hmong (in 1997, 12,000 of Merced's 61,000 residents were Hmong), demographic shifts have reduced this. The Personal Responsibility and Work Opportunity Act of 1996 prompted a move of some Hmong to Minnesota, North Carolina, and Wisconsin. More recently, many Hmong have gone to Alaska to work in crabbing and fishing industries that require little proficiency in English.

=== Black community ===
Through the years, Merced County has recognized many historic milestones. Some of those essential moments include the rise of Merced's first Black mayor, Sam Pipes in 1983 and the visit by first lady Michelle Obama to UC Merced for the university's 2009 commencement.

There's also the story of the late Charles Ogletree, a Merced native who rose from poverty to become a respected Harvard Law professor. Ogletree taught both Barack and Michelle Obama at Harvard; he remained close to Barack Obama throughout his apolitical career. Ogletree wrote opinion pieces on the state of race in the United States for major publications. Ogletree also served as the moderator for a panel discussion on civil rights in baseball on March 28, 2008, that accompanied the second annual Major League Baseball civil rights exhibition game the following day between the New York Mets and the Chicago White Sox.

=== Racial demographics ===
In 2010, Latinos became a majority population in Merced and Merced County as the agricultural industry brought in migrant farm laborers. The area's affordable housing prices attracted both Latino and Asian immigrants. Merced has large Asian-American (e.g. Hmong, followed by Chinese, Vietnamese, Laotian, Cambodian, Filipino, Thai, Korean and Asian Indian) populations relative to the city and county's population size.

In Merced County, Black history goes back to before the Civil War. According to historian Sarah Lim, during the mid-1800s Blacks came to this region and California as enslaved persons, while others arrived as free settlers. The 2011 census reported that 9,837 Black or African Americans lived in Merced County

=== Crime ===
In 2021, Merced had approximately 4,000 violent crimes occur within the city. This means that with a population of just 89,303 people, in 2021, individuals had approximately a 4.5% chance of falling victim to a crime while living-in or visiting Merced. Of the crimes that occurred, roughly 1,200 were physical (such as assault, rape or homicide) and 2,500 were property-related (e.g. burglary and theft). However, these crimes occurring in 2021 resulted in 13 fatalities. With its high crime rate, Merced is considered one of the "50 most dangerous" Californian cities to live in.

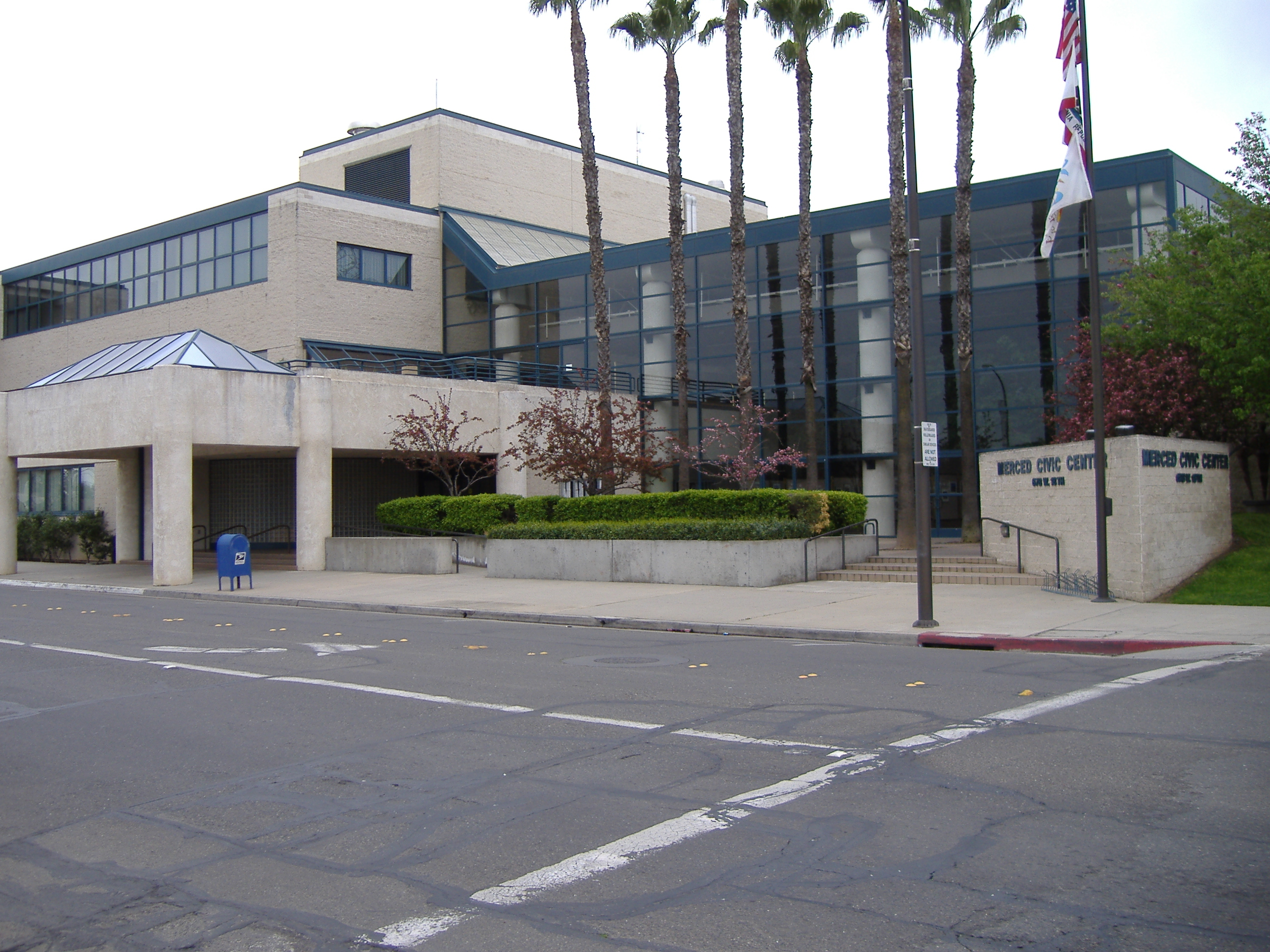
Civic Center in Merced

== Government ==
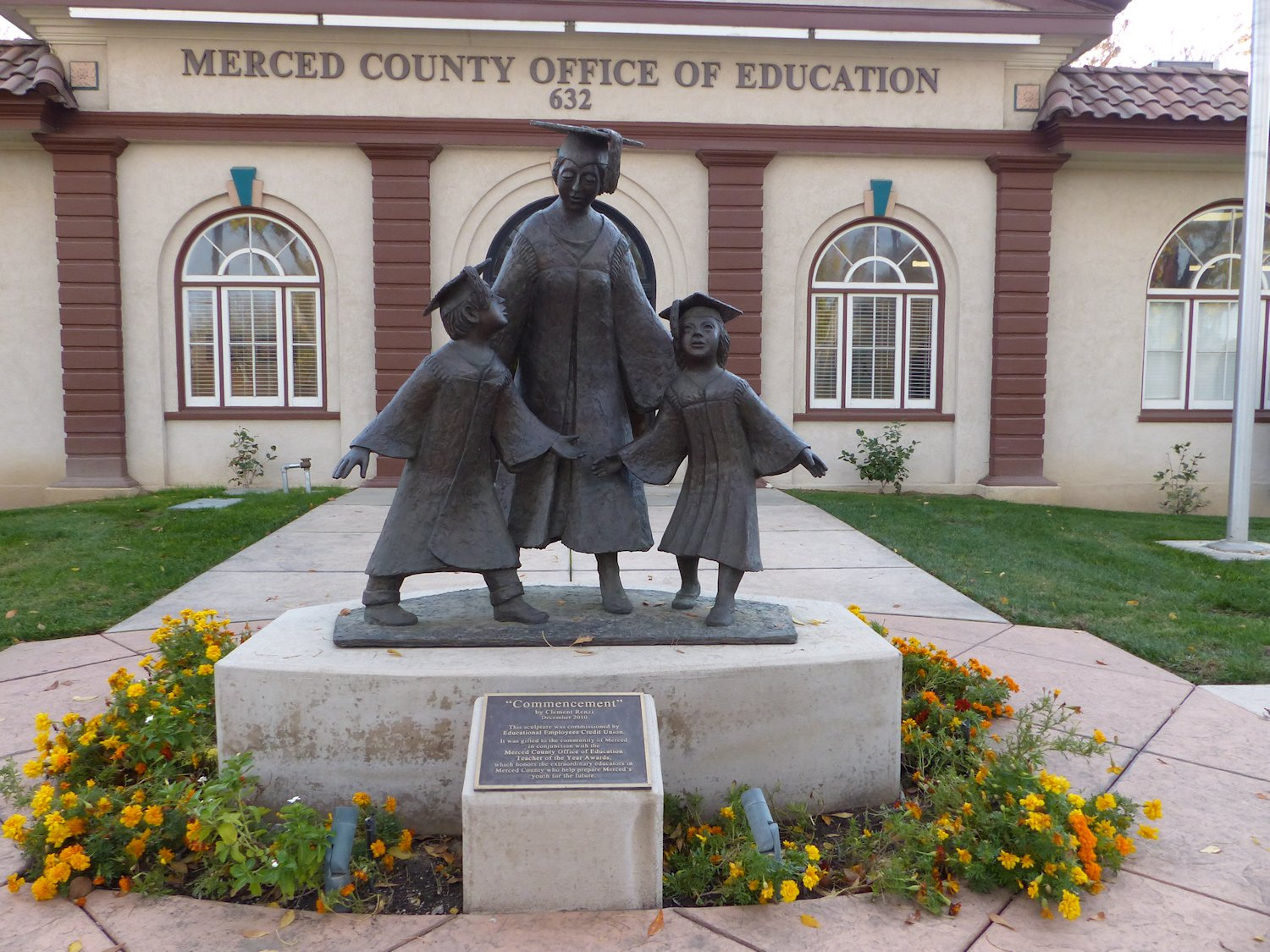
Merced County Office of Education

In the California State Legislature, Merced is in the 14th senatorial district, represented by Democrat Anna Caballero, and in the 27th Assembly district, represented by Democrat Esmeralda Soria.

In the United States House of Representatives, Merced is in California's 13th congressional district, represented by Democrat Adam Gray.

Merced is a charter city that operates under a council–manager government.

== Sports ==
UC Merced is a member of the National Association of Intercollegiate Athletics (NAIA) and competes in the California Pacific (Cal Pac) Conference. It offers men's and women's basketball, volleyball, soccer, water polo, cross country and track. In July 2024, it was announced that in 2026-2027, UC Merced will begin NCAA Division II competition in the 2025-26 academic year and will be fully eligible for postseason in 2026-27.

Merced High School and Golden Valley High School sponsor athletics as well.

Merced has a history of minor league baseball including the California League Merced Bears (1940s) and Atwater Angels (1970s) in nearby Atwater, California. There were the defunct Merced Black Bears of the Horizon Air Summer Series and the current Atwater Aviators of the Golden State Collegiate Baseball League.

Merced Golf & Country Club is a private, member owned golf club established in 1926, featuring an 18 hole, par-72 course that was designed by Bob Baldock. The club hosted the inaugural Northern California Golf Association Super Senior Championship in 2010, a tournament made for golfers aged 65 and older.

== Transportation ==
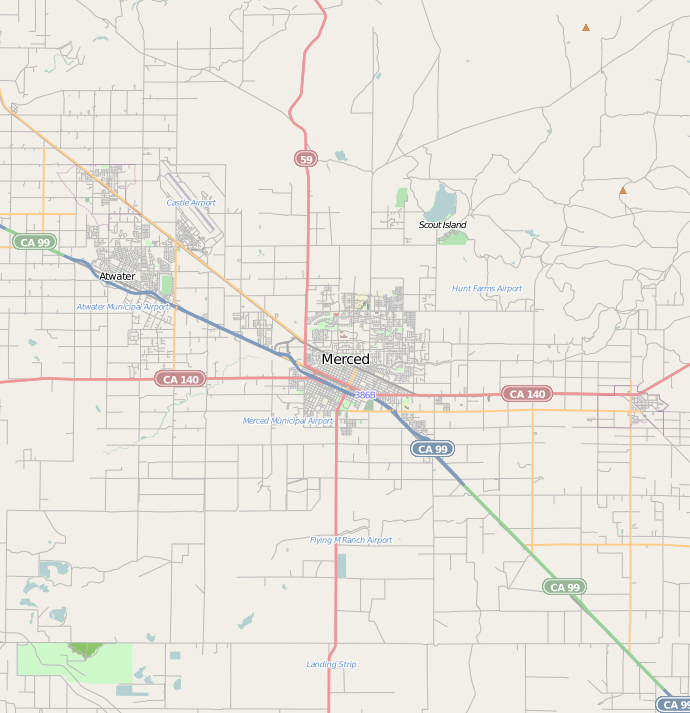
Major highways near Merced

=== Major highways ===
- State Route 59
- State Route 99
- State Route 140

=== Air ===
- Merced Regional Airport offers passenger service provided by Advanced Air, offering daily flights to Las Vegas International Airport (LAS) and Hawthorne Municipal Airport.
- Castle Airport in nearby Atwater, California.

=== Bus ===
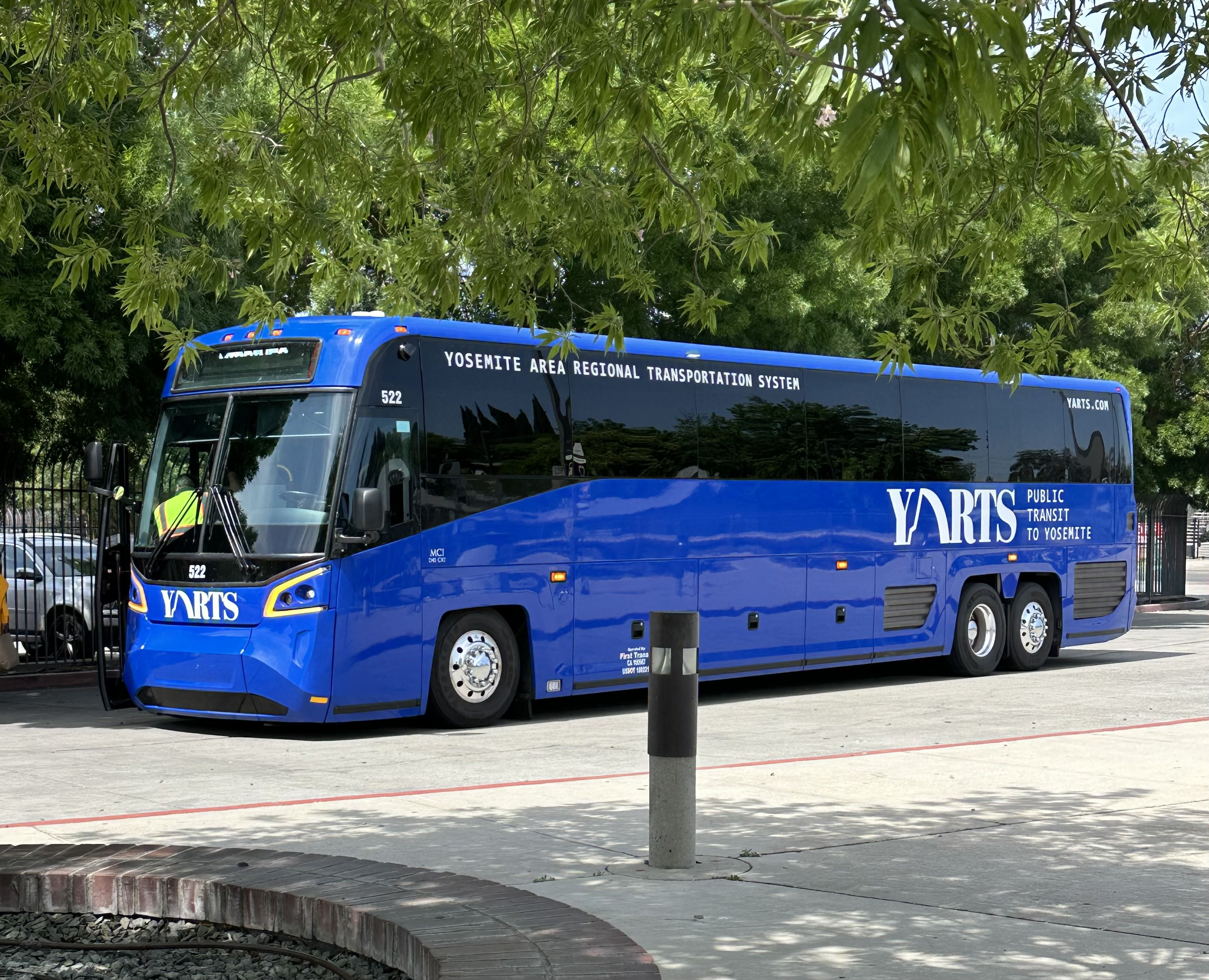
YARTS Bus at Merced Amtrak Station

- Greyhound, Intercalifornias, TUFESA and Fronteras del Norte serve Merced.
- YARTS provides scheduled service into Yosemite National Park.
- Merced County Transit, "The Bus", operates both regularly scheduled fixed route bus service and Dial-A-Ride (demand response) transportation services throughout Merced County.
- CatTracks is UC Merced's bus service, which connects students, staff and faculty at the university to off-campus apartments, the off-campus Castle facilities, local amenities, the Amtrak station, and the downtown area. CatTracks also has a live map.

=== Rail ===
Gold Runner provides passenger service.

Map of proposed route, also including the proposed Brightline West to Las Vegas

The Yosemite Valley Railroad ran from Merced between 1907 and 1945.

==== High-speed rail ====
The California High-Speed Rail Authority February 2016 draft business plan, outlined the Merced station as not beginning service at the same time as the initial San Jose to Bakersfield route in 2025, but would likely open in 2029 instead. This would make the leg between the Central Valley and Pacheco Pass the first to be constructed. The Merced City Council vigorously opposed the delay in their city's station opening, noting Merced's volume of commuters seeking high-speed rail to access jobs in Silicon Valley. In response, the April 2016 revisions to the business plan indeed included Merced in the initial construction segment, initially as a single-track spur connecting only to the westbound track to the Bay Area, with build out of the full Wye happening later. The system will run from San Francisco to the Los Angeles basin in under three hours at speeds capable of over 200 miles per hour. In August 2022, the CAHSRA announced that it had received a $25,000,000 RAISE Grant to advance design work from Madera to Merced.

Sample trips in the California High Speed rail would include:

- Merced to Fresno - 30 minutes
- Merced to Sacramento – 43 minutes
- Merced to San Jose – 45 minutes
- Merced to San Francisco – 1 hour and 15 minutes
- Merced to Los Angeles – 1 hour and 40 minutes

Altamont Corridor Express Extension

The ACE regional rail system is pursuing an extension to Merced as a part of its broader Altamont Corridor Vision plan. The Final Environmental Impact Report for the Ceres-Merced extension was approved on December 3, 2021.

== Notable people ==
- Lloyd Allen, MLB pitcher
- Ray Allen, NBA player
- Jeff Ball, MLB player
- Summer Bartholomew, Miss California USA 1975, Miss USA 1975
- Michael Basinger, NFL player for the Green Bay Packers
- Bruce Bowen, NBA player for the San Antonio Spurs
- Jim Brewer, MLB pitcher
- Tom Cable, NFL player and coach, former head coach of Oakland Raiders
- Diana Serra Cary, child actress known as "Baby Peggy", writer, silent film historian and advocate for child actors
- Alfonso Ocampo Chavez, MLS player for Seattle Sounders FC
- Margaret Dingeldein, member of women's US Olympic water polo team at 2004 Athens Olympics
- Tommy Duncan, singer with Bob Wills and Texas Playboys, buried in Merced
- Marvin Eastman, mixed martial arts fighter
- Doug Fister, MLB player for the Washington Nationals
- John Flinn, MLB player for the Baltimore Orioles and Milwaukee Brewers
- Dylan Floro, MLB player for the Washington Nationals
- Brian Fuentes, MLB player for six teams
- Katie Gallagher, finalist on reality television show Survivor: Palau
- Jerry Garvin, MLB pitcher for the Toronto Blue Jays
- Adam Gray, U.S. representative, former California state assemblyman
- Jalen Green, NBA player for the Houston Rockets, selected 2nd overall in the 2021 Draft
- Dave Henderson, MLB player for five teams
- Salar Kamangar, Former CEO of YouTube, founding member of Google's product team
- Philip H. Lathrop, Emmy-winning, Oscar-nominated cinematographer
- Janet Leigh, actress, star of Psycho (1960) by Alfred Hitchcock
- Gerald Madkins, NBA player and executive
- Don Manoukian, was an American football guard and professional wrestler of Armenian descent from Reno, Nevada.
- Blas Minor, MLB pitcher
- Bill Mooneyham, MLB player for the Oakland Athletics
- Demi Moore, actress, lived briefly in Merced
- Dwayne Murphy, MLB player for the Oakland Athletics
- Charles Ogletree, Harvard Law School professor, and public intellectual
- Curtis Partch, MLB player for the Cincinnati Reds
- Mari-Lynn Poskin, member of the Kansas House of Representatives
- Chris Pritchett, MLB player
- Peter Rojas, Founder of Engadget
- Dusty Ryan, MLB player for the New York Mets
- Daniel Silva, best-selling novelist
- Tony Slaton, NFL player for the Los Angeles Rams and Dallas Cowboys
- Cary Stayner, serial killer
- Steven Stayner, kidnap victim
- Rowena Granice Steele (1824–1901), American performer, editor, publisher
- Joyce Sumbi (1935-2010), African-American librarian
- Thad Tillotson, MLB player for the New York Yankees
- Rick Williams, MLB pitcher for the Houston Astros

== See also ==
- Merced County, California
- California Historical Landmarks in Merced County
