= Merced County High School =

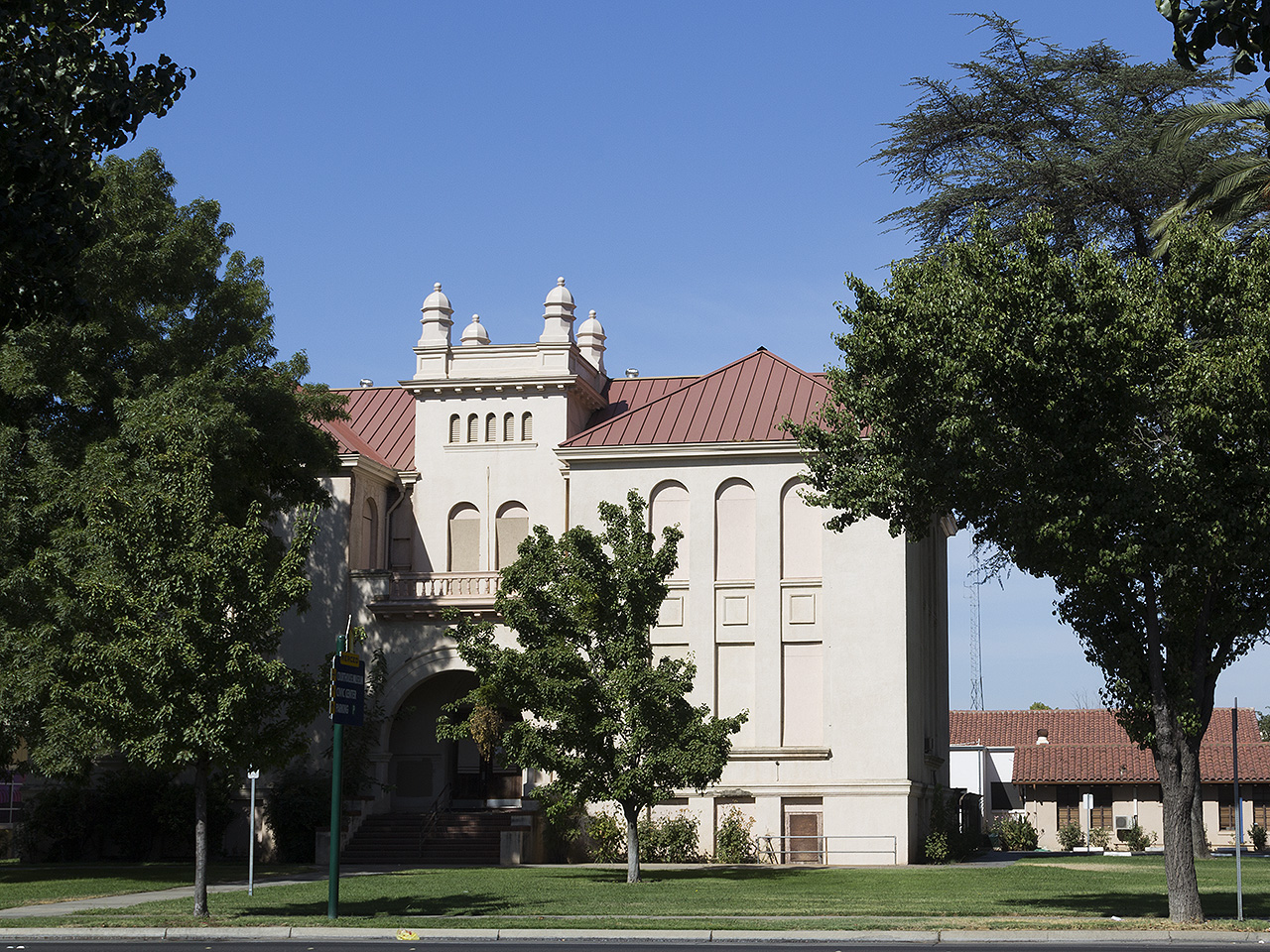

Location
- 2125 M Street; Merced, California; United States; 37°18′24″N 120°28′58″W

Information
- Type: Public high school
- Closed: 1920
- Campus size: 0.3 acres (0.12 ha)
- Merced County High School
- U.S. National Register of Historic Places
- Built: 1897
- Architect: Louis S. Stone
- Architectural style: Romanesque, Richardsonian Romanesque
- NRHP reference No.: 84000909
- Added to NRHP: May 31, 1984

Merced County High School, also known as the County Library Building, was a historic building located at 2125 M St. in Merced, California, United States. Built in 1897, the school was the first public high school in Merced County. The brick and wood building was designed in the Richardsonian Romanesque style and featured a hip roof with cross gables, a rounded entry, windows arranged in a ribbon patter, and a since-removed wooden tower. The school's brick exterior was later plastered over and its roof painted red, giving the building a Mission Revival appearance. The building served as a high school until 1920; in the following year, the county library moved into the building, where it remained until 1976.

Merced County High School was added to the National Register of Historic Places on May 31, 1984.

On December 2, 2024, the high school building caught fire and was completely destroyed. The remaining rubble was demolished that same day.
