= Merced County Courthouse =

- U.S. National Register of Historic Places
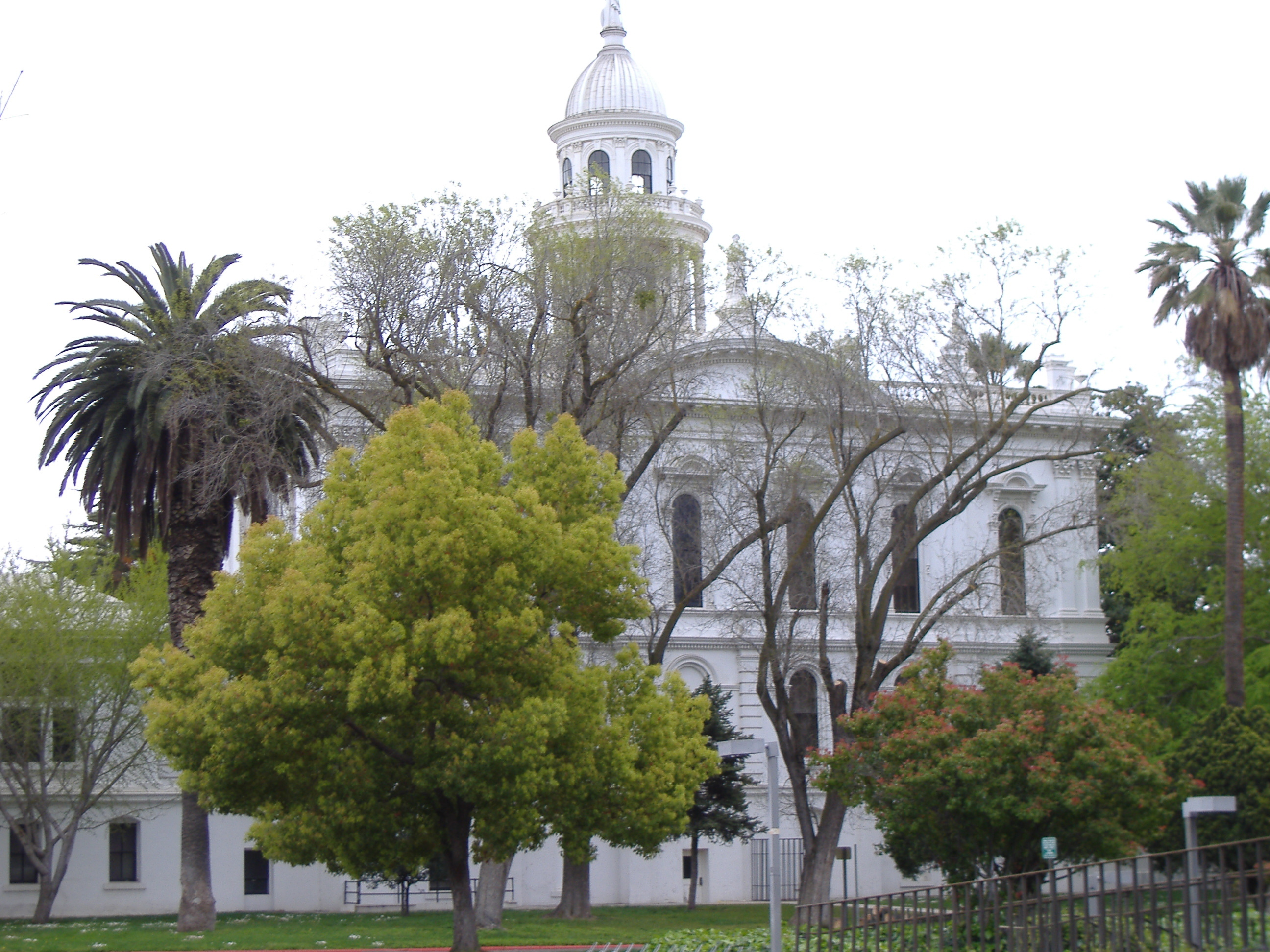

- Location within California Location within the United States
- Interactive map showing the location of Merced County Courthouse
- Location: W. 21st and N Sts., Merced, California
- Coordinates: 37°18′22″N 120°29′00″W
- Area: 11 acres (4.5 ha)
- Built: 1875
- Built by: Burrell, A.W.,& Co.
- Architect: Bennett, A. A.
- Architectural style: Renaissance, Italian Renaissance Revival
- NRHP reference No.: 75000441
- Added to NRHP: October 29, 1975

The Merced County Courthouse is the historic county courthouse in Merced County, California. Located at the intersection of W. 21st and N Streets in Merced, the building served as Merced County's courthouse from 1875 until 1975. A. A. Bennett, an architect who also worked on the California State Capitol, designed the building. The building's Italian Renaissance design was styled to resemble a palazzo; it features a white plaster exterior, a portico with a balcony on the south side, and a cupola atop the roof. A nearly identical courthouse was built in Fresno County at the same time; this building was modified extensively and later demolished, leaving the Merced County Courthouse as the only remaining example of its design. The building's architecture is unique within the southern Central Valley; in its National Register nomination, the courthouse was called "the best example of the Italian Renaissance revival remaining between Sacramento and Los Angeles".

The building is now a museum of local history known as the Merced County Courthouse Museum that is operated by the Merced County Historical Society. Exhibits include the Superior Courtroom, a historic schoolroom and blacksmith shop.

The Merced County Courthouse was added to the National Register of Historic Places on October 29, 1975.
