= Hiếu Liêm =

Hiếu Liêm may refer to several places in Vietnam, including:

- Hiếu Liêm, Bình Dương, a commune of Bắc Tân Uyên District
- Hiếu Liêm, Đồng Nai, a commune of Vĩnh Cửu District
