= Phước Thành =

Phước Thành may refer to several places in Vietnam:

- Phước Thành, Ho Chi Minh City, a commune in the former Phú Giáo district
- Phước Thành, Đà Nẵng, a commune in the former Phước Sơn district
- Phước Thành province (1959–1965), a former province of South Vietnam
