= Phú Giáo =

Commune in Ho Chi Minh City, Vietnam

Phú Giáo Xã Phú Giáo Phước Vĩnh
- Commune
- Interactive map of Phú Giáo
- Coordinates: 11°17′52″N 106°48′14″E
- Country: Vietnam
- City: Ho Chi Minh City
- Established: June 16, 2025

Area
  - Total: 74.45 sq mi (192.83 km^{2})

Population (2024)
  - Total: 42,739
  - Density: 574.05/sq mi (221.64/km^{2})
- Time zone: UTC+07:00 (Indochina Time)
- Administrative code: 25858

Phú Giáo (Vietnamese: Xã Phú Giáo) is a commune of Ho Chi Minh City, Vietnam. It is one of the 168 new wards, communes and special zones of the city following the reorganization in 2025.

== Geography ==
Phú Giáo is located in the north of Ho Chi Minh City, it is roughly about 65 kilometers north of Saigon ward. It borders the following communes:

- To the north, it borders the communes of Đồng Phú and Tân Lợi of Đồng Nai.
- To the east, it borders Trị An in Đồng Nai.
- To the south, it borders Bắc Tân Uyên, with the Bé River forming the boundary.
- To the southwest, it borders Phước Hòa.
- To the west, it borders Phước Thành.

According to Official Dispatch No. 2896/BNV-CQĐP dated May 27, 2025 of the Ministry of Home Affairs, following the merger, Phú Giáo has a land area of 192.83 km², the population as of December 31, 2024 is 42,739 people, the population density is 221 people/km².

== History ==
On June 16, 2025, the National Assembly Standing Committee issued Resolution No. 1685/NQ-UBTVQH15 on the arrangement of commune-level administrative units of Ho Chi Minh City in 2025 (effective from June 16, 2025). Accordingly, the entire land area and population of Phước Vĩnh township, An Bình commune and part of Tam Lập commune of the former Phú Giáo district will be integrated into a new commune named Phú Giáo (Clause 138, Article 1).
