= Royal Lao Navy =

Naval component of the Royal Lao Armed Forces

- Marine Royale Laotiènne ກອງທັບເຣືອພຣະຣາຊອານາຈັກລາວ
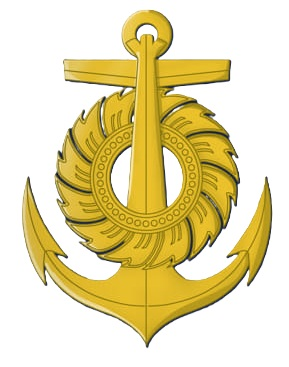
- Royal Lao Navy emblem (1961–1975)
- Active: 1 August 1952 – 2 November 1975
- Country: Kingdom of Laos
- Allegiance: Royal Lao Government; HM The King of Laos
- Branch: Naval Force
- Type: Navy
- Role: Naval warfare Brown-water navy
- Size: 500 men, 42 boats and other vessels (at height in 1974)
- Part of: Royal Lao Armed Forces
- Garrison/HQ: Wattay Airbase, near Vientiane; Chinaimo, near Vientiane
- Nicknames: Lao River Squadron (EFL in French), Lao River Speedboat Squadron (EVFL in French), RLN (MRL in French)
- Mottos: ປົກປ້ອງແຫຼ່ງນ້ຳຂອງປະເທດລາວ "Protection des eaux du Laos" "Safeguarding the Waters of Laos"
- Colours: Navy blue, red
- Anniversaries: 1 August – MRL Day
- Engagements: First Indochina War; Laotian Civil War; Vietnam War

Commanders
- Notable commanders: Soulignet Chounramany; Mok Kouvongsavanh; Sinthanavong Kindavong

Insignia
- MRL Naval ensign (1952–1975)

The Royal Lao Navy (Lao: ກອງທັບເຣືອພຣະຣາຊອານາຈັກລາວ; French: Marine Royale Laotiènne – MRL) was the naval component of the Royal Lao Armed Forces (FAR), the official military of the Royal Lao Government and the Kingdom of Laos during the Laotian Civil War between 1960 and 1975.

== History ==
The Laotian Navy (Marine Laotiènne) was first formed on August 1, 1952, as the "naval" wing of the Laotian National Army (ANL) and designated the Lao River Squadron (Escadrille Fluviale Lao – EFL) or River Squadron (Escadrille Fluviale) for short. An exclusively brown-water force since Laos is a landlocked country, the new ANL River Squadron was provided at the time with eleven ex-French Navy FOM escort crafts, which had seen service during the First Indochina War, ten Mytho-class flat-bottomed wooden boats and six outboard canoes for light transportation duties. Initially headquartered at the French Air Force's Wattay Airbase near Vientiane, with small elements stationed in Savannakhet and Pakse, EFL strength in 1952 stood at just 80 all-ranks, including three French naval officers, three ANL officers, five French senior Petty Officers and 18 ANL Non-commissioned officers (NCOs). Most of the Laotian EFL junior ranks were immediately sent for four months of riverine training in Saigon, South Vietnam, manned by French Officers and senior Petty Officers seconded from the naval forces component of the French Far East Expeditionary Corps (CEFEO).

Beginning that same year, a number of Laotian naval officer candidate students (Eléves Officiers de Marine – EOMs) were sent to France, in order to attend advanced Officer and Petty Officer courses at the French Naval Academy in Brest; every year, two or three Officers and three Petty Officers went to France for specialist courses, and also received on-the-job training with the Rhine Flotilla (Flotilla du Rhin). Other Laotian naval personnel went to South Vietnam, where they attended training courses offered by the Republic of Vietnam Navy at their Training Centers located in Saigon, Nha Trang, and Cam Ranh Bay; further on-the-job training was provided to Laotian recruits by the Royal Thai Navy in Thailand. Additional technical assistance was provided by the Americans through the Programs Evaluation Office (PEO) since 1959, in the form of marine mechanics courses conducted by a PEO instructor team led by a U.S. Navy Reserve Officer at the flotilla's repair shop in Chinaimo Naval Base, whilst two contracted Filipino technicians from the Eastern Construction Company (abbreviated as ECCOIL) were assigned to the ANL River Flotilla headquarters to train Laotian sailors.

In July 1959, the ANL River Flotilla, whose strength peaked at 200 sailors and ratings operating a surface fleet of 32 small patrol boats and landing crafts, was re-designated Laotian Navy and became an independent branch, now part of the newly created Laotian Armed Forces (Forces Armées Laotiennes – FAL), renamed Royal Lao Armed Forces (Forces Armées du Royaume – FAR) in September 1961.

== The MRL in the Laotian civil war ==
=== Early operations 1960–1970 ===
Like the ANL, the fledgling Laotian Navy soon found itself involved in the political turmoil that engulfed the Kingdom of Laos in the early 1960s. During Major general Phoumi Nosavan November 1960 counter-coup against Captain Kong Le's rebel Neutralist airborne units, four pro-Neutralist Laotian Navy river gunboats blocked the Mekong river at Ban Sot in an effort to halt the advance northwards from Savannakhet of Maj. Gen. Nosavan's counter-coup troops towards Vientiane. Other Laotian Naval units however, supported the coup by transporting up the Mekong in landing crafts from Savannakhet Lieutenant colonel Siho Lamphouthacoul and his Directorate of National Coordination (DNC) elite para-commando regiment, the 1st Special Mobile Group (Groupement Mobile Speciale 1 – GMS 1), on 21 November to join the Battle of Vientiane.

In 1970, a US-funded Royal Lao Navy Jungle School (MRL École de la Jungle) was established at Thakhek in Khammouane Province, which offered courses for MRL students in basic infantry amphibious tactics and river patrolling techniques. Graduation exercises had the Laotian naval cadets assault beaches from landing craft, though these tactics were never used in actual operations.

=== Final operations 1971–1975 ===
Besides training programs and technical assistance, what no country agreed to provide was new hardware. A 1971 US Navy assessment of the MRL flotilla included a recommendation that four PBR Mk 1/2 "Bibber" river patrol boats be handed over, but these were never forthcoming. Meantime, attrition was taking a heavy toll. By 1970, all the Privat gunboats had been effectively decommissioned and most of the landing crafts were down for repairs.

Rather than combat operations, the MRL more often found itself saddled with ceremonial duties and VIP protection. Taking a page from the Royal Thai Navy, the MRL was tasked with augmenting the Laotian Royal Guard; when the Laotian King Savang Vatthana was in residence at his Palace in Luang Prabang, eight MRL sailors on guard duty were split among the Palace's four entrances. During the King's official trips around the country, 31 guards from the MRL were among his bodyguard detail.

In November 1972, the MRL carried out its third and final combat operation, when it was called to participate in the defence of the river town of Thakhek, the capital of Khammouane province in the Military Region 3 (MR 3), threatened by a North Vietnamese Army (NVA) ground offensive. Several FOM 11 gunboats were dispatched up the Mekong from Savannakhet and promptly arrived near Thakhek, providing heavy-weapons fire in support of a combined RLA counter-offensive that successfully repulsed the North Vietnamese assaults.

There were no further combat assignments, and for the remaining three years of the War, the MRL's flotilla was largely inactive apart from occasionally escorting supply convoys. This situation lasted until August 23, 1975, when the Pathet Lao entered Vientiane and dissolved the FAR. On 2 November that year the MRL was disbanded, with Captain Sinthanavong Kindavong being forced to resign and sent to a re-education camp in Sam Neua. All former MRL assets – 36 boats in total, including the handful of vessels that were still operable – were seized by the Pathet Lao government and repurposed to equip the new Lao People's Navy (LPN).

== Structure ==
The MRL, along with the Royal Lao Air Force (RLAF) and the Royal Lao Army (RLA), was subordinated to the Ministry of Defence in Vientiane; its administrative headquarters was allocated at Camp Chinaimo, a major FAR military base in the southern outskirts of the Laotian capital, whose facilities also housed the main repair yard, the Fleet Command and the Independent Directorate of Laotian River Transports (Régie Autonome des Transports Fluviaux du Laos – RATFL), which handled military logistics and monotorized commercial shipping along the Mekong river.

=== Fleet organization ===
By April 1975, Royal Lao Navy strength peaked at 500 Ratings and enlisted men led by Captain Sinthanavong Kindavong, who manned a single river flotilla totalling 42 light vessels, divided since the mid-1950s into a patrol squadron (Escadrille Fluviale du Haut Mekong – EFHM) and a squadron-sized transport section (Séction de Transports Fluviaux du Laos – STFL). Throughout its existence, the MRL received technical and training assistance mainly from France and the United States, who also provided river patrol boats and transportation craft to equip their patrol and transport squadrons respectively. Most of the Laotian Navy river assets were stationed permanently at Chinaimo Naval Base, with secondary riverine stations set along the Mekong at Luang Prabang, Pak Lay, Thakhek, Savannakhet, Paksé and Khong Island. Besides its tiny surface fleet, the MRL was also unique in its genre for not maintaining a permanent Naval Infantry branch or even specialist combat diver/Marine Commando units.

== List of Laotian Navy commanders ==
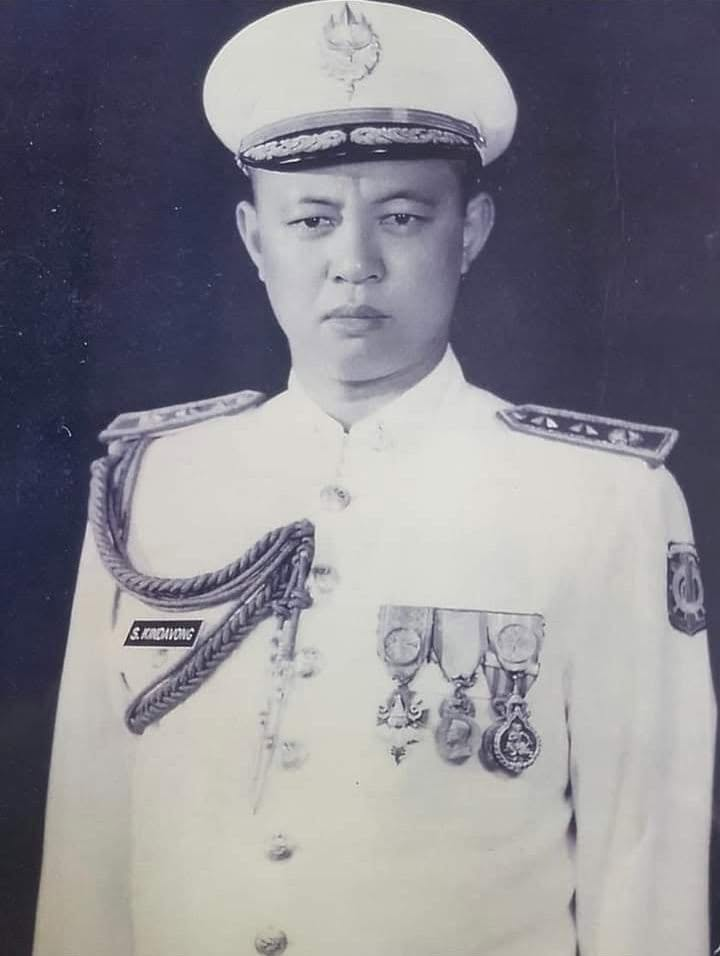
Captain Sinthanavong Kindavong, commander of the Royal Lao Navy in "dress whites", Vientiane, Laos, 1970–74.

- Commander Soulignet Chounramany (1954–1957)
- Commander Mok Kouvongsavanh (1960–1964)
- Captain Sinthanavong Kindavong (1957–1960; 1964–1975)

=== Deputy Laotian Navy commanders ===
- Lieutenant Commander Souk Dary

=== Junior Laotian Navy commanders ===
- Lieutenant Sorasak Chounramany – head of the MRL Jungle School.

== Equipment ==
=== Escort and combat patrol craft ===
- Nine Wizard-class river gunboats (a.k.a. Privats)
- Eight FOM 11 patrol and escort boats
- Three FOM 8 patrol and escort boats

=== Troop transport, amphibious assault, and logistical operations craft ===
- Five Landing Craft Vehicle Personnel (LCVP)
- Seven Landing Craft Mechanized Mk 6 Mod 1-LCM (6) Landing Craft Utility (LCU)

== MRL uniforms and insignia ==
The Laotian Navy owed its origin and traditions to the French Far East Naval Forces (Forces Maritimes en Extrême-Orient – FMEO) of the First Indochina War, and even after the United States took the role as the main foreign sponsor for the Royal Laotian Armed Forces at the beginning of the 1960s, French military influence was still perceptible in their uniforms and insignia.

=== Service dress and field uniforms ===
Upon the formation of the MRL at the early 1950s, Laotian naval senior officers and petty officers adopted a unique Beige-Khaki service uniform of French pattern, which consisted of a double-breasted reefer jacket (Vareuse) with open collar and lapels, and featuring two internal skirt pockets with external flaps. The jacket had a double row of six gilt metal anchor motif buttons, and was worn with a white shirt and black tie, completed with matching Beige-Khaki trousers. Enlisted personnel also received a French-style Beige-Khaki service uniform or Sailor suit, consisting of a Navy jumper (or pullover shirt) and trousers flared as "bell bottoms". A French-style Navy blue striped long sleeve T-shirt was worn under the jumper. For formal occasions, Laotian Navy officers received the earlier ANL white summer cotton full dress, which consisted of a French-style eight-buttoned tunic with a standing collar and two built-in side pockets closed by straight flaps, worn with matching white slacks. The tunic's front fly was secured by gilt metal buttons bearing the ANL Airavata crest (Erawan). After 1959–60, this uniform was replaced by the standard Royal Lao Armed Forces (FAR) "dress whites", comprising an eight-buttoned tunic with a standing collar, provided with two breast pockets and two side pockets, all unpleated and closed by clip-cornered straight flaps, also worn with matching white slacks. The tunic's front fly was secured by gilt metal buttons now bearing the FAR wreathed "Shiva" trident motif.

Most Laotian Navy personnel received the standard French Navy's tropical working and service dress, consisting of a light khaki cotton shirt and pants. The French Navy's M1948 shirt (Chemise kaki clair Mle 1948) featured a six-buttoned front and two pleated breast pockets closed by pointed flaps, was provided with shoulder straps (Epaulettes) and had long sleeves with buttoned cuffs. It was worn with matching khaki M1945/52 slacks (Pantalon kaki clair Mle 1945/52), which featured two pleats at the front hips, side slashed pockets and an internal pocket at the back, on the right side. The French Army's tropical light khaki cotton shirt and pants (Tenue de toile kaki clair Mle 1945), modelled after the World War II U.S. Army tropical "Chino" working dress was also issued. While the cut of the matching khaki trousers was virtually identical to the Navy pattern, the shirt had two patch breast pockets closed by clip-cornered straight flaps and shoulder straps. In alternative, the short-sleeved M1946 (Chemisette kaki clair Mle 1946) – whose cut was almost identical to the M1948 variant – and the "Chino"-style M1949 (Chemisette kaki clair Mle 1949) khaki shirts could be worn with the matching M1946 khaki shorts (Culotte courte kaki clair Mle 1946) in hot weather. On active service, Laotian Navy boat crewmen wore French all-arms M1947 drab green fatigues (Treillis de combat Mle 1947), standard issue in the FAL in the 1950s.

Reflecting the increasing American influence, a new set of distinctive uniforms was introduced for the MRL in the early 1960s. Senior officers and petty officers were given a Navy blue overseas service uniform, which consisted of a double-breasted reefer jacket with a double row of six gilt metal buttons bearing the FAR wreathed "Shiva" trident, and was worn with a white shirt and Navy blue tie, completed with matching Navy blue trousers. Enlisted ranks received a Navy blue Sailor suit as their overseas service uniform. MRL personnel also began to wear U.S.-supplied OG 107 jungle fatigues, standard issue in the FAR; Thai and South Vietnamese versions, as well as Laotian-made copies were also worn. All these variants of the OG-107 fatigues often featured modifications to the original design such as shirts with shoulder straps and pockets closed by dual-buttoned straight flaps or pen pockets added on the left sleeve above the elbow, an affection common to all Laotian, South Vietnamese and Cambodian military officers, and additional side "cargo" pockets on the trousers. Olive Green M1967 Jungle Utility Uniforms also came into use in 1970–71. Camouflage fatigues were sometimes worn, consisting of Tigerstripe patterns from the United States, Thailand (Thai Tadpole and the so-called "Rubber" Tigerstripe variant) and South Vietnam (Tadpole Sparse), and Highland patterns (ERDL 1948 Leaf pattern or "Woodland pattern"), the latter being either furnished by the same sources or locally produced. Olive green U.S. M-1951 field jackets were also issued to all-ranks.

=== Headgear ===
Laotian Navy Officers and Petty Officers initially received a service peaked cap copied after the French M1927 pattern (Casquette d'officier Mle 1927) in both Navy blue and white summer top versions with a black lacquered leather peak and gold cord chinstrap, to wear with the Beige-Khaki service dress and the white high-collared full dress uniforms, respectively, and later with the Navy blue overseas service uniform. The peaked caps were worn with a gold wreathed foul anchor embroidered on black, set on a black round-shaped background patch based on the standard French Navy cap badge. After September 1961, the MRL adopted a new service peaked cap with flat crown slightly raised at the front – similar to that worn by U.S. Navy officers – and replaced the earlier wreathed foul anchor badge with a gilt metal cap badge featuring an anchor superimposed on a spinning Buddhist "Wheel of Law" (Chakra) whose design recalled a circular saw. The new MRL service peaked cap came in both khaki, Navy blue, and white versions, with a gold cord chinstrap and plain black leather peak for petty officers whereas Junior officers' caps had gold embroidered flame decoration on the black leather peak and a gold braid chinstrap. French M1946 and M1957 light khaki sidecaps (Bonnet de police de toile kaki clair Mle 1946 and Bonnet de police de toile kaki clair Mle 1957) were also worn by all-ranks. A French-style Navy blue Sailor cap (Bachi) with a distinctive scarlet red and white oval Cockade on top and an inscribed black silk ribbon (tally) tied around the base bearing the "MRL" title in Lao script, was worn with both the Beige-Khaki and Navy blue overseas service uniforms by enlisted personnel.

Laotian Navy personnel frequently wore in the field a mixture of French M1946 "Gourka" light Khaki tropical berets (Bérét de toile kaki clair Mle 1946), baseball cap-style Khaki cotton field caps, and French M1949 bush hats (French: Chapeau de brousse Mle 1949) in Khaki or Drab green cotton cloth. During the 1960s and early 1970s, a wide range of OG Boonie hats and baseball caps from the United States, South Vietnam and Thailand were adopted by MRL Ratings and enlisted men. The RLA general service beret made of scarlet red wool was also adopted by some MRL officers. It was worn pulled to the left in typical French fashion with the standard MRL beret badge placed above the right eye, which consisted of a simple metal circle bearing a foul anchor, issued in gilt metal for officers. A miniature pin-on silver metal version of the FAR cap badge edged scarlet red was worn placed on the front panel of OG baseball caps by both Ratings and enlisted ranks.

The steel helmet models worn by Laotian Navy vessel crews in the mid-1950s were the WWII-vintage U.S. M-1 or the newer French M1951 NATO (Casque Mle 1951 OTAN) models, standard issue in the ANL. In the later 1960s, the MRL standardized on the M-1 1964 model provided with the U.S. Army M59 Mitchell "Clouds" camouflage pattern cover (usually removed on the field), though many boat crewmen retained the older American and French steel helmets throughout the War.

=== Footwear ===
Brown low laced leather shoes were prescribed to wear with the Laotian Navy Beige-Khaki service/work uniform for all-ranks and white ones with the MRL "dress whites" white cotton full dress for formal occasions, whilst black shoes were worn with the MRL Navy blue overseas service uniforms. On the field, Laotian seamen initially wore brown leather U.S. Army Service Shoes, brown leather U.S. M-1943 Combat Service Boots, French M1953 brown leather "Rangers" (French: Rangers modéle 1953) and French M1917 brown leather hobnailed ankle boots (French: Brodequins modéle 1917), or French Pataugas olive canvas-and-rubber jungle boots, replaced by flip-flops and leather peasant sandals while in garrison. After 1960, the MRL adopted as regulation footwear black leather combat boots – the early U.S. Army M-1962 "McNamara" model and the later M-1967 model with DMS "ripple" pattern rubbler sole, together with limited quantities of U.S. Jungle boots, and local copies of both the Canadian Bata tropical boots and South Vietnamese black canvas-and-rubber Indigenous Combat Boots.

=== Navy ranks ===
Initially, the Laotian Navy wore the same rank insignia as their French and ANL counterparts, whose sequence followed closely the French Navy pattern. Junior officers (Officiers supérieurs et officiers subalternes) and petty officers' (Officiers mariniers) ranks were worn on black removable shoulder boards (pattes d'épaule) or shoulder strap slides (passants d'épaule) similar to the Army pattern, with the addition of a foul anchor on the inner end. NCOs and enlisted men (Quartier-maîtres et matelots) wore metal or cloth chevrons on both upper sleeves or pinned to the chest.

In 1959 the Royal Lao Army (RLA) adopted a new distinctively Laotian-designed system of military ranks, which became in September 1961 the standard rank chart for all branches of service of the newly created Royal Lao Armed Forces. Under the new regulations, MRL officers were now entitled to wear on their service or dress uniforms stiffened red shoulder boards edged with gold braid identical to the standard RLA pattern. Junior officers added an appropriate number of five-pointed gold stars to their boards whilst petty officers' wore chevrons on the upper sleeve or diagonal bars on the lower sleeve. Enlisted men wore no insignia.

In the field, Laotian naval officers had their shoulder boards initially replaced by either shoulder strap slides or a single chest tab (patte de poitrine) pinned to the shirt's front fly following French Army practice. By the late 1960s, the MRL adopted the same American-style system as their RLA counterparts, in which metal pin-on or embroidered cloth rank insignia – either in yellow-on-green full-colour or black-on-green subdued form – were worn on both collars by Ratings and on the right collar only by enlisted ranks, although metal rank insignia could also be worn pinned directly to the shoulder straps as per in the Army and the RLAF.

=== Rank insignia ===
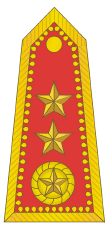
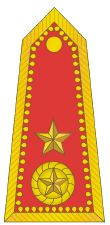
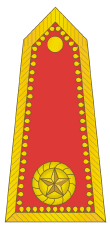
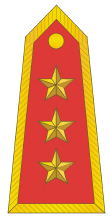
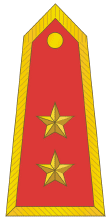
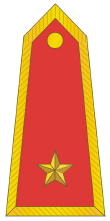
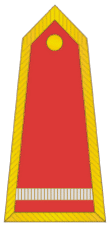
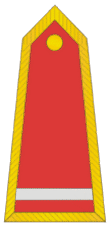
Royal Lao Navy
Royal Lao Navy	Captain; Phan Êek	Commander; Phãvã thõ	Lieutenant commander Phãvã tri	Lieutenant; Rüa ëk	Lieutenant junior grade Rüa thõ	Ensign; Rüa trï	Midshipman 2 Thahanheu song	Midshipman 1 Thahanheu nung

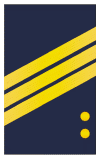
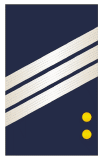
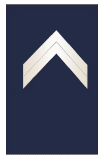
Royal Lao Navy				No insignia
Royal Lao Navy	Master chief petty officer Phakhian naïrüa ëk	Chief petty officer Phakhian naïrüa thõ	Petty officer 2nd class Phakhian nairüa trï	Able seaman Phonthahan

=== Branch and unit insignia ===
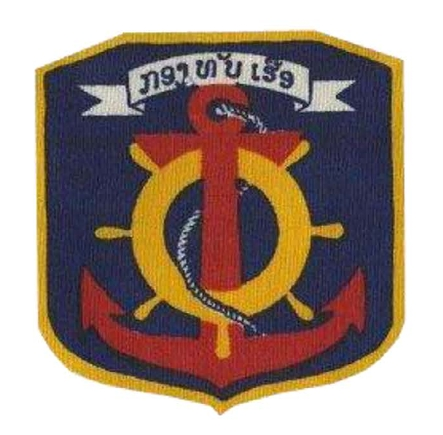
Royal Lao Navy shoulder patch 1961–1975

There were no arm-of-service designations as such in the Royal Lao Navy, although when wearing Beige-Khaki service dress or U.S. OG jungle fatigues, naval personnel skills and trades were identified by collar badges, in either metal pin-on or cloth embroidered versions. These were worn on the left collar only by Ratings and on both collars by enlisted ranks as per in the RLA.

Following the French example, Laotian Navy officers initially wore metal riverine squadron insignia suspended from pocket hangers over their right breast button; enlisted personnel wore cloth versions on the left shoulder. By the 1960s, pocket hangers had been phased out in the MRL and all ranks wore cloth embroidered or printed shoulder riverine squadron insignia. All Laotian naval personnel wore on the upper left shoulder the same MRL insignia, consisting of a red foul anchor superimposed on a yellow six-spoked helm wheel, surmounted by a white scroll bearing the "MRL" title in Lao script inscribed in black, printed on a Navy blue shield-shaped patch edged yellow. White, yellow and subdued nametapes were occasionally worn above either the left or the right shirt (or jacket) pocket on field dress; black plastic nameplates with white lettering were worn with the service and dress uniforms.

== See also ==
- Brown-water navy
- Khmer National Navy
- Lao People's Navy
- Laotian Civil War
- List of weapons of the Laotian Civil War
- Mobile Riverine Force
- Republic of Vietnam Navy
- Vietnam People's Navy
- Vietnam War
