= September 1961 =

Month of 1961

| << | September 1961 | | | | | >> |
| Su | Mo | Tu | We | Th | Fr | Sa |
| | | | | | 1 | 2 |
| 3 | 4 | 5 | 6 | 7 | 8 | 9 |
| 10 | 11 | 12 | 13 | 14 | 15 | 16 |
| 17 | 18 | 19 | 20 | 21 | 22 | 23 |
| 24 | 25 | 26 | 27 | 28 | 29 | 30 |

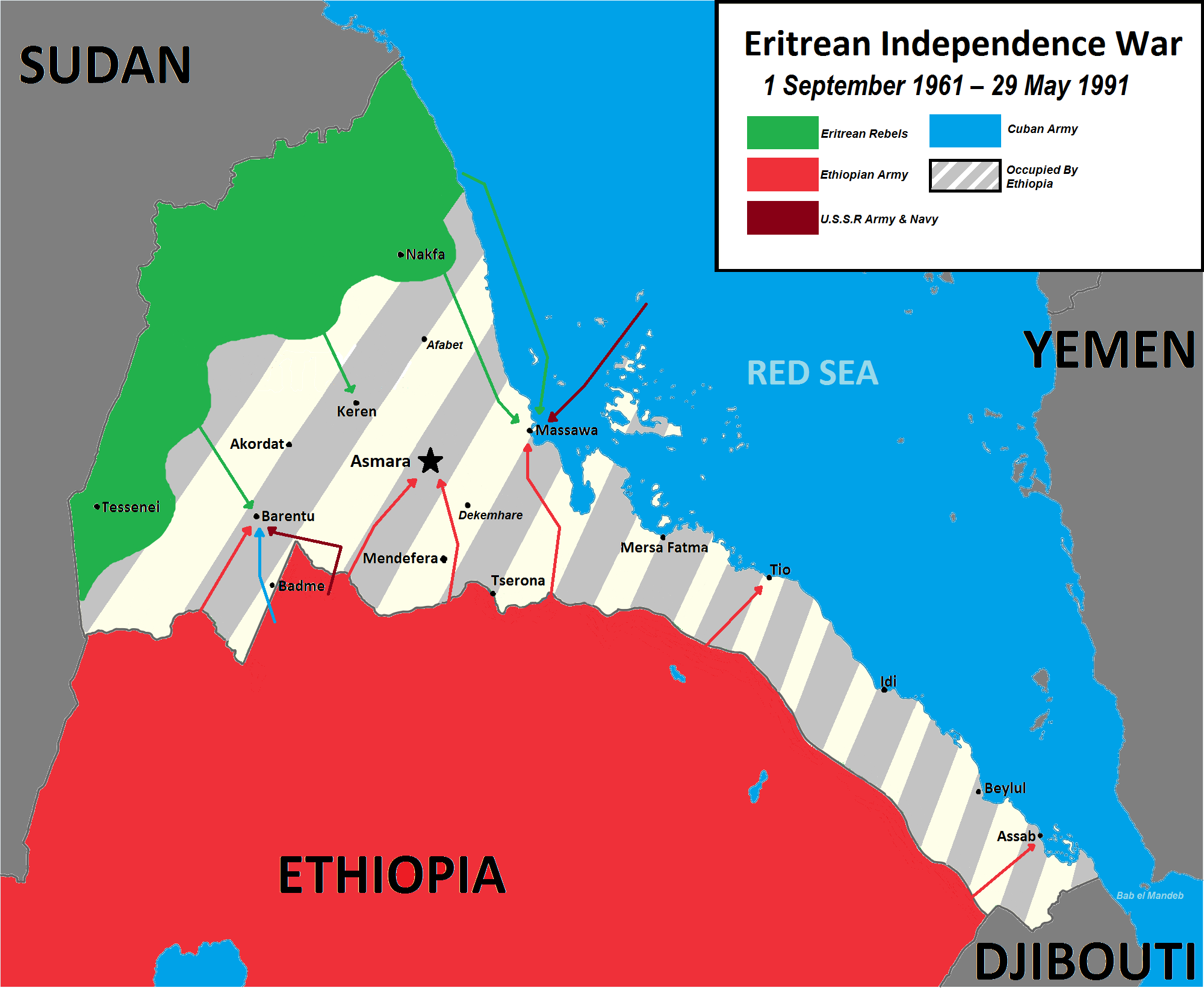
September 1, 1961: Eritrea (green) begins 29 year fight for independence from Ethiopia

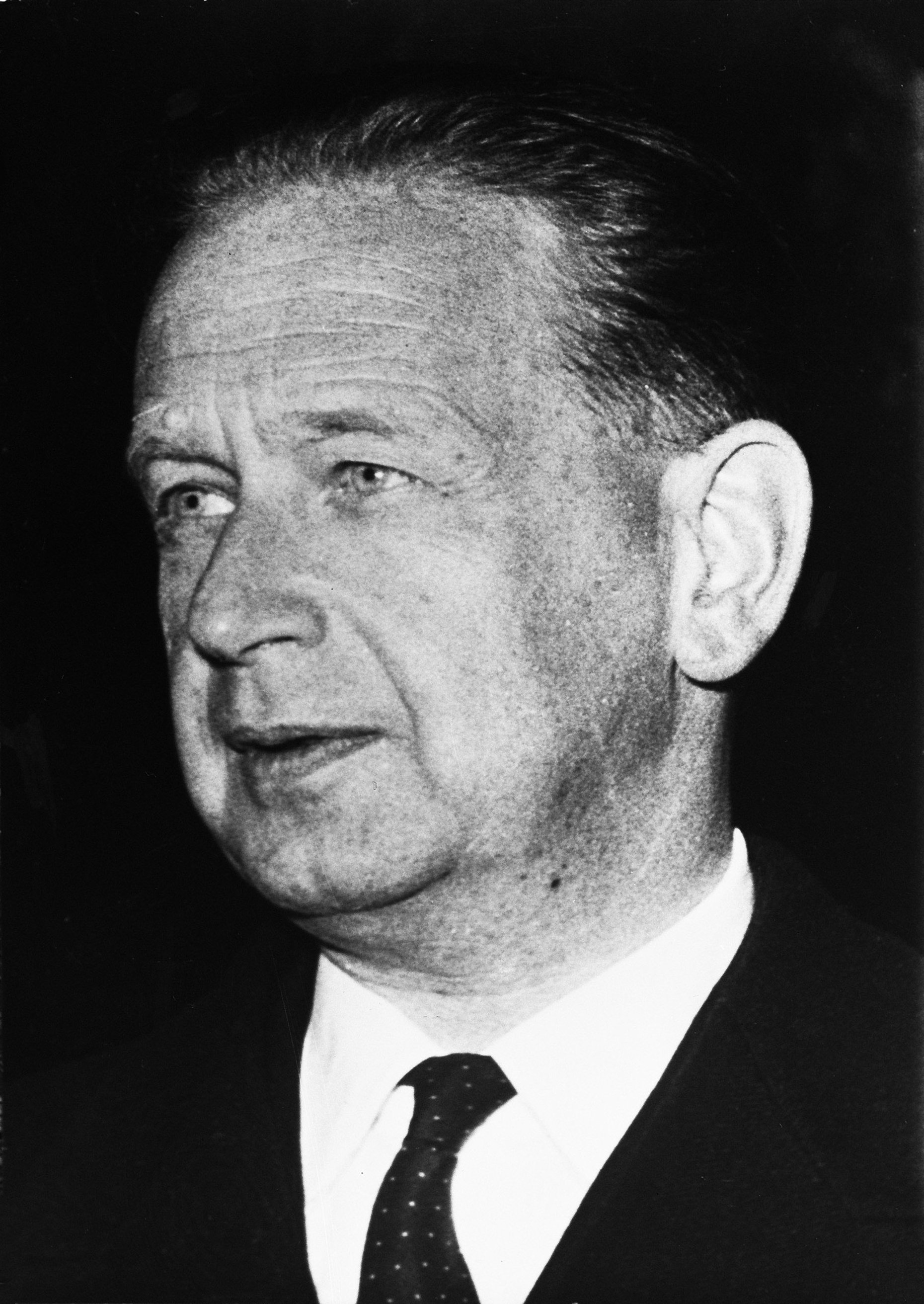
September 18, 1961: UN Secretary-General Hammarskjöld killed in plane crash

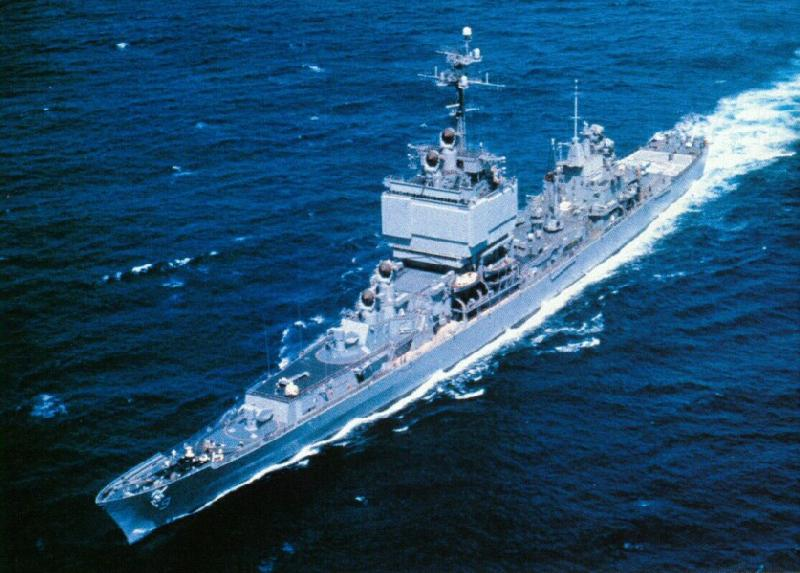
September 9, 1961: USS Long Beach, world's first nuclear-powered surface ship, commissioned

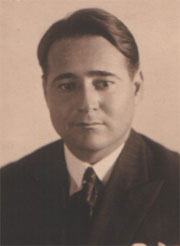
September 17, 1961: Turkey's ex-premier Menderes revived from drug overdose, then hanged

The following events occurred in September 1961:

== September 1, 1961 (Friday) ==
- The Eritrean War of Independence began in northeastern Africa with the Battle of Adal. The first shot was fired by an Eritrean Liberation Front member Hamid Idris Awate, leader of a group of 11 fighters, against Ethiopian government forces at the Barka district. Awate would be killed in 1962, but the ELF would continue to gather members.
- All 78 people on TWA Flight 529 were killed when the airline crashed at 2:05 a.m. local time, four minutes after taking off from Chicago's Midway Airport. The Constellation airplane impacted in a cornfield near Hinsdale, Illinois. At the time, the accident was the worst single plane disaster in American history. A later investigation concluded that the accident happened after a bolt fell off of the elevator boost system, causing the plane to suddenly pitch upward and stall.
- The first meeting of the Non-Aligned Movement took place in Belgrade as the leaders of 24 nations, aligned to neither the U.S. nor the USSR, gathered for a five-day conference hosted by Yugoslavia's President Josip Broz Tito.
- The Soviet Union resumed nuclear testing after a moratorium of three years. Neither the U.S. nor the USSR had exploded a nuclear bomb since 1958. The Soviets exploded 45 bombs over 65 days.
- The Federation of Malaya signed an agreement giving Singapore the right to draw up to 86 million gallons of water per day collectively from the Tebrau River, the Scudai River, the Pontian Reservoir, and the Gunung Pulai Reservoir, until 2011.
- The Jülich radio transmitter was handed over to the Deutsche Bundespost (German Federal Post) to establish the German foreign broadcasting service, "Deutsche Welle".
- Born: Dee Dee Myers, U.S. journalist and first woman to serve as the White House Press Secretary from 1993 to 1994; in Quonset Point, Rhode Island
- Died:
  - Eero Saarinen, 51, Finnish-born American architect and designer known for the Gateway Arch in St. Louis and the Dulles International Airport Main Terminal outside Washington, D.C.; Saarinen, who had been hospitalized since August 21, died the day after undergoing an operation for a brain tumor at the University of Michigan Medical Center in Ann Arbor, Michigan.
  - William Z. Foster, 80, American politician and former General Secretary of the Communist Party USA from 1924 to 1957. In the 1932 U.S. presidential election, Foster received 103,307 votes. Foster had been hospitalized in Moscow at the time of his death.

== September 2, 1961 (Saturday) ==
- Meeting in Brasília, Brazil's Chamber of Deputies voted 233 to 55 to amend that nation's constitution to create a parliamentary system of government, to provide for a Prime Minister of Brazil, and to weaken the powers of the President to no more than a figurehead. The vote took place after an all-night debate, in that the ruling military junta refused to allow Vice-president João Goulart, believed to be a leftist, to succeed recently resigned President Jânio Quadros. The parliamentary system of Brazilian government, unique in South America, lasted for 16 months until abolished in a plebiscite in 1963.
- Bangladesh Agricultural University was formally created as East Pakistan Agricultural University, with a College of Veterinary Science and Animal Husbandry at Mymensingh.
- Born: Eugenio Derbez, Mexican actor, comedian and filmmaker; in Mexico City

== September 3, 1961 (Sunday) ==
- United Kingdom Prime Minister Harold Macmillan and United States President John F. Kennedy issued a joint proposal to Soviet Premier Nikita Khrushchev, "that their three governments agree, effective immediately, not to conduct nuclear tests which take place in the atmosphere and produce radioactive fall-out", and dropping previous requests for inspection. Khrushchev rejected the proposal, but the U.S., USSR and the UK would later sign the Nuclear Test Ban Treaty in 1963.
- The minimum wage in the United States was raised to $1.15 an hour. All covered persons hired on or after that date would still receive the previous minimum of $1.00 an hour. Minimum wage 50 years later would be $7.25 an hour.
- The Vencedor, a boat carrying more than 200 persons on a Sunday excursion to a festival in La Bocana, Colombia, sank off the coast of Buenaventura, drowning an estimated 150 people.
- Australian racing driver Bill Pitt, driving a Jaguar Mark 1 3.4, won the 1961 Australian Touring Car Championship at the Lowood circuit in Queensland.
- Died: Richard Mason, 26, a British explorer who had been leading the 10-man Iriri River Expedition in Central Brazil, was ambushed by a hunting party of at least 15 members of the Panará tribe, who had had no previous contact with the outside world. In accordance with their customs, the Panará laid their weapons next to Mason's body— 15 clubs, and 40 "seven foot long bamboo arrows".

== September 4, 1961 (Monday) ==
- The United States Agency for International Development (USAID) was authorized by the signing into law of the Foreign Assistance Act of 1961, which authorized the spending of $4,253,500,000 for economic development and non-military aid to foreign nations. USAID itself was established on November 3.
- Richard M. Nixon, former U.S. vice-president and future president of the United States, made a hole-in-one while playing golf at the Bel-Air Country Club, on the 155-yard third hole. Nixon joked, "It's the greatest thrill of my life. Even better than being elected." The only other U.S. president to accomplish the rare feat was Gerald R. Ford, who, like Nixon, aced within a year after losing a presidential election, on June 8, 1977.
- Born: Cédric Klapisch, French film director; in Neuilly-sur-Seine, Hauts-de-Seine département
- Died: Charles D. B. King, 85, President of Liberia from 1920 to 1930

== September 5, 1961 (Tuesday) ==
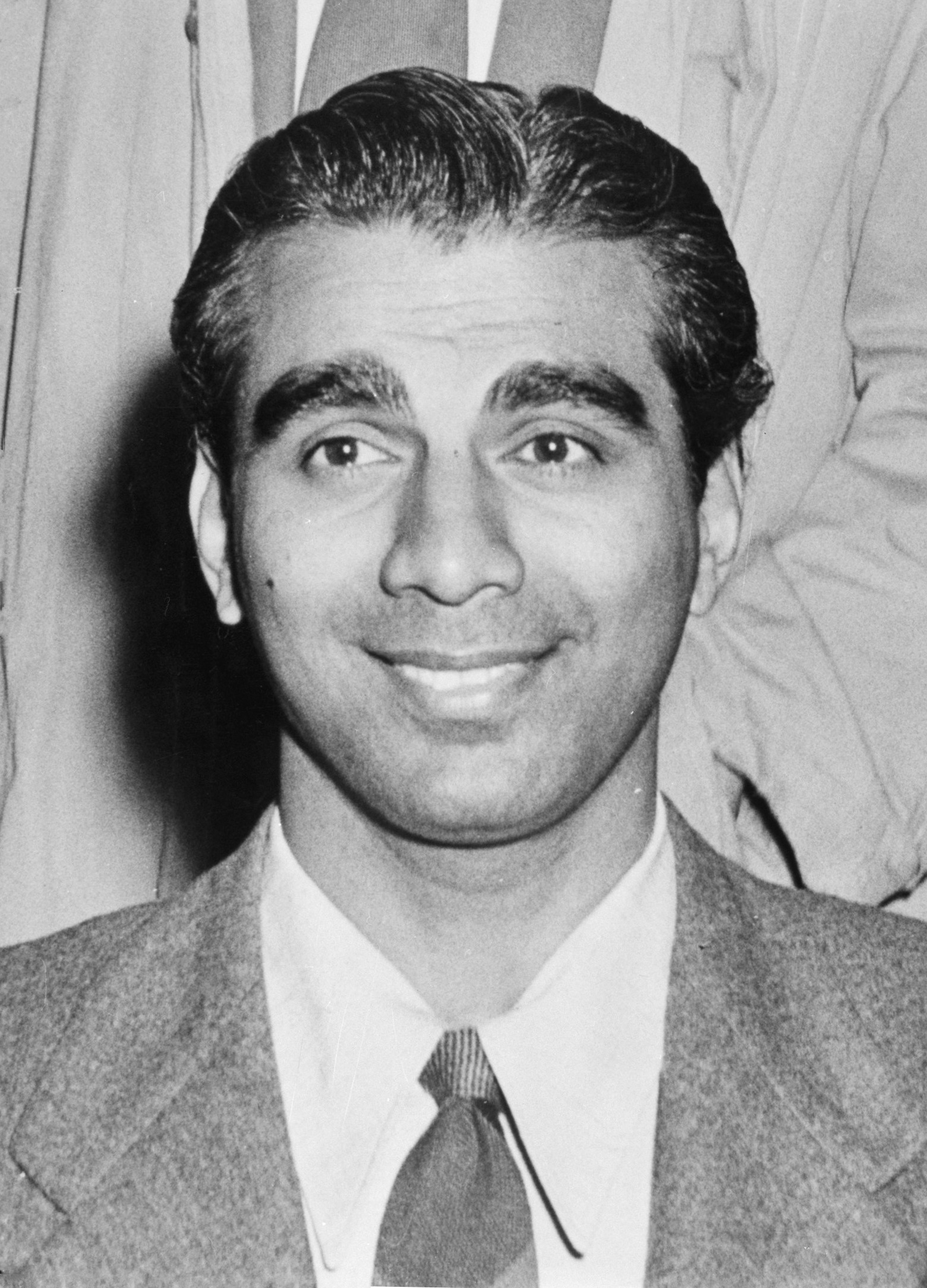
Jagan

- Marxist Cheddi Jagan was sworn in as the first Premier of British Guiana (now Guyana), after his Progressive Peoples Party won the nation's first general elections since Britain had allowed the colony internal self-government.
- The first Football League Cup competition in England was won in Birmingham by Aston Villa over Rotherham United in the second leg of the two-match series. Playing at Millmoor in Rotherham, South Yorkshire, Rotherham had won the first match, 2–0, on August 22. Because scoring was based on the aggregate of the scores of the two matches, Aston Villa needed to score at least two goals more than Rotherham to avoid losing. At the end of 90 minutes, Aston Villa was ahead 2–0 and the aggregate was 2–2, requiring extra time. Peter McParland scored in the 109th minute for Aston Villa's 3–2 victory in the sum of two games.
- Skyjacking, the act of hijacking an airplane, was made a federal crime by the United States, punishable by 20 years to life in prison, and, in some cases, execution. The law also provided a penalty of $1,000 for illegally carrying a concealed weapon onto an aircraft, and up to five years in prison for giving false information to investigators.
- U.S. President John F. Kennedy announced that the United States would end its own moratorium on nuclear testing after three years, stating, "We have no other choice." The announcement followed the third atomic test in the Soviet Union in one week.
- The first of three rocket sled tests were conducted by NASA at the Naval Ordnance Test Station to study the Project Mercury launch vehicle-spacecraft, clamp-ring separation.
- The United States reactivated Phalsbourg-Bourscheid Air Base in response to the Berlin Crisis.
- Born: Marc-André Hamelin, Canadian pianist and composer; in Montreal

== September 6, 1961 (Wednesday) ==
- Afghanistan broke off diplomatic relations with Pakistan. With the border closed at the time that the Afghans were preparing to ship their two major export crops (grapes and pomegranates) through Pakistan to India, the Soviet Union offered to ship the perishables by air. Relations were restored in May 1963, but Afghanistan had become dependent on the Soviets for aid.
- A secured telephone line between the White House in Washington, D.C., and the Admiralty House in London, was set up in order for the U.S. president and the British prime minister to communicate directly, in real time, with their conversations scrambled. President Kennedy and Prime Minister Macmillan would use the line for the first time in October.
- The National Reconnaissance Office began operations in Chantilly, Virginia as a secret U.S. intelligence agency, jointly operated by the CIA and the U.S. Air Force to coordinate satellite surveillance. The existence of the NRO was not publicly revealed until 1992, after the end of the Cold War.
- The Soviet Union began high-altitude nuclear tests, by launching two missiles from Kapustin Yar. A 10.5-kiloton weapon was exploded at an altitude of 14 miles (23 km), and a 40-kiloton weapon at 26 miles (42 km) above the Earth. The United States had done similar testing in 1958.

== September 7, 1961 (Thursday) ==
- American comedian Jack Paar, host of The Tonight Show on NBC television, taped part of his show in front of the Berlin Wall, bringing with him seven U.S. Army officers and another 50 soldiers, along with jeeps and guns. The incident outraged members of Congress and prompted an investigation by the U.S. Department of Defense. A lieutenant colonel was removed from command, and another colonel admonished, but both were cleared three weeks later after a later investigation "showed the two had done nothing wrong". The Tonight Show broadcast on September 12, using the footage, was called by one critic "as dreary and dull as the Berlin weather".
- Tom and Jerry returned to theaters with their first cartoon short since 1958, Switchin' Kitten. The new creator, Gene Deitch, made 12 more Tom and Jerry shorts through 1962.
- Died: Pieter Gerbrandy, 76, Prime Minister of the Netherlands from 1940 to 1945

== September 8, 1961 (Friday) ==
- France's President Charles de Gaulle escaped an assassination attempt as his limousine took him from Paris to his country home at Colombey-les-Deux-Églises. A bomb with 8 pounds (3.6 kg) of plastique had been placed on the President's route between the cities of Nogent-sur-Seine and Romilly-sur-Seine, and an inflammable mixture exploded in flames as the car passed over. The plastique failed to detonate. There were as many as 30 attempts to kill de Gaulle, of which this attempt and an August 22, 1962, machine gunning of his limousine, came closest to success. After the 1962 attempt, de Gaulle pushed through major constitutional reforms to increase his power.
- German authors K. H. Scheer and Walter Ernstein published Perry Rhodan, der Erbe des Universums (Perry Rhodan, the Heir of the Universe), introducing the first adventure of the space opera series Perry Rhodan. By the end of the 20th century, Rhodan would appear in more than 2000 novels.
- A report was made on possible technical advances as a result of the Project Mercury development program.
- Born: Gina Belafonte, American actress, film and stage producer; in New York City as the daughter of singer and actor Harry Belafonte

== September 9, 1961 (Saturday) ==
- Helen North, with 8 children, and U.S. Navy CPO Frank Beardsley, with 10 children, were married in Carmel, California. The Beardsleys then had two more children, and Mrs. Beardsley later wrote about the large family in the book Who Gets the Drumstick?, which was adapted into the 1968 film Yours, Mine and Ours, starring Lucille Ball and Henry Fonda as Mr. and Mrs. Beardsley.
- During a visit to Lenin's Tomb in Moscow, a woman identified only as L.A. Smirnova broke the protective glass around Vladimir Lenin's sarcophagus, spat on his corpse, and yelled "Take that, you bastard!". The incident was not reported at the time, but found later in a declassified pretrial investigation by the KGB.
- Iraq's Premier Abd al-Karim Qasim ordered aerial bombardment of Kurdish territory in the northern part of the nation, beginning the First Iraqi–Kurdish War that would last for eight and a half years before the signing of an agreement granting the Kurds autonomy on March 11, 1970.
- Steam locomotives were fully withdrawn from London Underground passenger services when British Railways took over operations of the Metropolitan line. Steam locomotives were used for freight until 1971.
- USS Long Beach, a guided missile cruiser and the first nuclear-powered surface warship, was commissioned.

== September 10, 1961 (Sunday) ==
- At the F1 Italian Grand Prix at Monza 18 spectators and driver Wolfgang von Trips of West Germany were killed when Trips lost control of his Scuderia Ferrari. Eight people survived their injuries. The crash happened on the second lap, when Von Trips was struck from behind by Jim Clark's Lotus. The race continued for the next two hours, with the bodies of the dead covered with newspapers and not moved until after the race's end. Prior to the final race of the season, Von Trips had been in the lead for the World Driving Championship. The race win, and the title, went instead to Phil Hill.
- All 83 people aboard a chartered Presidential Airlines flight were killed shortly after the plane took off from Shannon Airport in Ireland. The passengers were mostly women and children of U.S. Army personnel, on their way back to the United States.
- Born: Alberto Núñez Feijóo, Spanish Galician politician who was president of the Regional Government of Galicia from 2009 to 2022; in Ourense, Spain
- Died: Bob Hayward, 33, considered at the time the world's foremost hydroplane racer, was killed while racing at the Silver Cup Regatta on the Detroit River. Piloting the boat Miss Supertest II, Hayward was attempting to pass two other competitors as they approached a curve in the river, ran out of room, and turned hard right to avoid a collision. The hydroplane, going at 135 miles per hour (217 km/h), went out of control. Hayward, who had won the Harmsworth Cup for Canada the month before, died instantly of a broken neck.

== September 11, 1961 (Monday) ==
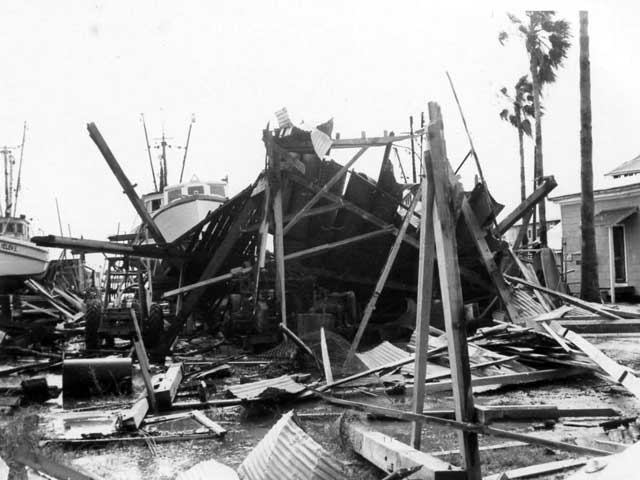
Destruction after America's largest evacuation

- After what was described at the time as "the greatest evacuation in U.S. history"., when more than 300,000 residents of Texas and Louisiana, and perhaps as many as 500,000 fled the area, Hurricane Carla struck Texas at 2:00 p.m., with winds of 173 miles per hour (278 km/h). Coming as a Category 5 storm, Carla weakened just before landfall at Port O'Connor and Port Lavaca, Texas, the largest on record in the Atlantic basin at the time. The estimated damage was $326 million in U.S. dollars, equivalent to $3.4 billion dollars in 2024.
- The made-for-television documentary film The Rejected, was produced for KQED in San Francisco by John W. Reavis. The film is notable as the first documentary program on homosexuality broadcast on American television.
- The World Wildlife Fund (now referred to as the World Wide Fund for Nature) was founded, with the opening of an office in Morges, Switzerland, and with Prince Bernhard of the Netherlands serving as its first President.
- In quadrennial voting in Norway for the 150 seats in the Storting, the Arbeiderpartiet (Labor Party) lost four seats and its majority, finishing with 74, but Prime Minister Einar Gerhardsen was able to retain his office.
- The Austrian television channel ORF2 was launched under the name Versuchsprogramm, as a technical test programme.
- Born:
  - E. G. Daily, American actress, voice actress and singer; in Los Angeles
  - Virginia Madsen, American actress and film producer; in Chicago

== September 12, 1961 (Tuesday) ==
- Five days before they were to report to Pensacola, Florida for training to become the first women astronauts, the 12 candidates who had been selected from all applicants received a telegram stating "Regret to advise you that arrangements at Pensacola cancelled. Probably will not be possible to carry out this part of the program." It would be another 22 years before an American woman, Sally Ride would go into outer space, although the Soviets would send two women cosmonauts into orbit before then (Valentina Tereshkova in 1963 and Svetlana Savitskaya in 1982).
- All 77 people on Air France Flight 2005 were killed when the Caravelle jet crashed in fog on the approach to Rabat in Morocco at the end of its flight from France.

African and Malagasy Union

- The African and Malagasy Union, consisting of 12 French-speaking African nations that had signed an agreement at Brazzaville on December 19, 1960, came into existence. The initial members were Cameroon, the Central African Republic, Chad, the Republic of the Congo ("Congo-Brazzaville"), Dahomey (now Benin), Gabon, the Côte d'Ivoire, Madagascar, Mauritania, Niger, Senegal and Upper Volta (now Burkina Faso).
- János Kádár, General Secretary of the Hungarian Socialist Workers' Party since 1956, became Prime Minister of Hungary for the second time in his career, replacing the elderly Ferenc Münnich. Kádár would serve as Prime Minister until 1965, retaining the more powerful post as the Party General Secretary until 1988.
- Frederick College, located in Portsmouth, Virginia, became a four-year college, three years after starting in 1958 as a two-year school. The college would close its doors at the end of the 1967–68 academic year.

== September 13, 1961 (Wednesday) ==
- SIOP-62, the American options for nuclear war, was presented to President Kennedy in a top secret briefing from General Lyman Lemnitzer, the Chairman of the Joint Chiefs of Staff. The operational plan, drawn up on April 15, provided 14 options for responding to a nuclear attack, and the 14th option, recommended by General Lemnitzer, was to explode 3,267 nuclear bombs on targets in the Soviet Union, as well as the Warsaw Pact nations and Communist China. Kennedy was reportedly furious about the lack of flexibility in the plan, which contemplated obliteration of the enemy with the expectation that the United States and its allies would sustain massive destruction as well.
- The first Mercury spacecraft to attain Earth orbit, the uncrewed Mercury-Atlas 4 was launched from Cape Canaveral. The mission lasted one hour and 49 minutes. After one orbit, the spacecraft splashed down in the Atlantic Ocean 161 miles (259 km) east of Bermuda and was recovered by the USS Decatur (DD-936). At the time, the U.S. had not yet put a man into orbit.
- Operation Morthor was launched at 4:00 a.m. local time in the Congo, with United Nations troops attacking the secessionist province of Katanga.
- In the final of West Germany's DFB-Pokal soccer football tournament, SV Werder Bremen defeated 1. FC Kaiserslautern, 2–0.
- Born: Dave Mustaine, American musician and co-founder, frontman, primary songwriter and sole consistent member of the thrash metal band Megadeth; in La Mesa, California

== September 14, 1961 (Thursday) ==
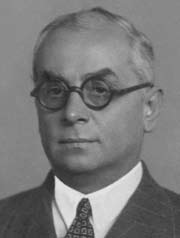
Ex-President Bayar, spared

- The new military government of Turkey sentenced 15 members of the previous government to death, including former Prime Minister Adnan Menderes and former President Celâl Bayar. Menderes was hanged 3 days later, while Bayar's sentence was commuted.
- Born:
  - Wendy Thomas, daughter of American businessman Dave Thomas, the founder of the fast food brand Wendy's; in Columbus, Ohio
  - Freeman Mbowe, Tanzanian politician and 2005 presidential candidate; in Tanganyika

== September 15, 1961 (Friday) ==
- Citing U.S. Congressman Chet Holifield of California as their source, Miami News columnists Robert S. Allen and Paul Scott, broke the frightening story that the Soviet Union planned to explode a nuclear warhead on the Moon. Firing nuclear-tipped rockets at Earth's satellite in 1961 and 1962, according to the story, the Soviets planned to use the explosions on the lunar surface for scientific purposes, with the goal of landing a Soviet cosmonaut on the Moon by 1965.
- Two weeks after the Soviet Union resumed nuclear testing, the United States carried out Operation Nougat and exploded a nuclear bomb for the first time since October 30, 1958. While the Soviet tests were atmospheric, the American tests were conducted underground at the Nevada Test Site.
- In Ireland, the Government of the 16th Dáil, with Seán Lemass as the Taoiseach (prime minister) left office, as Ireland's parliament adjourned for the last time prior to the October 4 election.
- Born: Dan Marino, American NFL quarterback, 1984 NFL Most Valuable Player and enshrinee in the Pro Football Hall of Fame; in Pittsburgh

== September 16, 1961 (Saturday) ==
- A U.S. Navy aircraft attempted a weather control experiment by dropping eight canisters of silver iodide around the eyewall of Hurricane Esther, testing the hypothesis that a storm could be weakened by cloud seeding. The size of the hurricane's eye was observed to increase with an accompanying decrease in wind speed, and Project Stormfury was commenced the following year. Data was collected on four hurricanes between 1963 and 1971, ultimately showing that observed decreases in wind speed had been the result of natural changes rather than seeding.
- Typhoon Nancy struck Osaka and the island of Honshu in Japan (where it was referred to as the Muroto II Typhoon), with winds of 135 miles per hour. The typhoon killed 203 people and caused $500,000,000 in damage.
- Born: Andrey Illarionov, Russian economist; in Leningrad, Russian SFSR, Soviet Union
- Died:
  - Hasan Polatkan, 46, former Finance Minister of Turkey, and Fatin Rüştü Zorlu, 51, former Foreign Minister of Turkey. Both Zorlu and Polatkan were hanged at the prison on the island of Yassıada after being sentenced to death on charges of malfeasance in office.

== September 17, 1961 (Sunday) ==
- In elections in West Germany, for the 499-member Bundestag, the CDU/CSU coalition, led by Chancellor Konrad Adenauer, its absolute majority, of 270 and lost 28 seats to finish with 242 seats. The Social Democratic Party and the Free Democratic Party had 190 and 67 seats respectively. Chancellor Adenauer forged a deal with the Free Democrats and would be re-elected as Chancellor by the Bundestag on November 7.
- All 37 people on Northwest Orient Airlines Flight 706 were killed when the Lockheed L-188 Electra turboprop crashed shortly after taking off from Chicago's O'Hare International Airport. Flight 706 was heading toward the third stop on a trip that had started in Milwaukee, with a final scheduled destination of Tampa and Miami. The U.S. Civil Aeronautics Board would conclude on December 10, 1962, that the crash was probably caused by faulty installation of a hydraulic boost system that had been made at Northwest's maintenance center on July 11 and 12, 1961 by different mechanics, noting that "neither mechanic had followed the manual step by step" and that a mechanic unscrewed connectors linking the aileron control system to terminals that absorb slack, and that the screws were never retightened and that "there occurred a gradual unscrewing of the connector until it finally separated from the slack absorber."
- Five of 26 hikers in a tour group at Zion National Park in the U.S. state of Utah were killed by a flash flood. The bodies of Walter Scott, 48, Steve Florence, 13, and Ray Nichols, 17, were discovered the following day. A skull fragment discovered in the Virgin River in 2006 would be identified in 2012 as belonging to Alvin Nelson, 17. The body of Frank Johnson, 17, was never found.
- The Minnesota Vikings played their first regular season NFL game and beat the Chicago Bears in an upset, 37–13. The Bears' coach George Halas would later describe losing to an expansion team as "the most embarrassing defeat of his life".
- The NBC sitcom Car 54, Where Are You?, about two New York City policemen (Joe E. Ross and Fred Gwynne, who later appeared on The Munsters), premiered.
- Died: Adnan Menderes, 62, who had been the first Prime Minister of Turkey to be democratically elected, serving until his overthrow in 1960, was executed for treason. Menderes had attempted suicide by swallowing a bottle of sleeping pills at his prison cell on Yassiada Island. A team of physicians saved his life, then brought him back to consciousness long enough to be transported to the gallows on the island of İmralı.

== September 18, 1961 (Monday) ==
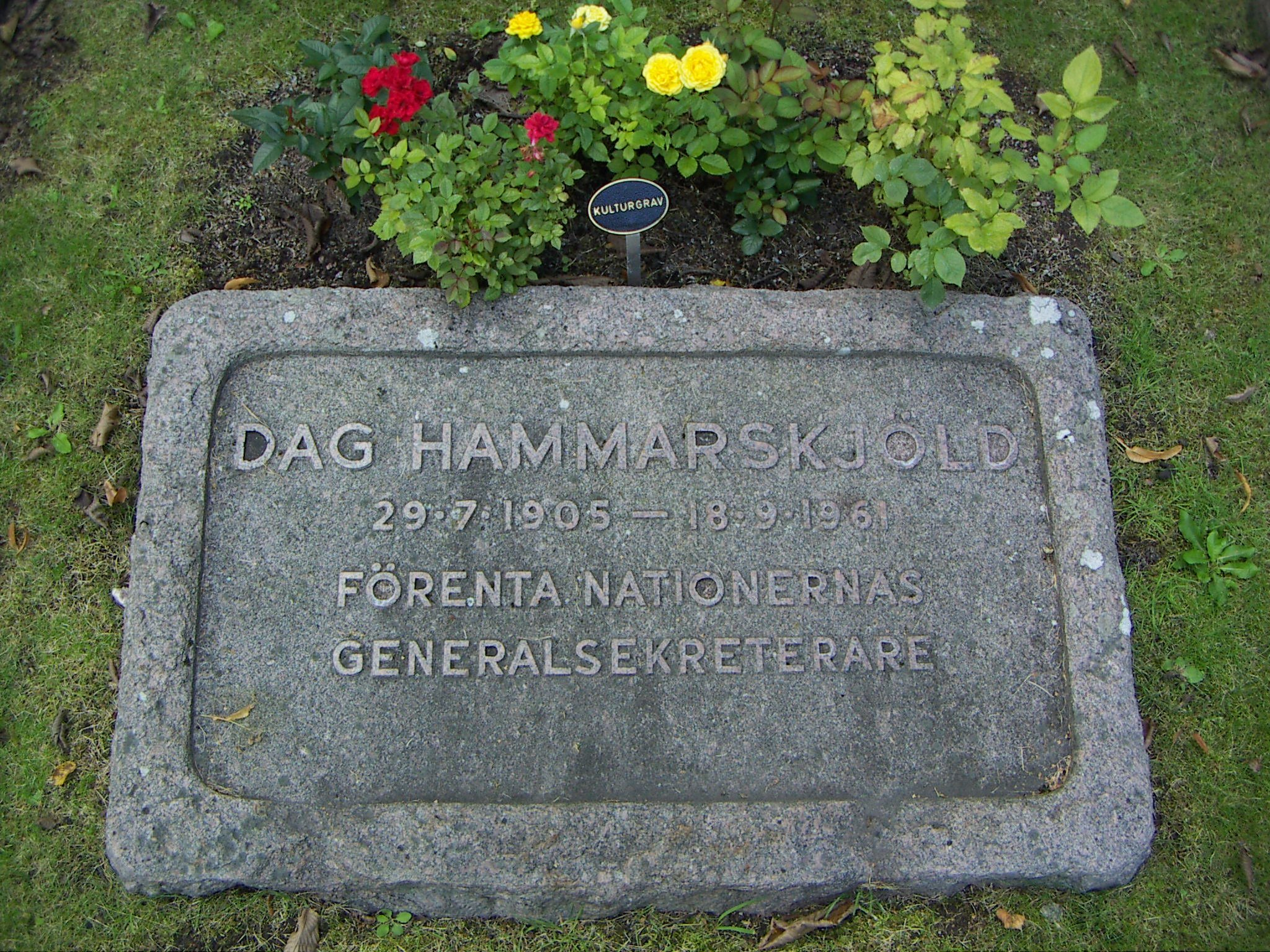
Dag Hammarskjöld's Grave

- Dag Hammarskjöld, the Secretary-General of the United Nations, was killed when his plane crashed while flying from Leopoldville in the Congo to Ndola in Northern Rhodesia (now Zambia). He was on his way to negotiate a cease-fire with Moise Tshombe in the Katanga Province, which had seceded from the Congo. At 12:12 a.m. local time, the DC6-B, operated by Swedish Trans Air, was cleared for a landing at Ndola. Fifteen others died in the crash, which happened after midnight. The wreckage was found 15 hours later on the Northern Rhodesia side of the border, 10 miles (16 km) south of Mufulira. The sole survivor, U.N. Sgt. Harold Julien, was able to tell investigators that Hammarskjold ordered the pilot not to land at Ndola, and that there had been a series of explosions. Badly burned, Sgt. Julien, an American from Miami, died on September 23. Speculation that the crash was not accidental began almost immediately.
- For the first time, troops from North Vietnam seized control of a provincial capital in South Vietnam, capturing Phuoc Vinh in a predawn attack, only 55 miles (89 km) from Saigon. The ARVN recaptured the city the next day, but not before the Governor of the Phuoc Thanh province was publicly beheaded, along with the top military officers, and the government buildings burned.
- Christopher Newport College began its first classes, opening in Newport News, Virginia, with 8 full-time professors and 170 students. Now Christopher Newport University, the college had 4,800 students in 2012.
- Georgia Tech integrated peacefully, as classes began with three African-American freshmen among the new students.
- Born:
  - Lori and George Schappell, American conjoined twins (d. 2024); in West Reading, Pennsylvania
  - James Gandolfini, American actor (The Sopranos) (d. 2013); in Westwood, New Jersey

== September 19, 1961 (Tuesday) ==
- In one of the first reported cases of an "alien abduction", Betty Hill and Barney Hill were returning from a vacation in Canada to their home in Portsmouth, New Hampshire on U.S. Route 3. South of Lancaster, the Hills would later report, they encountered a U.F.O., and had no immediate memory of what happened later until the details were brought out with the aid of hypnotism. In 1966, author John Fuller would turn their story into a best-selling book called The Interrupted Journey: Two Lost Hours "Aboard a Flying Saucer". The Hills' story would become the first of many tales of abduction by extraterrestrials. In 1975, Estelle Parsons and James Earl Jones would portray the Hills in The UFO Incident. Barney would die in 1969, while Betty survived until 2004.

West Indies Federation

Jamaica

- Voters in Jamaica elected to withdraw from the West Indies Federation by a margin of 251,776 to 216,371. With Jamaicans comprising more than half (56%) of the population and a majority of its income, the result was the end of the Federation, and, eventually, 12 independent nations. Eric Williams of Trinidad and Tobago summed up the situation as "One from ten leaves nought."
- NASA Administrator James E. Webb announced that the new Manned Spacecraft Center would be built southeast of Houston, in Harris County, Texas, on 1,000 acres (400 ha) of land donated by Rice University. Later renamed the Lyndon B. Johnson Space Center, the site would serve the Apollo space program as Mission Control, with astronauts referring to it by its location (as in "Houston, we've had a problem" spoken during the Apollo 13 mission). The Space Task Group would move from Langley Field to Houston, Texas.
- Babi Yar, the controversial poem by Yevgeny Yevtushenko, was published in the official Soviet literary magazine Literaturnaya Gazeta, marking the first time that the Holocaust was officially acknowledged in the USSR.

== September 20, 1961 (Wednesday) ==
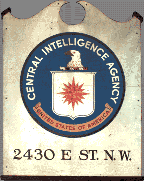
Original sign with seal from the CIA's first building

- The Central Intelligence Agency began moving into its new headquarters in Langley, Virginia, after having been housed in 33 buildings scattered throughout Washington, D.C. (the DCI having been at 2430 E Street N.W.).
- As tensions between the United States and the Soviet Union were escalating, the two nations entered into the McCloy–Zorin Accords, titled "Joint Statement of Agreed Principles for Disarmament Negotiations," with eight points that would be followed in subsequent discussions. U.S. Presidential Adviser John J. McCloy and Deputy Soviet Foreign Minister Valerian Zorin led the delegations from the two countries, promising to the United Nations to work toward the eventual elimination of all weapons of mass destruction.
- In the 154th game of the 1961 Major League Baseball season, Roger Maris hit his 59th home run of the year in the 3rd inning of the New York Yankees game at the Baltimore Orioles. Maris made two more hits into the stands in the 4th and 7th innings, but each was a foul ball. Maris failed to tie or break Babe Ruth's 1927 record of 60 home runs in 154 games but had eight games remaining to play.
- East Germany enacted its first conscription law, making military service mandatory for all men between the ages of 18 and 50 years old. The National People's Army (Nationalen Volksarmee) had formerly been an all-volunteer force.
- Konstantinos Karamanlis resigned as Prime Minister of Greece as elections for parliament were scheduled for October 29. King Paul appointed retired General Konstantinos Dovas to serve as the new Premier until December 4.
- Robert R. Gilruth and other officials of the Space Task Group surveyed the Houston, Texas, area to seek temporary operational quarters while the permanent installation was being constructed.
- The Joey Bishop Show, a situation comedy built around American comedian Joey Bishop, premiered on NBC and would run for four seasons.
- Cutervo National Park was established as the first protected area in Peru, by Law #13964.
- Died:
  - Karl Farr, 52, American guitarist and founder of the country and western group The Sons of the Pioneers. Farr was performing solo at the Eastern States Exhibition in Springfield, Massachusetts when a string broke on his guitar, and he suffered a heart attack while trying to change it. As part of the induction of his group, he entered the Country Music Hall of Fame in 1980.
  - Andrzej Munk, 39, Polish director, was killed in a car crash on his way home from the Auschwitz concentration camp at Oświęcim, where he was shooting the film Passenger.

== September 21, 1961 (Thursday) ==
- D. Brainerd Holmes was appointed NASA's Director of Manned Space Flight Programs. As general manager of Radio Corporation of America's Major Defense Systems Division, Holmes had been project manager of the Ballistic Missile Early Warning System. Congressman George P. Miller (D.-Calif.) succeeded the recently deceased Congressman Overton Brooks of Louisiana as chairman of the House Committee on Science and Astronautics.
- In French Algeria, the Organisation armée secrète (OAS) knocked Algiers television off the air, toppling the transmission tower with bombs moments before it was to broadcast a message from President Charles de Gaulle. OAS leader Raoul Salan then transmitted a speech on the same frequency, taunting de Gaulle and calling for demonstrations against the separation of Algeria from French rule.
- Born: Helen Haines, Australian Member of Parliament since 2019, known for being deliberately run down by a driver on October 19, 2026 outside her office in Wangaratta, Victoria; in Colac, Victoria
- Died: Earle Dickson, 68, American inventor best known for creating the Band-Aid in 1920

== September 22, 1961 (Friday) ==
- The ICC ruled that, effective November 1, all interstate buses in the United States were required to display signs that provided "Seating aboard this vehicle is without regard to race, color, creed, or national origin, by order of the Interstate Commerce Commission." In the same order, the ICC prohibited interstate buses from using "any terminal facilities which are so operated, arranged, or maintained as to involve any separation of any portion thereof, or in the use thereof on the basis of race, color, creed, or national origin." The order was a victory for the Freedom Riders, who suspended further plans to challenge racial segregation on buses and bus terminals.
- At 3:45 a.m., Antonio Abertondo arrived in Dover and became the first person to swim across the English Channel and right back again, resting for only ten minutes between crossings. Abertondo had departed England on September 20 at 8:35 a.m., arriving nearly 19 hours later in Wissant on the coast of France. After his brief break, Abertondo began his swim back to England.
- The Space Task Group announced that a 30-inch (760 mm) diameter balloon would be installed in the Mercury spacecraft to allow for ship recovery should the helicopter be forced to drop the spacecraft, as happened during the Mercury-Redstone 4 (MR-4) recovery operations.
- President Kennedy signed legislation permanently funding the Peace Corps, one week after the House of Representatives had approved the bill, 287–97. The Senate had previously approved the legislation by voice vote.
- Dominic Abata was elected leader of the breakaway cab drivers and mechanics' union in Chicago.
- Died: Marion Davies, 64, American socialite and film actress

== September 23, 1961 (Saturday) ==
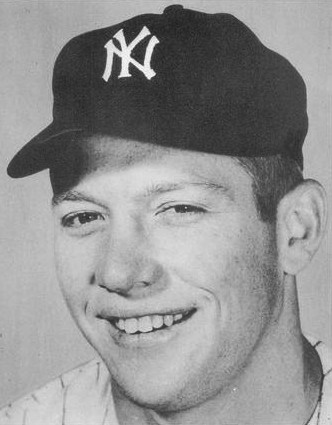
Mantle

- Mickey Mantle hit his 54th home run of the season, while Yankees teammate Roger Maris remained stuck at 59 homers, with six games left in the baseball season. The homer would prove to be Mantle's last that year, as Mantle would suffer a hip infection and be hospitalized five days later.
- NBC Saturday Night at the Movies broke the long-standing feud between the American movie and television industries, showing semi-recent hit films, after coming to an agreement with 20th Century Fox. Beginning in 1956, motion pictures made before 1948 had been shown on TV without the need to compensate the actors. The first offering was the 1953 comedy How to Marry a Millionaire. ABC introduced a Sunday night movie in 1962, NBC had movie nights Monday, Tuesday and Wednesday over the next four years, and CBS started a Thursday night film in 1965.
- Stirling Moss wins the International Gold Cup motor race at Oulton Park.
- Born: William C. McCool, American naval officer and aviator, test pilot, aeronautical engineer, and NASA astronaut who was the pilot of Space Shuttle Columbia mission STS-107. The Columbia disintegrated during reentry into the atmosphere, killing him and 6 other crew members; in San Diego, California

== September 24, 1961 (Sunday) ==
- NASA Administrator James E. Webb announced major organizational changes and top-level appointments to become effective November 1. The new appointments included Directors Ira H. Abbott of the Office of Advanced Research and Technology; Homer E. Newell, Office of Space Sciences; D. Brainerd Holmes, Office of Manned Space Flight; and an as yet unnamed Director of Office of Applications Programs. Thomas F. Dixon was appointed Deputy Associate Administrator, Abe Silverstein was named Director of the Lewis Research Center, and Robert R. Gilruth was chosen Director of the Manned Spacecraft Center.
- Walt Disney's Wonderful World of Color premiered on NBC, with "An Adventure in Color", introduced by Walt Disney himself, who in turn introduced Professor Ludwig Von Drake, the first animated Disney character created for television. The show was credited with doubling the sale of color television sets within its first year, as well as presenting educational and informative programming. The New York Herald Tribune wrote in its review, "Newton Minow can relax," referring to the FCC Commissioner who, on May 9, 1961, had described American television as a "vast wasteland".
- The Deutsche Opernhaus, which had been destroyed during a World War II bombing raid on November 23, 1943, was reopened at its former location on Bismarckstrasse in the Berlin neighborhood of Charlottenburg, as the Deutsche Oper Berlin. The first presentation was Wolfgang Amadeus Mozart's 1787 opera Don Giovanni.

== September 25, 1961 (Monday) ==
- President Kennedy addressed the United Nations about the need for nuclear disarmament, declaring that "Today, every inhabitant of this planet must contemplate that day when this planet may no longer be inhabitable. Every man, woman and child lives under a nuclear sword of Damocles, hanging by the slenderest of threads, capable of being cut at any moment by accident or miscalculation or madness. The weapons of war must be abolished before they abolish us."
- Wisconsin became the first state in the United States to require the installation of seat belts as standard equipment in motor vehicles, as Governor Gaylord Nelson signed into law a bill directing that all 1962 and later model cars and trucks were required to include the safety belts before they could be sold. In the first six months that the law was in effect, all but one belt wearer had survived a car accident in the state.
- By a margin of almost 80%, voters in Rwanda said "no" to continuing the monarchy in a referendum conducted in advance of the African nation's scheduled independence. The Parmehutu (Parti du Mouvement de l' Emancipation Hutu) political party, composed of the majority Hutu tribe, won 35 of the 44 seats in the first Parliament.
- The Hustler, a film about pool players, starring Paul Newman and Jackie Gleason, was released by 20th Century Fox. "The movie transformed American culture in an instant," noted one historian. "Pool halls, pool playing, pool players— all of it, very suddenly, very unexpectedly— became hip."
- Department of the Army Message 578636 designated the green beret as the exclusive headgear of the U.S. Army Special Forces, giving the group their nickname of the "Green Berets".
- In Tacoma, Washington, KBTC-TV went on the air for the first time, as KTPS-TV.
- Born:
  - Mario Díaz-Balart, U.S. Congressman (R-Florida) and son of exiled Cuban Interior Minister Rafael Díaz-Balart; in Fort Lauderdale, Florida
  - Frankie Randall, American boxer, world light welterweight champion from 1994 to 1997 (d. 2020); in Birmingham, Alabama
  - Heather Locklear, American TV actress; in Los Angeles
- Died:
  - Frank Fay, 64, American vaudeville comedian and actor, former husband of actress Barbara Stanwyck, died of a ruptured abdominal aorta.
  - Herbert Lee, 49, American civil rights activist and charter member of the NAACP in Mississippi, was shot and killed by Mississippi state representative E. H. Hurst after the two got into an altercation near Liberty. After hearing from three black and two white witnesses, a coroner's jury concluded that Hurst had been acting in self-defense.

== September 26, 1961 (Tuesday) ==
- In London, at its annual conference, the executive committee of FIFA suspended the Football Association of South Africa from international soccer football competition. At the 1960 meeting in Rome, FIFA had given South Africa one year to adopt a non-discriminatory racial policy.
- Roger Maris hit his 60th home run in a 3–2 win for the Yankees over the Orioles, tying the record set by Babe Ruth in 1927 for most homers in a season. Maris's teammate, Mickey Mantle finished with 54 homers after two competed against each other all season.
- The Arms Control and Disarmament Agency was founded.
- Born: Edward M. Kennedy Jr., American lawyer and politician; in Boston, to Senator Edward "Ted" and Joan Bennett Kennedy
- Died:
  - Bulbul (Murtuza Rza oglu Mammadov), 64, Azerbaijani and Soviet opera and folk singer
  - Charles Wilson, 71, former U.S. Secretary of Defense and former CEO of General Motors

== September 27, 1961 (Wednesday) ==
- Former vice-president Richard M. Nixon, who had narrowly lost the U.S. presidential race in 1960, told a crowd in Los Angeles that he would not run for president in 1964, and that he would run for Governor of California in 1962. After a disastrous campaign, Nixon lost to Governor Pat Brown, but would win the presidency in 1968.
- Rahmankul Kurbanovich Kurbanov replaced Arif Alimovich Alimov as the Premier of the Uzbek Soviet Socialist Republic (now the nation of Uzbekistan).
- Sierra Leone became the 100th member of the United Nations, following unanimous approval by the General Assembly.
- The first episode of TV prime-time cartoon series Top Cat was aired on the ABC network at 8:30 p.m. in the U.S.
- Born: Arturo Beltrán Leyva, Mexican drug trafficker; in Badiraguato, Sinaloa state (shot dead by law enforcement officers, 2009)
- Died:
  - Haji Laq Laq, 63, Indian poet and humorist who wrote in the Urdu language
  - H.D. (Hilda Doolittle), 75, American poet and novelist

== September 28, 1961 (Thursday) ==
UAR

Syria

- The United Arab Republic, which had united Egypt and Syria under Egyptian rule in 1958, was brought to an end when Lt. Col. Abd al-Karim al-Nahlawi led a coup in Damascus and announced that Syria would leave the UAR. President Nasser sent a force of 2,000 Egyptian paratroopers to crush the revolt, but rescinded the order when Syrian commanders in Aleppo and Latakia supported the insurrection. Nasser's chief aide in Syria, Marshal Abd al-Hakim Amer, was put on a plane and sent back to Cairo. The next day, Dr. Maamun al-Kuzbari was named to head the interim government as premier.
- The NBC network medical drama Dr. Kildare, based on a series of novels and films, premiered and began a run of five seasons. The show was followed the same evening by the first episode of the American situation comedy Hazel, based on a cartoon panel by Ted Key in The Saturday Evening Post and starring veteran actress Shirley Booth as the title character, a live-in maid. Hazel would run for five seasons.
- The word "ain't" was accepted into the English language with the publication of the Third Edition of the Merriam-Webster, the first completely new edition since 1944. Merriam President Gordon J. Oallan had announced the controversial decision on September 6, noting that "ain't" was one of thousands of new words that had been added.
- Born: Quentin Kawānanakoa, American politician and member of the House of Kawānanakoa, member of the Hawaii House of Representatives from 1995 to 1999; in Monterey, California

== September 29, 1961 (Friday) ==
- Operating in secrecy, Soviet leader Nikita Khrushchev sent a 26-page private letter to President Kennedy, expressing his regrets over the harsh treatment he had given to Kennedy at their Vienna summit, and seeking a way to resolve the Berlin Crisis. Using the analogy of "Noah's Ark, where both the 'clean' and the 'unclean' found sanctuary" for the world, Khrushchev wrote that regardless of what each side thought of the other, both sides "are all equally interested in one thing, and that is that the Ark should successfully continue its cruise." Concealed in a newspaper, the letter was handed by KGB agent Georgi Bolshakov to presidential press secretary Pierre Salinger in a hotel room in New York City. Kennedy responded with an equally private letter on October 16.
- Minutes after Fidel Castro announced that he was going to "clean up" Havana, the last casinos in Cuba were closed. At the time of the revolution, there had been 25 gambling casinos. Five were left, all in government-operated hotels, at the time of the order.
- Forty-year-old Hawaiian Keo Nakama became the first person to swim from the island of Molokai to Oahu. It took him 15 1/2 hours to cross the treacherous 27-mile (43 km) Ka Iwa Channel.
- Born: Julia Gillard, Welsh-born Australian politician and the 27th Prime Minister of Australia from 2010 to 2013; in Barry, Vale of Glamorgan, Wales

== September 30, 1961 (Saturday) ==
- The Sports Broadcasting Act of 1961 was signed into law by President Kennedy, providing a limited exception to U.S. antitrust law to allow American sports leagues to negotiate TV and radio contracts.
- The Organisation for Economic Co-operation and Development (OECD) was formed, replacing the Organization for European Economic Co-operation (OEEC).
- Born: Eric Stoltz, American film and television actor known for Mask and Pulp Fiction; in Whittier, California
