= Military ranks of the Royal Lao Armed Forces =

The military ranks of the Kingdom of Laos were the military rank insignia used by the Royal Lao Armed Forces from 1955 to 1975. As a former French dominion, the ranks followed that of the French Armed Forces until 1959.

== Commissioned officer ranks ==
The rank insignia of commissioned officers.

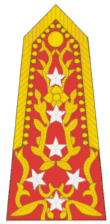
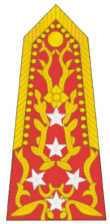
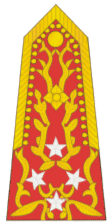
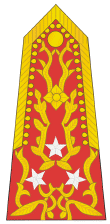
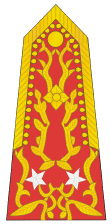
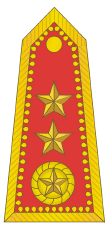
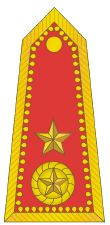
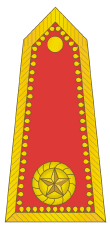
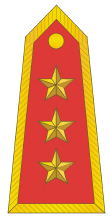
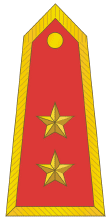
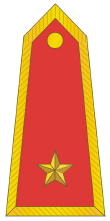
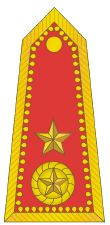
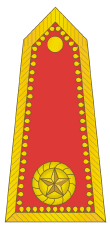
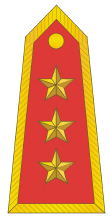
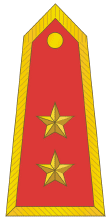
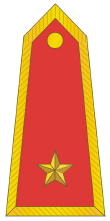
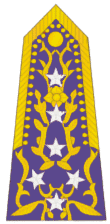
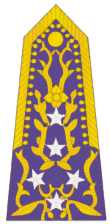
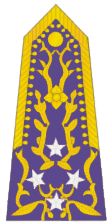
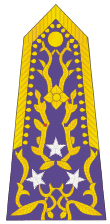
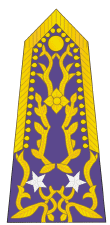
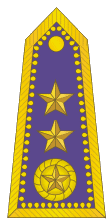
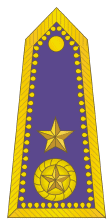
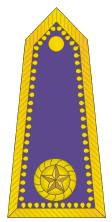
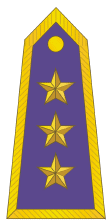
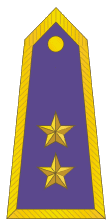
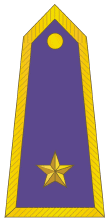
Rank group	General / flag officers					Senior officers			Junior officers
Lao	ຈອມພົນ	ພົນເອກ	ພົນໂທ	ພົນຕີ	ພົນຈັດຕະວາ	ພັນເອກ	ພັນໂທ	ພັນຕີ	ຮ້ອຍເອກ	ຮ້ອຍໂທ	ຮ້ອຍຕີ
Romanization	Chǭmphon	Phonʼēk	Phonthō	Phontī	Phonchat tawā	Phanʼēk	Phanthō	Phantī	Hǭiʼēk	Hǭithō	Hǭitī
Litteral translation
Royal Lao Army (1949–1959)
Royal Lao Army (1959–1975)
Royal Lao Navy
Royal Lao Air Force (1959–1964)
Royal Lao Air Force (1964–1975)
Rank group	General / flag officers					Senior officers			Junior officers

=== Student officer ranks ===
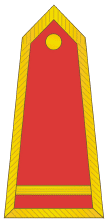
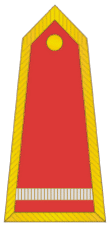
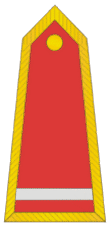
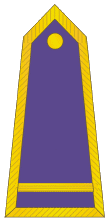
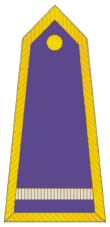
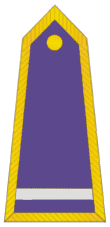
Rank group	Student officer
Lao	ວ່າທີ່ຮ້ອຍຕີ	ນັກຮຽນນາຍຮ້ອຍ	ນັກຮຽນນາຍຮ້ອຍ
Romanization	Wāthī hǭitī	Nak hīan nāihǭi	Nak hīan nāihǭi
Litteral translation
Royal Lao Army
Royal Lao Air Force

== Other ranks ==
The rank insignia of non-commissioned officers and enlisted personnel.

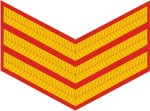
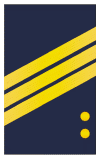
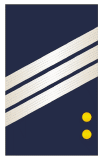
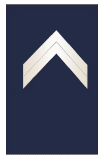
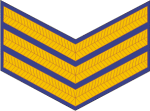
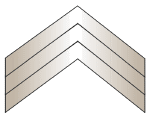
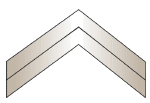
Rank group	Senior NCOs					Junior NCOs		Enlisted
Royal Lao Army									No insignia
Royal Lao Army		Cãã Êek	Cãã Thó	Cãã Trii	Sip Êek	Sip Thó	Sip Trii	Sip	Phonthahan
Royal Lao Navy									No insignia
Royal Lao Navy	Phakhian naïrüa ëk		Phakhian nairüa thõ		Phakhian nairüa trï				Phonthahan
Royal Lao Air Force									No insignia
Royal Lao Air Force		Cãã Êek	Cãã Thó	Cãã Trii	Sip Êek	Sip Thó	Sip Trii		Phonthahan
Rank group	Senior NCOs					Junior NCOs		Enlisted
