= Royal Lao Armed Forces =

Combined military forces of the Kingdom of Laos (1949–1975)

- Forces Armées du Royaume ກອງທັບຣາຊອານາຈັກລາວ
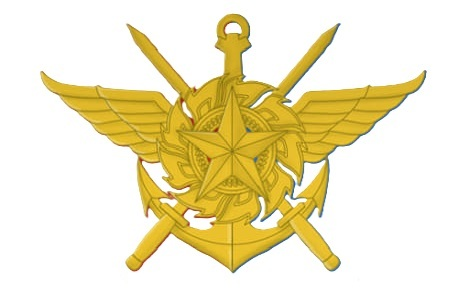
- Royal Lao Armed Forces emblem (1952–1975)

- Flag of the Royal Lao Armed Forces (1952–1975)
- Founded: 1 July 1949
- Disbanded: 2 December 1975
- Service branches: Royal Lao Army; Royal Lao Air Force; Royal Lao Navy
- Headquarters: Phone Kheng (Vientiane)

Leadership
- Commander-in-Chief: Sisavang Vatthana
- Commander: Phasouk Somly Rasaphak

Personnel
- Active personnel: 100,000 men (at height)
- Reserve personnel: 96,000 men

Industry
- Foreign suppliers: France; Australia; Indonesia; Thailand; Cambodia; Japan; Burma; South Korea; South Vietnam; Taiwan; Philippines; Singapore; Malaysia; United Kingdom; United States

Related articles
- History: Military history of Laos
- Ranks: Military ranks of the Royal Lao Armed Forces

The Royal Lao Armed Forces (Lao: ກອງທັບຣາຊອານາຈັກລາວ; French: Forces Armées du Royaume), best known by its French acronym FAR, were the official military of the Kingdom of Laos, a state that existed from 1949 to 1975 in what is now the Lao People's Democratic Republic. First created under the French protectorate of Laos on July 1, 1949, the FAR was responsible for the defense of the Kingdom since its independence in October 1953 from France, until its dissolution on December 2, 1975. It operated notably during the North Vietnamese invasion of Laos and the Laotian Civil War from 1960 to 1975.

== History ==
The foundations of the Royal Lao Armed Forces were laid on May 11, 1947, when King Sisavang Vong granted a constitution declaring Laos an independent nation (and a Kingdom from 1949) within the colonial framework of French Indochina. This act signalled the creation of a Laotian government capable of building its own administration over the next few years, including the establishment of a national defense force. The new Laotian military was officially created on July 1, 1949, from a collection of pre-existing regular colonial Laotian troops, former Lao Issara guerrillas and locally raised irregular auxiliaries. However, the formation process was soon hampered by the developments of the ongoing First Indochina War in neighbouring Vietnam, and it was only in 1952 that the National Laotian Army (Armée Nationale Laotiènne or ANL) – the predecessor of the Royal Lao Army – really began to take shape.

By July 1959, it was known as the Laotian Armed Forces (Forces Armées Laotiènnes – FAL), and in September 1961, was renamed Royal Armed Forces (Forces Armées du Royaume – FAR).

== Command structure ==
Throughout its existence, the Laotian Armed Forces were plagued by an ineffective leadership, particularly at senior levels, which often led to chain-of-command problems. The earlier colonial ANL units in the French Protectorate of Laos consisted mostly of uneducated Laotian peasant recruits led by French officers and senior NCOs; those few Laotians promoted from the ranks rose no further than the command of a company. After the Kingdom of Laos gained its independence in October 1953, the few Laotian officers with military experience were quickly promoted to much higher command positions than they were accustomed to. One key problem was the rigid social stratification between the Officers, Non-commissioned Officers (NCOs), and the rank-and-file. The ANL officer corps was dominated by French-educated Buddhist Lowland Lao aristocratic officers, who were highly prejudiced against the country's ethnic minorities, and cultivated an arrogant and distant relationship with their NCOs and enlisted men, seldom leading them in the field. Leadership responsibility thus fell upon undereducated and poorly-trained sergeants, who actually led the troops in the battlefield during combat operations.

To further aggrieve matters, the Laotian Armed Forces command structure became highly politicized in the early 1960s, where the support of key political figures was of paramount importance in promotion to and retention of command positions; the eight main extended aristocratic families or regional 'clans' who dominated Laotian society felt it advantageous to have family members or friends in key posts of the military establishment. This meant that the Laotian military upper echelons of command were not immune to political interference, in the form of patronage, cronyism and nepotism, since many officers were also commissioned into senior command posts directly from civilian life, owning their positions to family or political connections rather than any military training or ability. These politically appointed officers showed more interest in involving themselves in political manouvres (the 1959, 1960, 1964, 1965, 1966, and 1973 Laotian coups) or engaging in profitable illicit activities (bribery, kickbacks, racketeering, gambling, prostitution, liquor-smuggling, gold-smuggling, and the Opium trade), rather than learning their trade.

Following the 1960 coup d'état, the massive increase in U.S. military aid to Laos provided new incentives for corruption within the military, with RLA officers on very modest salaries began constructing huge mansions with profits derived from the misuse of American aid, which included the embezzlement and diversion of funds, the theft and sale on the Black market of supplies and equipment, and the listing of non-existent troops on payrolls so that corrupt officers could pocket their wages. As a result, the FAR officer corps was riven by corruption and inefficiency, exacerbated by political divisions and even personal rivalries at all echelons of command. Both professional and personal jealousy was not unknown amongst Laotian senior Commanders, which resulted in constant skirmishing between professionally-trained career soldiers and inept political appointees, sometimes with fatal consequences. In a work environment marred by mutual suspicion and intense competition, most Laotian Colonels and Generals made little effort to coordinate their activities, which rendered the Command, control and coordination of military operations problematic, and hampered the military performance of the FAR branches.

This situation was further complicated by a decentralised command structure, in which the FAR General Staff (État-Major Générale – EMG) in Vientiane served primarily an administrative function, exerting little control over the regional commands and local commanders were free to adjust their tactics to the local situation. Laos had a long-standing "warlord" tradition of local power-brokers, and consequently, real power was in the hands of the regional commanders (usually Colonels or Brigadier generals) who manned the military districts (or "Military Regions" – MR) in the provinces, which operated like autonomous fiefdoms. With the formation of the Mobile Groups (French: Groupements mobiles – GMs) at each Laotian Military Region in the early 1960s, the MR Commanders' influence was challenged by the growing power of the GM Commanders (Majors or Lieutenant colonels), who acted as junior "warlords". In practice, the Military Region's commanders used the GMs as their private armies to further their own interests, rarely dispatching them outside the Mekong River valley. A high-echelon command position within a Military Region was dependent upon the influence of a local aristocratic family who economically and politically dominated the MR. If a colonel or general was not a scion of one of these families, then he had to get their support in some other manner.

=== Regional commands ===
Laos was divided since 1955 into five Military Regions (Régions Militaires) roughly corresponding to the areas of the country's 13 provinces. The Military Regions were the basis of the warlordism culture that affected the ANL and the FAR High Command, with most of the MR Commanders running their zones like private fiefdoms.

== Branches ==
By September 1961 the Royal Lao Armed Forces consisted of three conventional ground, air and naval branches of service. Their primarily roles were: guarantee the sovereignty of the King, ensure internal stability and security by maintaining the social and political order, and defend the Kingdom of Laos against external aggression. Subordinated to the Ministry of Defense of the Royal Lao Government at the national capital Vientiane, the FAR branches were organized as follows:

- Royal Lao Army (Armée Royale du Laos – ARL)
- Royal Lao Air Force (Aviation Royale Laotiènne – AVRL)
- Royal Lao Navy (Marine Royale Laotiènne – MRL)

=== Elite formations ===
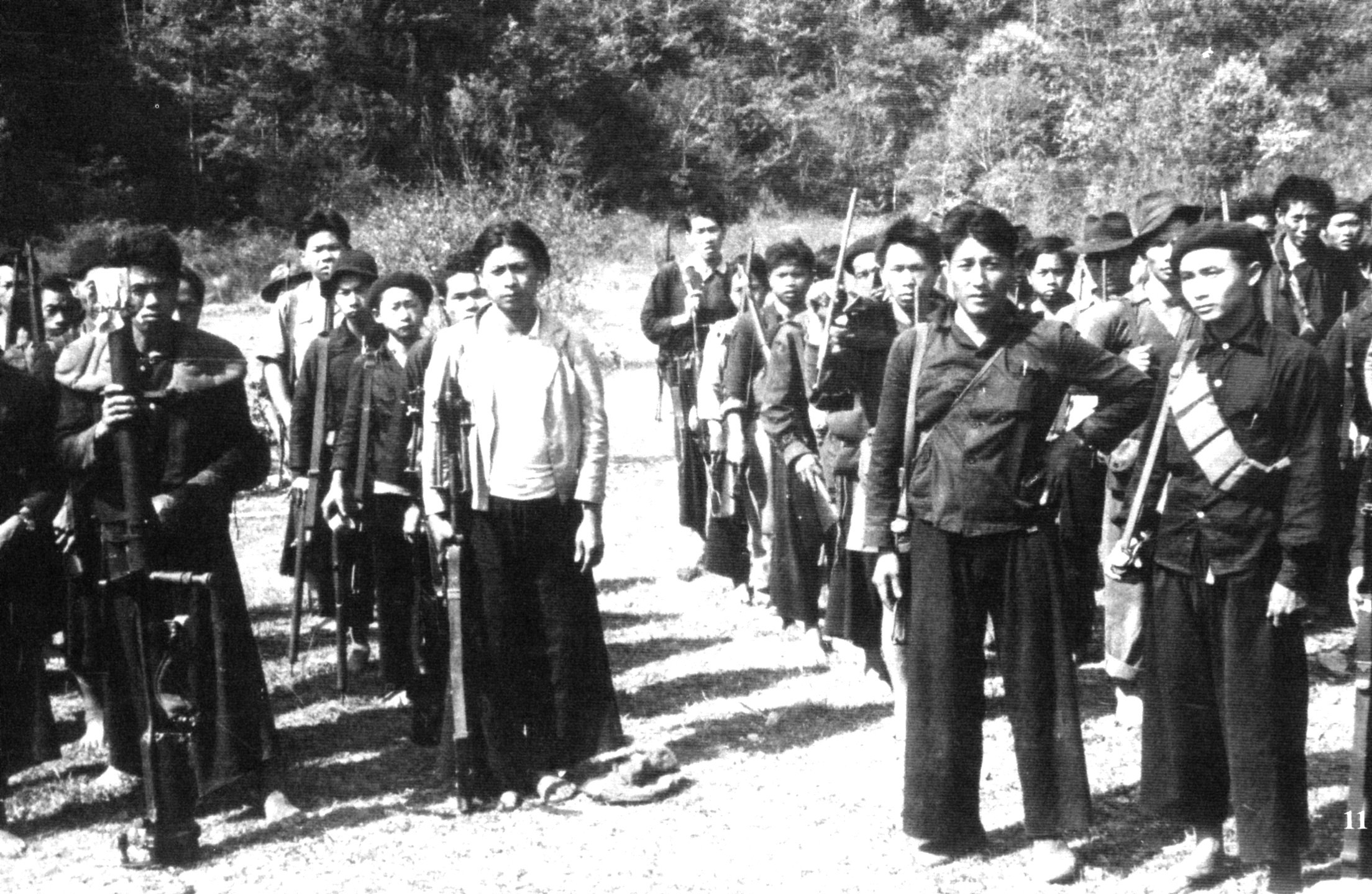
An Auto Defense de Choc (ADC) Hmong guerrilla company assembles at Phou Vieng, Spring 1961.

- Royal Lao Army Airborne
- Military Region 5 Commandos
- Commando Raider Teams
- SPECOM
- Special Guerrilla Units (SGU)
- Directorate of National Coordination

== Training institutions ==
Prior to its independence in October 1953, Laos lacked almost completely a professional military school system – Officer, Non-commissioned officer (NCO) and Staff schools, plus Technical and Branch training schools – for its Armed Forces, and relied heavily on foreign assistance to train its personnel. Beginning in the early 1950s, Laotian Officers and selected enlisted men were sent overseas to attend specialized courses and advanced schools, and this practice would continue throughout the 1960s and early 1970s. However, a small indigenous training infrastructure (initially run exclusively by the French) gradually began to take shape during the last years of the First Indochina War, and as the Laotian Civil War progressed, it was expanded with the help of the American aid programs, with most of the training being carried out by U.S. advisors.

=== Lao Military Academy and Staff College ===
The first Laotian military schools were established by the Command of the French Forces in the Far East (Commandement des Troupes Françaises en Extrême Orient – TFEO) in 1952, with the creation at Pakse and Vientiane of two non-commissioned officer (NCO) training schools (École des Cadres), later merged into a single institution, the Reserve Cadres Training Centre or RCTC (Centre de Formation des Cadres de Réserve – CFCR), soon followed by a Reserve Officers Training School or ROTS (École des Officiers de Reserve – EOR). First set up at Pakse, the latter institution was later transferred to Dong Hene in Savannakhet province, which eventually became the Lao Military Academy or LMA. The officers' courses ministered at the Dong Hene Academy lasted a year and provided technical instruction to mobilized Lao civil servants and selected personnel drawn from the ranks of the ANL or from the Land Forces of Laos (Forces Terrestres du Laos – FTL), and by July 1954, 80 active-duty lieutenants and 115 second lieutenants had been graduated.

Transferred to Pakse after the merger with his parent instituition from Vientiane, the RCTC non-commissioned officer school was able to graduate 525 sergeants by 1953; an additional Training Centre for non-commissioned officers was opened at the French-run Camp Chinaimo, a major military facility located on the southern outskirts of Vientiane.

A Staff and Command school, the Military Institution of Higher Learning or MIHL (Institut des hautes études militaires – IHEM), which was later transferred to Long Tieng in Xaisomboun province, and an Accountancy School (École de Comptabilité) were also established at the time in Vientiane.

In early 1962, a new Reserve Officer Candidate School or ROCS (École des Candidats Officiers de Réserve – ECOR) was re-established at Dong Hene, being staffed by two teams of U.S. Special Forces (USSF) White Star Mobile Training Team advisors totalling 14 men, assisted by Laotian RLA instructors. The reserve officer's course own curriculum placed emphasis on irregular warfare and counterinsurgency: while the Americans conducted the weapons handling and tactical training, the Laotian instructors taught courses in military discipline, military regulations, and civic action. Prior to graduation, the American advisors led the Laotian students on a field exercise, often complemented by a live-fire field operation against NVA/Pathet Lao forces in the surrounding areas of the training centre, which completed the officer's course. During a six-month period, the Dong Hene ROCS graduated two groups of 120 junior officers each.

In mid-1965, ten Royal Thai Army (RTA) instructors – among them, Chaovalit Yongchaiyudh, future prime minister of Thailand – arrived at the IHEM in Long Tieng to run the first 32-week command and staff course that resulted in the graduation of 30 Laotian senior officers in early 1966. A separate Staff School (École d'État-Major – EAM) was also established at Phone Kheng near Vientiane, which graduated nine intakes before closing in 1972 due to budgetary reasons.

=== Laotian Armed Forces training Centres ===
Six Laotian Armed Forces training Centres or LAFTC (Centres de Formation des Forces Armées Laotiénnes – CFFAR) were established jointly by the French and U.S. Operation Hotfoot mobile training team advisors at Khang Khay in Military Region 2 (MR 2), at Kilometer 17 (KM 17) and Kilometer 22 (KM 22) both located northeast of Vientiane on Route 13, and at Luang Prabang, Savannakhet and Pakse between July 1959 and March 1960, in order to provide basic infantry and Ranger training to both regular RLA and irregular SGU Laotian troops.

=== Combat Arms Training Centre ===
In a concerted effort to enhance training of Laotian regular and irregular troops in-country, a Commando Training Centre was established in September 1968 at Dong Hene, in which company-size units from across Laos would rotate through the base during training stints, but the concept failed to catch imaginations and did not proceeded as expected. It was not until two years later that the concept of a national training centre was resurrected, in the form of the Combat Arms Training Centre or CATC (Centre d'Entraînement aux Armes de Combat – CEAC), officially established on September 1, 1970, at Phou Khao Khouay, a military base located 22 kilometers (13.67 miles) north of Vientiane and formerly used by the Directorate of National Coordination (DNC) in the early 1960s. Being larger than the Dong Hene centre, the facility also housed the RLA's Branch training schools, comprising the Infantry School (École d'Infanterie), the Commando School (École de Commandos), and the Artillery School (École d'Artillerie), and the new CATC was set to assume nationwide battalion-level training within two years, being initially envisioned as capable of handling simultaneously one commando company and two infantry battalions.

=== Airborne training centres ===
To train Laotian paratrooper battalions, airborne training centres were established by the French at Wattay Air Base just outside Vientiane in September 1948, followed later in February 1960 by Vang Vieng, located 17 kilometers (15.60 miles) from Vientiane, set up with the help of U.S. Military Assistance Advisory Group (Laos) advisors, and at Seno, a French military base located about 30 kilometers (20 miles) east of Savannakhet by French Military Mission in Laos advisors. A fourth Parachute School was briefly established by the Neutralists in 1961 at Muang Phanh in Xiangkhouang Province, but the Pathet Lao offensive held in early May 1964 forced the training staff to relocate to Vang Vieng.

=== Commando and infantry training centres ===
In the midst of the 1971 reorganization, two dual commando/infantry training centres were set up by the Americans at the Phou Khao Khouay base, north of Vientiane and Seno near Savannakhet for the Royal Lao Army (RLA) new strike divisions; the teaching staff consisted of several Laotian graduates of the U.S. Special Forces (USSF) course at Fort Bragg, North Carolina, in the United States. A third one, the CIA-run PS 18 secret camp near Pakse in Champassak Province was used for two RLA brigades being raised in Military Region 4 (MR 4).

=== Armour training centres ===
The French military mission established early in 1952 at Pakse a Technical Training Centre (Centre de Formation Technique – CFT) to provide instruction to ANL armoured car crews, as the development of armoured reconnaissance squadrons was being considered. In December 1961, the Neutralists set up an Armoured Training Centre at Ban Phong Savang in Savannakhet Province, with the help of NVA instructors to train Neutralist personnel in PT-76 amphibious light tank tactics and maintenance, though it was later shut down by the Pathet Lao offensive of May 1964.

=== Aviation school ===
A flying school was first established by the French at Wattay Air Base in January 1955 to train Laotian pilot cadets, later transferred to Seno Air Base and placed under the control of the RLAF's Air Training Command – ATC (Commandement de l'Entraînement Aérienne – CEA), being re-designated the RLAF Pilot Training School (École d'Entraînement de Pilotes – EEP). The school's own curriculum included flight instruction, navigation training, combat tactics, aircraft systems training and other technical instruction to Laotian pilots for various aircraft types used by the Royal Lao Air Force, including helicopters and fixed-wing aircraft. The training programs aimed to develop the skills and proficiency of Laotian pilots in operating and flying their assigned aircraft effectively and were often assisted by U.S. military advisors and instructors, who provided expertise in flight operations, maintenance, and other areas.

=== Naval Jungle School ===
In 1970, a U.S.-funded Royal Lao Navy Jungle School (MRL École de la Jungle) was established at Thakhek in Khammouane Province, which offered courses for MRL students in basic infantry amphibious tactics and river patrolling techniques. Graduation exercises had the Laotian naval cadets assault beaches from landing craft, though these tactics were never used in actual operations.

== Foreign assistance ==
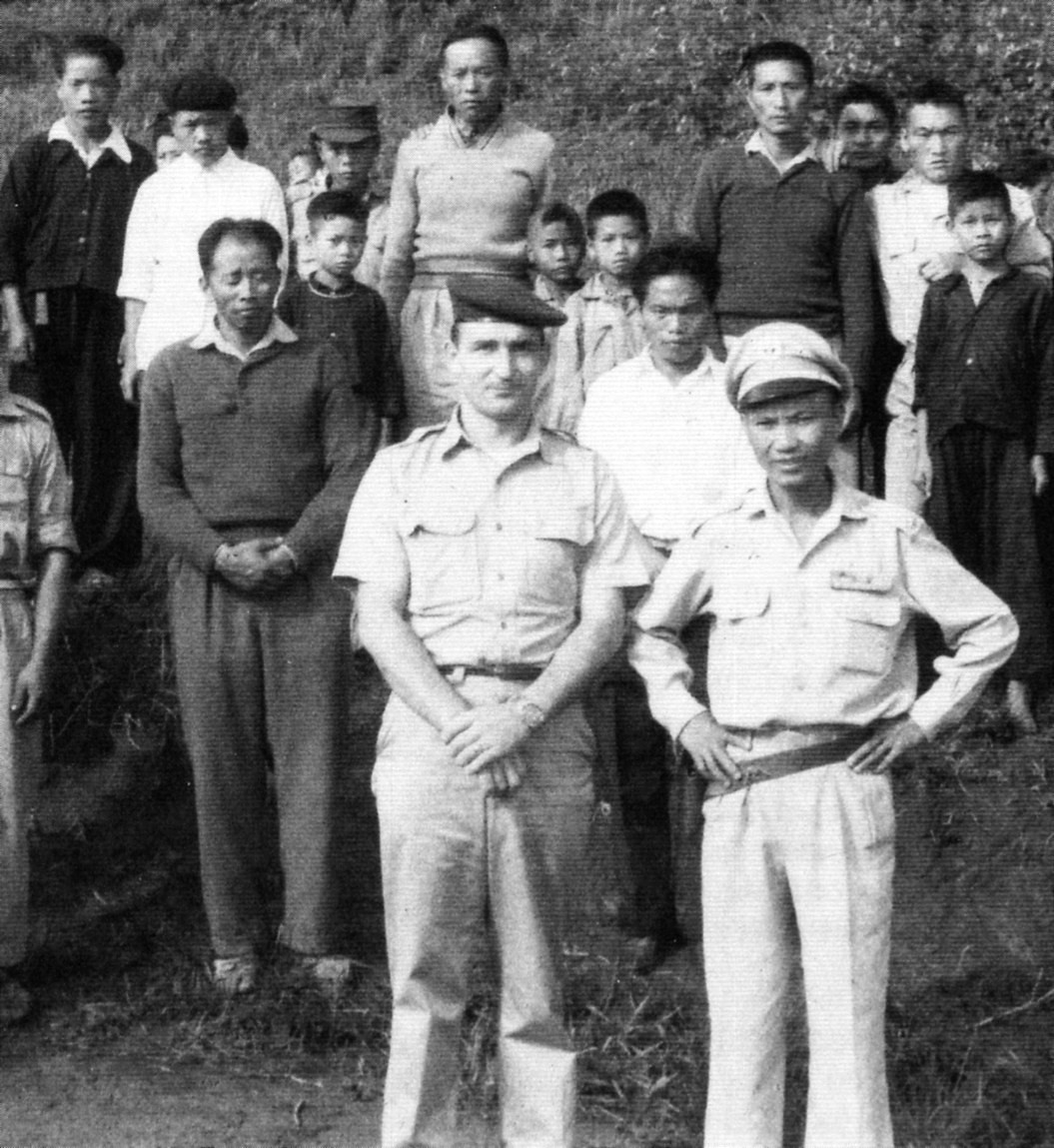
PEO adviser Jack F. Mathews with then Major Vang Pao, commander of the 10éme Bataillon de Infanterie (10 BI), at Nong Net, July 1960.

Throughout its existence, the Laotian Armed Forces received military assistance at different periods and lengths of time from several countries, including France, the United Kingdom, the United States, Thailand, Burma, the Philippines, the Republic of China (Taiwan), Cambodia, South Vietnam, Indonesia, Australia, and (briefly) from North Vietnam and the Soviet Union.

To meet the threat represented by the Pathet Lao insurgency, the Laotian Armed Forces depended on a small French military training mission (Mission Militaire Française près du Gouvernment Royale du Laos or MMF-GRL), headed by a general officer, an exceptional arrangement permitted under the 1955 Geneva Accords, as well as covert assistance from the United States in the form of the Programs Evaluation Office (PEO), established on 15 December 1955, replaced in 1961 by the Military Assistance Advisory Group (Laos), which was later changed in September 1962 into the Requirements Office. Between 1962 and 1971, the U.S. provided Laos with direct military assistance, but not including the cost of equipping and training irregular and paramilitary forces by the Central Intelligence Agency (CIA).

At the time of the ANL's establishment, Laos had no in-country military schools. As an interim measure, in 1949 an initial group of four Laotian officer student candidates (Aspirants) went to the French-run Khmer Military Academy (École Militaire Khmère) in Phnom Penh, Cambodia to attend the three-year officer course. A number of Laotian candidate officers and senior officers were also sent to France, and later the United States, to receive basic officer and advanced staff training in their respective Military Academies and Staff Colleges. In October 1958, 39 training slots for Laotian officers and non-commissioned officers (NCOs) were reserved for courses to be held the following year at Fort Benning, Georgia. In 1953, at least 17 Laotian Aspirants were sent to the prestigious Saint Cyr Military Academy (École spéciale militaire de Saint-Cyr) in France, whilst senior officers attended staff courses at both the French Army Staff School (École d'État-Major) and the School of Advanced Military Studies (Centre des hautes études militaires – CHEM) in Paris; other Laotian officers received their staff training at the United States Army Command and General Staff College in Fort Leavenworth, Kansas.

Paratrooper and Commando units were sent overseas to receive advanced airborne and reconnaissance training, with Laotian pupils attending the Scout Ranger course at Fort William McKinley in Manila, the Philippines, manned by Philippine Army instructors; others attended Para-commando courses manned by Indonesian Army instructors at their airborne training centre located at Batujajar, near Bandung, Indonesia. As early as September 1959, the Royal Thai Army (RTA) began providing instruction to 1,400 Laotian recruits in guerrilla and counter-insurgency warfare at Camp Erawan in Lopburi Province, Thailand under a secret military training program codenamed Project Erawan, followed in April 1961 by the establishment of a second training camp for Laotian students in northeast Thailand under Project Ekarad, which had morphed itself from the earlier Project Erawan. Further airborne and Ranger training was provided by the Royal Thai Special Forces (RTSF) at their Special Warfare Centre and Recondo School co-located at Fort Narai in Lopburi Province, Thailand, while Guerrilla and Commando techniques were taught by the Royal Thai Police (RTP) Police Aerial Reinforcement Unit (PARU) at their Phitsanulok and Hua Hin training camps. In late 1969, 76 RLA students were dispatched to the RTA Artillery Center at Kokethiem in Thailand for training in V-100 armoured car tactics and maintenance under the auspices of a U.S. Army mobile training team, whilst 25 Laotian officers and NCOs were sent to the U.S. Army Armor School at Fort Knox, Kentucky to attend the Armor Basic Officer Leaders Course and the Cavalry Leader Course. That same year, a number of Laotian students attended both the Parachute course at the U.S. Army Airborne School at Fort Benning, Georgia, and the U.S. Special Forces (USSF) course at Fort Bragg, North Carolina. In 1971, three RLA officers were sent to Australia to attend Jungle warfare, weapons, and Commando courses manned by Australian Army instructors from the 1st Commando Regiment.

In late 1955, 22 Royal Laotian Air Force cadets attended flight courses at the École de l'air in France and Morocco, though five RLAF pilot students were sent in 1962 to the United States to receive training on the T-28 at Moody Air Force Base, Georgia; under an accelerated training program codenamed Operation Waterpump, set up in March 1964, other RLAF pilots were sent to Udorn Royal Thai Air Force Base in Thailand to attended T-28 courses manned by U.S. advisors. Laotian pilots and air crews were later sent for 0–1, UH-1, T-28, EC-47, AC-47, and C-123 training to South Vietnam and Thailand. Most of the advanced courses and specialized training of Laotian combat pilots was conducted by American advisors of Detachment 1, 56th Special Operations Wing at Udorn, U-Tapao, and Takhli airbases in Thailand, while others were dispatched to attend observer courses at Bien Hoa Air Base, South Vietnam. Additional training was provided in Laos by U.S. Air America instructors to RLAF's C-123 pilots and maintenance crews between January 1973 and July 1974.

Beginning in 1952, a number of Laotian naval officer candidate students (Eléves Officiers de Marine – EOMs) were sent to France, in order to attend advanced Officer and Petty Officer courses at the French Naval Academy in Brest; every year, two or three Officers and three Petty Officers went to France for specialist courses, and also received on-the-job training with the Rhine Flotilla (Flotilla du Rhin). That same year, 18 Laotian naval junior ranks were sent for four months of riverine training in Saigon, South Vietnam, manned by French Officers and senior Petty Officers seconded from the naval forces component of the French Far East Expeditionary Corps (CEFEO). Other Laotian naval personnel went to South Vietnam, where they attended training courses offered by the Republic of Vietnam Navy at their Training Centers located in Saigon, Nha Trang, and Cam Ranh Bay; further on-the-job training was provided to Laotian recruits by the Royal Thai Navy in Thailand. Additional technical assistance was provided by the Americans through the Programs Evaluation Office (PEO) since 1959, in the form of marine mechanics courses conducted by a PEO instructor team led by a U.S. Navy Reserve Officer at the flotilla's repair shop in Chinaimo Naval Base, whilst two contracted Filipino technicians from the Eastern Construction Company (abbreviated as ECCOIL) were assigned to the ANL River Flotilla headquarters to train Laotian sailors.

== See also ==
- Air America
- Battle of Lang Vei
- Cambodian Civil War
- Forces Armées Neutralistes
- Khmer National Armed Forces
- Laotian Civil War
- Lao People's Armed Forces
- List of weapons of the Laotian Civil War
- Project 404
- Project Unity (Laos)
- Pathet Lao
- Republic of Vietnam Military Forces
- Royal Lao Police
- Royal Thai Armed Forces
- Vietnam War
- 1967 Opium War
- Trương Tử Anh
