= Bình Cơ =

Bình Cơ Phường Bình Cơ Bình Mỹ
- Ward
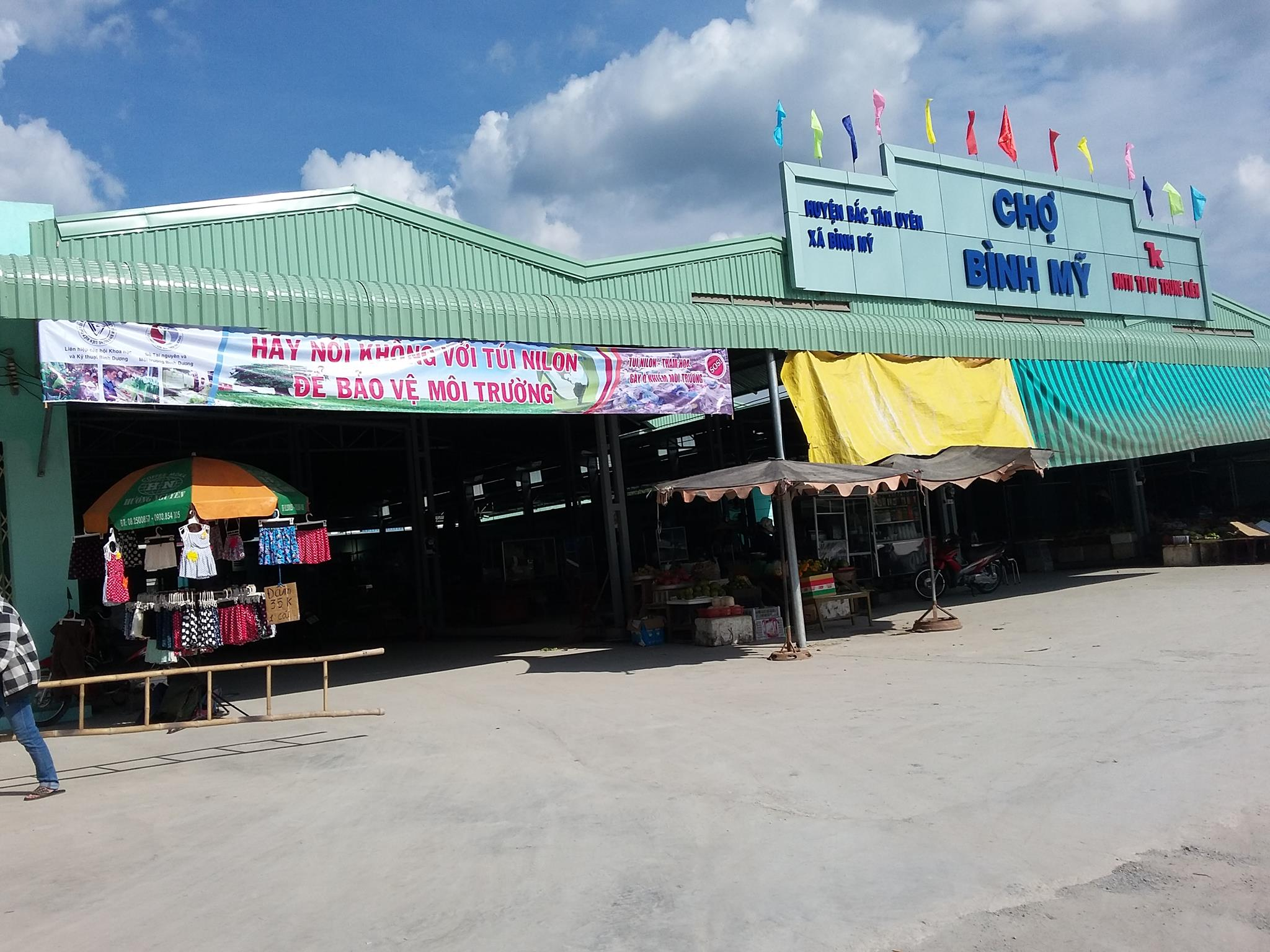
- Bình Mỹ Market
- Interactive map of Bình Cơ
- Coordinates: 11°06′36″N 106°45′44″E
- Country: Vietnam
- Municipality: Ho Chi Minh City
- Established: June 16, 2025

Area
  - Total: 28.45 sq mi (73.69 km^{2})

Population (2024)
  - Total: 64,601
  - Density: 2,271/sq mi (876.7/km^{2})
- Time zone: UTC+07:00 (Indochina Time)
- Administrative code: 25915

Bình Cơ (Vietnamese: Phường Bình Cơ) is a ward of Ho Chi Minh City, Vietnam. It is one of the 168 new wards, communes and special zones of the city following the reorganization in 2025.

== History ==
On June 16, 2025, the National Assembly Standing Committee issued Resolution No. 1685/NQ-UBTVQH15 on the arrangement of commune-level administrative units of Ho Chi Minh City in 2025 (effective from June 16, 2025). Accordingly, the entire land area and population of Hội Nghĩa ward of the former Tân Uyên city and Bình Mỹ commune of the former Bắc Tân Uyên district will be integrated into a new ward named Bình Cơ (Clause 98, Article 1).
