= Tan Loi (disambiguation) =

Tân Lợi may refer to several places in Vietnam, including:

- Tân Lợi, a commune of Đồng Nai
- Tân Lợi, An Giang, a former commune of Tịnh Biên District in An Giang province
- Tân Lợi, a former commune of Đồng Hỷ District in Thái Nguyên province
