= Phước Hòa =

Phước Hòa Xã Phước Hòa
- Commune
- Interactive map of Phước Hòa
- Coordinates: 11°15′02″N 106°45′34″E
- Country: Vietnam
- Municipality: Ho Chi Minh City
- Established: June 16, 2025

Area
  - Total: 49.45 sq mi (128.07 km^{2})

Population (2024)
  - Total: 42,470
  - Density: 858.9/sq mi (331.6/km^{2})
- Time zone: UTC+07:00 (Indochina Time)
- Administrative code: 25882

Phước Hòa (Vietnamese: Xã Phước Hòa) is a commune of Ho Chi Minh City, Vietnam. It is one of the 168 new wards, communes and special zones of the city following the reorganization in 2025.

== History ==
On June 16, 2025, the National Assembly Standing Committee issued Resolution No. 1685/NQ-UBTVQH15 on the arrangement of commune-level administrative units of Ho Chi Minh City in 2025 (effective from June 16, 2025). Accordingly, the entire land area and population of Phước Hòa, Vĩnh Hòa communes and part of Tam Lập commune of the former Phú Giáo district will be integrated into a new commune named Phước Hòa (Clause 139, Article 1).
