= Phước Thành province =

Historic province of Vietnam

Phước Thành is a former province of Southeast region in South Vietnam. It was formed in 1959 from Tân Uyên, Biên Hòa and part of Phước Long province, Long Khánh, Bình Dương province. Province capital was Phước Vĩnh. In 1965 Phú Giáo District of the Phước Thành was dissolved into Bình Dương Province. On July 6, 1965, rest of the province was dissolved.

== Districts ==
- Tân Uyên
- Hiếu Liêm
- Phú Giáo

== Geography ==
Phuoc Thanh Province is geographically located:

- To the east was Long Khanh;
- To the west was Binh Duong and Binh Long provinces;
- To the south was Bien Hoa province;
- To the north was Phuoc Long province.

Phuoc Thanh Province had an area of 1,300 km².

=== Natural geography ===
Phuoc Thanh's land was mostly plains, forests and fruit gardens, with no high mountains. The main river of the province was the Be River (a tributary of the Dong Nai River), from Binh Long and Phuoc Long flowing in the North-South direction, to An Linh flowing in the Northeast-Southwest direction and having a tributary, the Giai River. Next was the Dong Nai River, flowing close to the border with Long Khanh and Bien Hoa in the South. In addition, the province also had other significant rivers and streams such as Da Sa Mach, Rach Rat, Lach Be stream, Ma Da stream, Ram stream, Trong stream, Tien stream, etc.

The climate of the province was hot and humid and was divided into two seasons: the dry season from October to April, the rainy season from May to October. Two inter-provincial roads No. 1 and 16 connected Phuoc Thanh with neighboring provinces.

== Administration ==
Phuoc Thanh province had 3 districts: Phu Giao, Tan Uyen, Hieu Liem.

== History ==
On January 23, 1959, the President of the Republic of Vietnam issued Decree No. 25-NV on the establishment of Phuoc Thanh province on the basis of Tan Uyen district, Bien Hoa province; a part of Binh Duong province; a part of the southern Bunard of Phuoc Long province and the Ta Lai area of Long Khanh province.

Phuoc Thanh provincial capital was Phuoc Vinh. Phuoc Thanh had two airports in Phuoc Vinh provincial capital and near the Da Sa Mach river. Phuoc Thanh province had 3 districts:

- Phu Giao district: district capital was located in Bo La, formerly Nuoc Vang.
- Tan Uyen district: district capital was located in Uyen Hung.
- Hieu Liem district: district capital was located in Lac An, formerly Song Be estuary, Chanh Hung commune.

On 18 September 1961, the province was liberated by the North Vietnam after its provincial city was attacked.

On July 6, 1965, the Prime Minister of the Republic of Vietnam issued Decree No. 131-NV on the dissolution of Phuoc Thanh province. Currently, the place name "Phuoc Thanh" is only used in Phuoc Thanh commune, a commune under Ho Chi Minh City.

== Economy and society ==
In addition to the majority of Kinh people living here, there were also ethnic minorities of the Stieng, Maa Churu and Khmer and Cham origin. The main religions were Buddhism, Catholicism, Protestantism, worshiping Gods and Ancestors.

Rice was the main crop, followed by secondary crops such as cassava, potatoes and beans. The industrial crops grown quite a lot were rubber and coffee.

Orchards grew many types of fruit trees such as custard apple, orange, tangerine, durian, guava.... People also grew sugarcane in places near rivers.

Forests provided a number of trees such as bamboo, reed, oil wood, firewood, rattan....

== Culture ==
Phuoc Thanh did not have many relics and scenic spots. In addition to rivers and fruit gardens, one could visit Suoi Tien and Tri An waterfall in the south of the province, close to the border with Bien Hoa province.
