= Lao People's Navy =

Maritime warfare branch of Laos' military

- ກອງທັບເຮືອປະຊາຊົນລາວ
- Flag of the Lao People's Navy
- Founded: 1975; 51 years ago
- Country: Laos
- Type: Riverine naval force
- Role: Naval warfare River warfare
- Part of: Lao People's Army
- Headquarters: Vientiane

The Lao People's Navy (LPN; Lao: ກອງທັບເຮືອປະຊາຊົນລາວ, romanized: Kǭngthap Hư̄a Pasāson Lāo) or Riverine Force is the riverine naval force of Lao People's Army of Laos. In 1975 the Lao People's Navy (LPN) was established with the remnants of the Royal Lao Navy. As Laos is a landlocked country, the Lao People's Navy operates vessels on the Mekong River, a major feature of the country's geography. This makes Lao People's Navy one of the most prominent examples of a navy that is exclusively brown-water. Because the Mekong makes up a considerable portion of the Lao border, the Navy is significantly involved in border control work. The navy as of the mid-1990s had a personnel strength of around 500 and around fifty river patrol boats.

Almost all officers of the Lao People's Navy were trained in the Vietnam Naval Academy.

== Fleet ==
Vessel type	Origin	Quantity
Inshore Patrol Craft	Vietnam	12
Landing Craft, Mechanized	Vietnam	4
Patrol Boats	China	20–30
Patrol Boats	Soviet Union	?

== See also ==
- Lao People's Army
- Lao People's Liberation Army Air Force
