= Phước Thành, Ho Chi Minh City =

Phước Thành Xã Phước Thành Phước Sang
- Commune
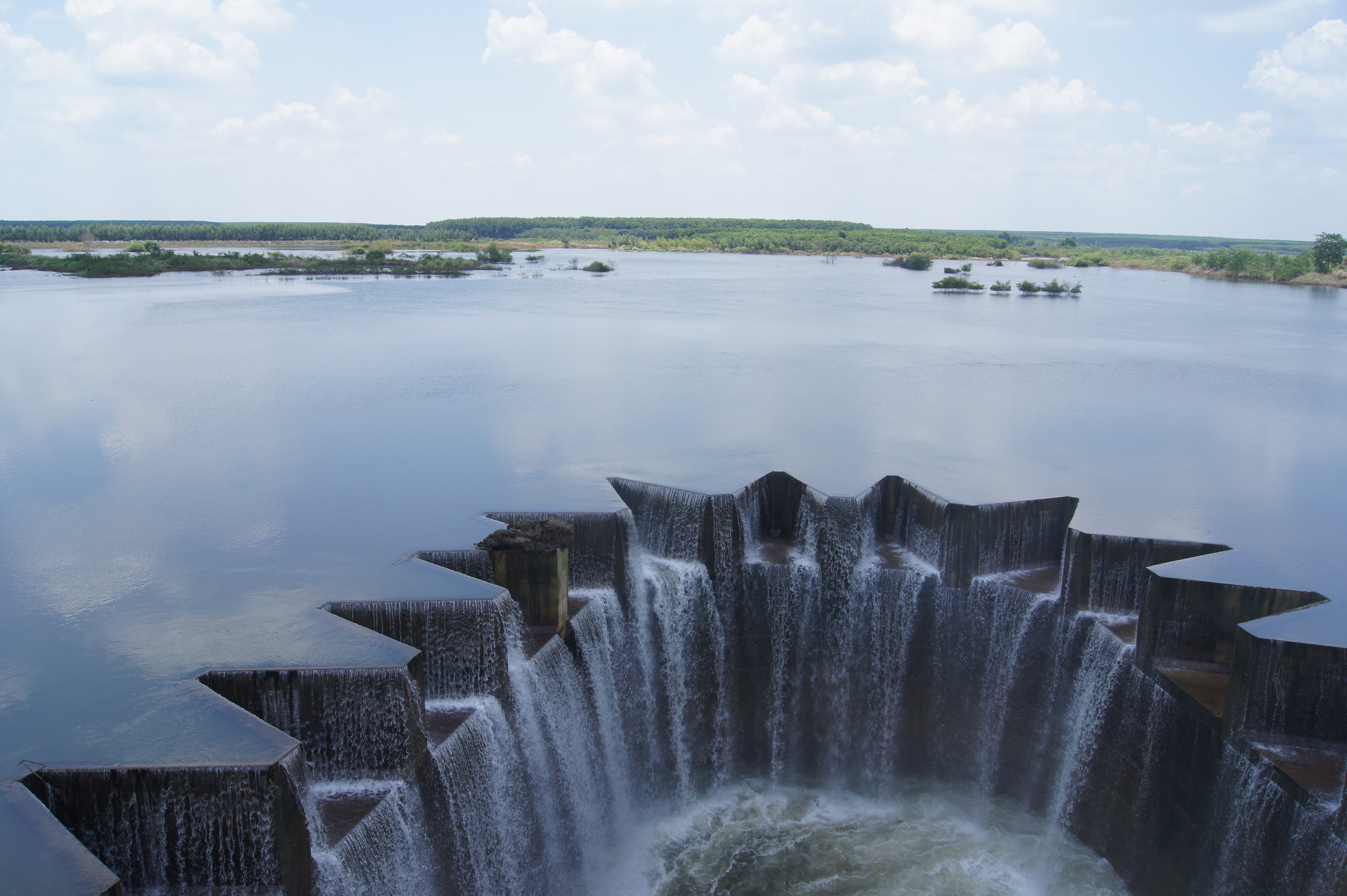
- Phước Hòa – Dầu Tiếng Water Transfer Channel Spillway
- Interactive map of Phước Thành
- Coordinates: 11°22′25″N 106°46′07″E
- Country: Vietnam
- Municipality: Ho Chi Minh City
- Established: June 16, 2025

Area
  - Total: 47.68 sq mi (123.49 km^{2})

Population (2024)
  - Total: 15,803
  - Density: 331.44/sq mi (127.97/km^{2})
- Time zone: UTC+07:00 (Indochina Time)
- Administrative code: 25864

Phước Thành (Vietnamese: Xã Phước Thành) is a commune of Ho Chi Minh City, Vietnam. It is one of the 168 new wards, communes and special zones of the city following the reorganization in 2025.

The commune is named after the former Phước Thành province.

== History ==
On June 16, 2025, the National Assembly Standing Committee issued Resolution No. 1685/NQ-UBTVQH15 on the arrangement of commune-level administrative units of Ho Chi Minh City in 2025 (effective from June 16, 2025). Accordingly, the entire land area and population of Tân Hiệp, Phước Sang and An Thái communes of the former Phú Giáo district will be integrated into a new commune named Phước Thành (Clause 140, Article 1).
