= Bắc Tân Uyên =

Bắc Tân Uyên Xã Bắc Tân Uyên Tân Thành, Tân Định, Đất Cuốc
- Commune
- Interactive map of Bắc Tân Uyên
- Coordinates: 11°09′00″N 106°50′38″E
- Country: Vietnam
- Municipality: Ho Chi Minh City
- Established: June 16, 2025

Area
  - Total: 55.48 sq mi (143.69 km^{2})

Population (2024)
  - Total: 27,964
  - Density: 504.05/sq mi (194.61/km^{2})
- Time zone: UTC+07:00 (Indochina Time)
- Administrative code: 25906

Bắc Tân Uyên (Vietnamese: Xã Bắc Tân Uyên) is a commune of Ho Chi Minh City, Vietnam. It is one of the 168 new wards, communes and special zones of the city following the reorganization in 2025.

== History ==
On June 16, 2025, the National Assembly Standing Committee issued Resolution No. 1685/NQ-UBTVQH15 on the arrangement of commune-level administrative units of Ho Chi Minh City in 2025 (effective from June 16, 2025). Accordingly, the entire land area and population of Tân Thành township and Đất Cuốc, Tân Định communes of the former Bắc Tân Uyên district will be integrated into a new commune named Bắc Tân Uyên (Clause 137, Article 1).
