= Foul (nautical) =

Nautical term meaning to entangle or entwine

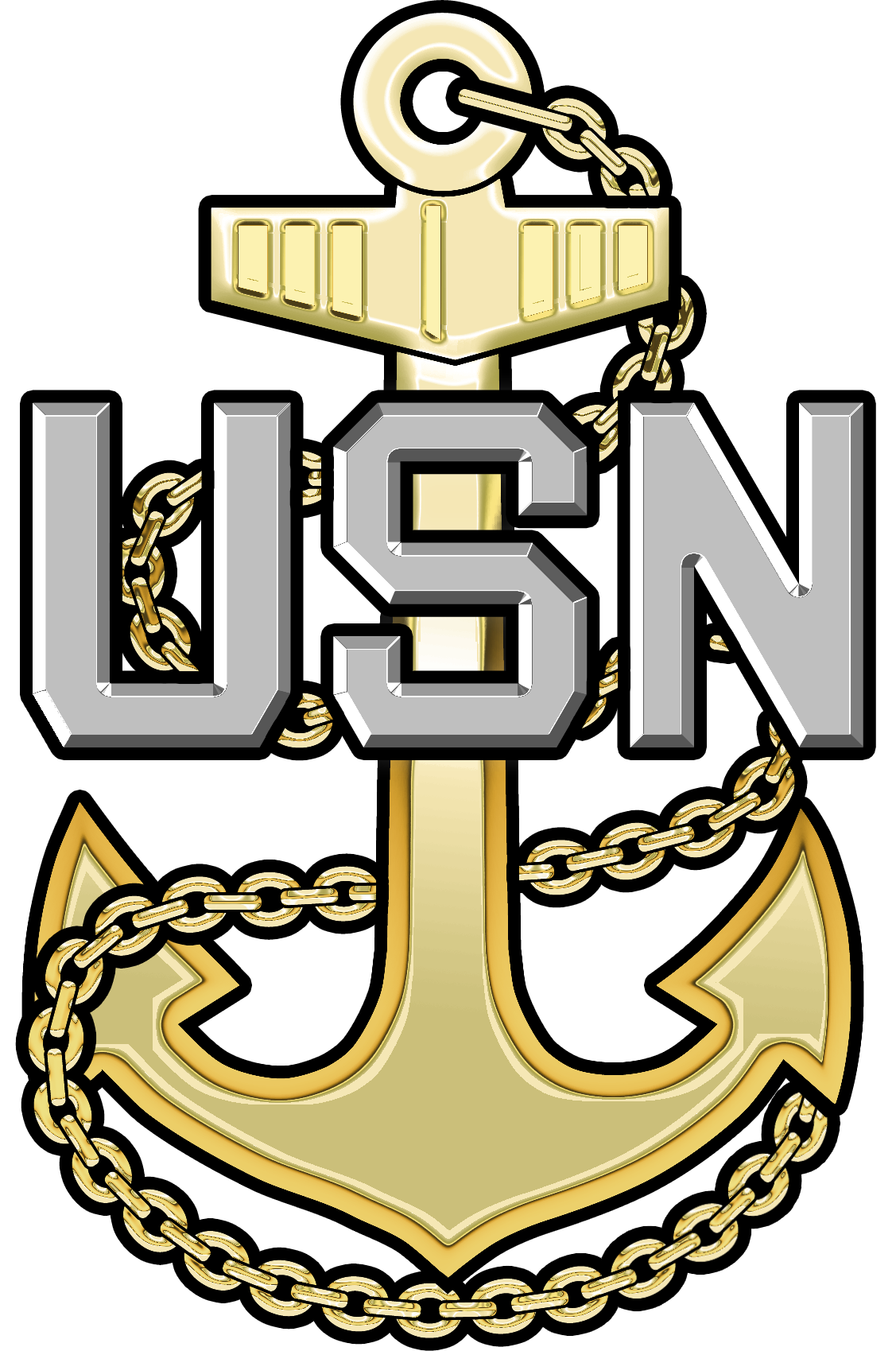
Example of a foul anchor used as a symbol (as rank insignia of a United States Navy chief petty officer)

Foul is a nautical term meaning to entangle or entwine, and more generally that something is wrong or difficult. The term dates back to usage with wind-driven sailing ships.

== Foul anchor ==
The term is usually applied to the state of an anchor which has become hooked on some impediment on the seafloor, or has its cable wound round the stock or flukes. The term is generally utilized when speaking of items of historical value such as the emblem of the United States Marine Corps or the United States Navy chief petty officer emblem. The foul anchor is also the official seal of the Lord High Admiral of the United Kingdom; the seal is flown on the ship carrying the monarch to sea and during the launching of a warship of the Royal Navy.

A foul anchor is depicted on the emblem of the U.S. Public Health Service. Ships would display a foul anchor to indicate to officers on shore that sick persons were on board, prompting further investigation and possible quarantine.

Flag of the Lord High Admiral, depicting a foul anchor

== Other usage ==
The term can be applied to many nautical situations:

- Foul hawse: when a ship lying to two anchors gets the cables crossed.
- Foul bottom: in reference to a seafloor that has poor qualities for securing an anchor, such as hard rocks, coral, wreckage, or other impediments that would make securing or unsecuring an anchor difficult or impossible. Also, in reference to the hull of ship that is so encrusted with weeds and marine growth as to impede her progress.
- Foul wind: when a strong head wind prevents a sailing ship from keeping her desired course.
- Foul deck: on an aircraft carrier, when the deck is occupied by aircraft, thus preventing other aircraft from landing.
- Foul propeller (or foul prop): a propeller which has become tangled with a rope/cable/line, or (generally on smaller propellers) weeds.
- Foul weather: any weather condition deemed hostile to sailors' vessel or comfort; encompasses heavy winds, rains, etc.

== See also ==
- Marine fouling
