= Thường Tân =

Thường Tân Xã Thường Tân Hiếu Liêm, Lạc An
- Commune
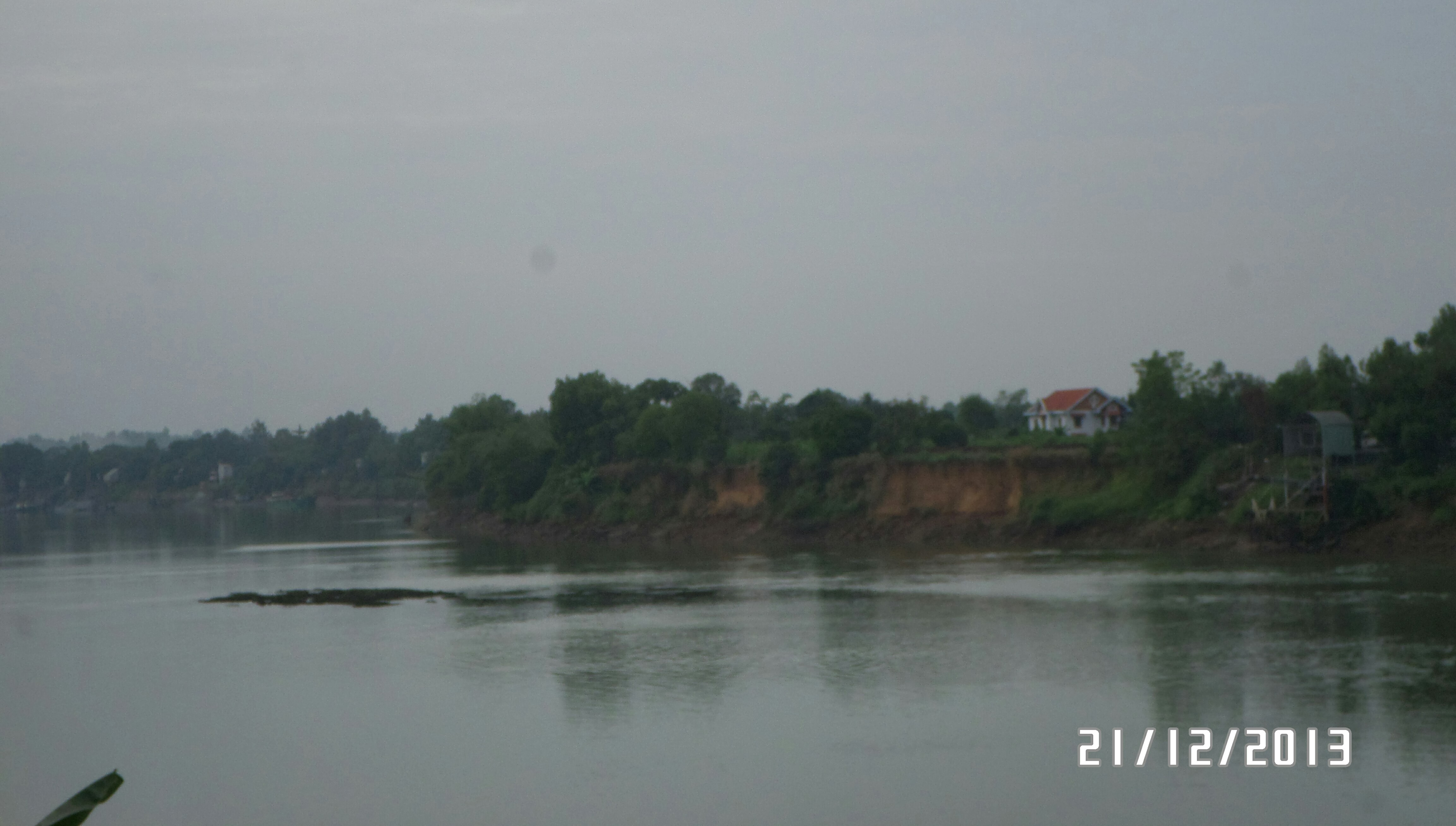
- Đồng Nai River in Thường Tân
- Interactive map of Thường Tân
- Coordinates: 11°01′51″N 106°54′33″E
- Country: Vietnam
- Municipality: Ho Chi Minh City
- Established: June 16, 2025

Area
  - Total: 46.60 sq mi (120.70 km^{2})

Population (2024)
  - Total: 21,238
  - Density: 455.73/sq mi (175.96/km^{2})
- Time zone: UTC+07:00 (Indochina Time)
- Administrative code: 25909

Thường Tân (Vietnamese: Xã Thường Tân) is a commune of Ho Chi Minh City, Vietnam. It is one of the 168 new wards, communes and special zones of the city following the reorganization in 2025.

== History ==
On June 16, 2025, the National Assembly Standing Committee issued Resolution No. 1685/NQ-UBTVQH15 on the arrangement of commune-level administrative units of Ho Chi Minh City in 2025 (effective from June 16, 2025). Accordingly, the entire land area and population of Thường Tân, Lạc An, Hiếu Liêm communes and part of Tân Mỹ commune of the former Bắc Tân Uyên district will be integrated into a new commune named Thường Tân (Clause 136, Article 1).
