= Eastern Construction Company =

Eastern Construction Company was a Filipino organisation from the Vietnam War era. Described in Neil Sheehan's The Pentagon Papers as "private", "public-service", and "anti-communist", ECC provided personnel to Vietnam and Laos in capacities that served paramilitary ends, if not actually paramilitary in and of themselves.

In January 1959, the Programs Evaluation Office of the U.S. Embassy in Laos contracted with Eastern Construction Company to supply instructors to the Royal Lao Air Force and the Lao equivalent of their navy, the River Flotilla on the Mekong River. A second contingent of 103 ECCOIL employees arrived in Laos in mid-1959.

== Bibliography ==
- Conboy, Kenneth and James Morrison, Shadow War: The CIA's Secret War in Laos. Paladin Press, 1995, ISBN 0-87364-825-0.
- Sheehan, Neil. The Pentagon Papers. New York: Bantam Books (1971). ISBN 0-552-64917-1.
