= Tân Lợi =

- Commune
- Interactive map of Tân Lợi
- Coordinates: 11°25′27″N 107°1′43″E
- Country: Vietnam
- City: Đồng Nai
- Region: Southeast
- Established: 2002

Area
  - Total: 379.8 km^{2} (146.6 sq mi)

Population (31 December 2025)
  - Total: 14,705
  - Density: 38/km^{2} (98/sq mi)
- Website: tanloi.dongnai.gov.vn

Tân Lợi is a commune in Đồng Nai, Vietnam.

On 12 June 2025, the National Assembly of Vietnam adopted Resolution No. 202/2025/QH15 on the reorganization of provincial-level administrative units, which took effect on the same day. Under the resolution, Bình Phước province was merged into Đồng Nai.

On 16 June 2025, the Standing Committee of the National Assembly of Vietnam adopted Resolution No. 1662/NQ-UBTVQH15 on the reorganization of commune-level administrative units in Đồng Nai. Under the resolution, the entire area and population of Tân Lợi, Tân Hòa and Tân Hưng communes, formerly in Đồng Phú district, Bình Phước province, were consolidated to form a new commune named Tân Lợi.
