= Phú Giáo district =

Coordinates: 11°17′39″N 106°48′28″E

Phú Giáo District Huyện Phú Giáo
- District
- Interactive map of Phú Giáo District
- Country: Vietnam
- Region: Southeast
- Province: Bình Dương
- Capital: Phước Vĩnh

Area
  - Total: 209 sq mi (541 km^{2})

Population (2003)
  - Total: 67,252
- Time zone: UTC+7 (Indochina Time)

Phú Giáo is a former rural district of Bình Dương province in the Southeast region of Vietnam. As of 2003 the district had a population of 67,252. The district covers 541 km^{2}. The district capital lies at Phước Vĩnh.

== Administrative divisions ==
The district contains one township, Phước Vĩnh, and the following communes: Tân Long, Tam Lập, An Long, An Bình, Tân Hiệp, An Linh, Phước Sang, Vĩnh Hòa, Phước Hòa and An Thái.
