= Bắc Tân Uyên district =

Bắc Tân Uyên district Huyện Bắc Tân Uyên
- District
- Interactive map of Bắc Tân Uyên district
- Coordinates: 11°8′24″N 106°51′26″E
- Country: Vietnam
- Region: Southeast
- Province: Bình Dương
- Capital: Tân Thành

Area
  - Total: 154.78 sq mi (400.87 km^{2})

Population (2018)
  - Total: 62,481
- Time zone: UTC+7 (Indochina Time)

Bắc Tân Uyên (North Tân Uyên) is a former rural district of Bình Dương province in the Southeast region of Vietnam. It was established on December 29, 2013.

== Administrative divisions ==
Bắc Tân Uyên is divided into 1 town and 9 rural communes:

- Tân Thành town
- Tân Bình
- Bình Mỹ
- Tân Lập
- Tân Định
- Lạc An
- Hiếu Liêm
- Đất Cuốc
- Thường Tân
- Tân Mỹ
