= List of weapons of the Laotian Civil War =

The Laotian Civil War was a military conflict of the Cold War in Asia that pitted the guerrilla forces of the Marxist-oriented Pathet Lao against the armed and security forces of the Kingdom of Laos (French: Royaume du Laos), led by the conservative Royal Lao Government, between 1960 and 1975. Main combatants comprised:

- The Royal Lao Armed Forces (French: Forces Armées du Royaume), best known by its French acronym FAR, were the official Military of the Kingdom of Laos from 1959 to 1975. Subordinated to the Ministry of Defense of the Royal Lao Government at the capital Vientiane, the FAR branches were organized as follows:
  - Royal Lao Army (French: Armée Royale du Laos – ARL)
  - Royal Lao Air Force (French: Aviation Royale Laotiènne – AVRL)
  - Royal Lao Navy (French: Marine Royale Laotiènne – MRL)
- Paramilitary security forces:
  - Royal Lao Police (French: Police Royale Laotiènne – PRL)
  - Directorate of National Coordination (DNC) Security Agency; a.k.a. Border Police (French: Police de Frontiers), active from 1960 to 1965.

To meet the threat represented by the Pathet Lao insurgency, the Laotian Armed Forces depended on a small French military training mission (French: Mission Militaire Française près du Gouvernment Royale du Laos or MMF-GRL), headed by a general officer, an exceptional arrangement permitted under the 1955 Geneva Accords, as well as covert assistance from the United States in the form of the Programs Evaluation Office (PEO), established on 15 December 1955, replaced in 1961 by the Military Assistance Advisory Group (Laos), which was later changed in September 1962 into the Requirements Office. Between 1962 and 1971, the U.S. provided Laos with direct military assistance, but not including the cost of equipping and training irregular and paramilitary forces by the Central Intelligence Agency (CIA). In addition to U.S. covert support, the FAR received further military assistance from the United Kingdom, Thailand, Burma, the Philippines, the Republic of China (Taiwan), Cambodia, South Vietnam, South Korea, Japan, Indonesia, Singapore, Malaysia and Australia.

- The Neutralist Armed Forces (French: Forces Armées Neutralistes – FAN), a dissident splinter faction of the FAR led by Captain (later, Major general) Kong Le, active from 1961 to 1966, which received support from North Vietnam, the Soviet Union, Indonesia, France and the United States.
- The irregular Anti-communist Special Guerrilla Units (SGU), also collectively referred to as the "Clandestine Army" or "Secret Army" (French: Armée Clandestine or Armée Secréte), recruited from Laos' ethnic minorities such as the Hmong (Meo), Yao (Iu-Mien), Mien, Lao Theung (Hune) and Lao Sung hill tribes, was led by Royal Lao Government Minister Touby Lyfoung, Major general Vang Pao and Brigadier general Thao Ty. Created from irregular ethnic guerrilla units or "partisans" (French: Maquisards) raised earlier by the French GCMA Laos during the First Indochina War, the SGUs were in reality secretly organized, trained and armed by the CIA since the late 1950s and early 1960s.

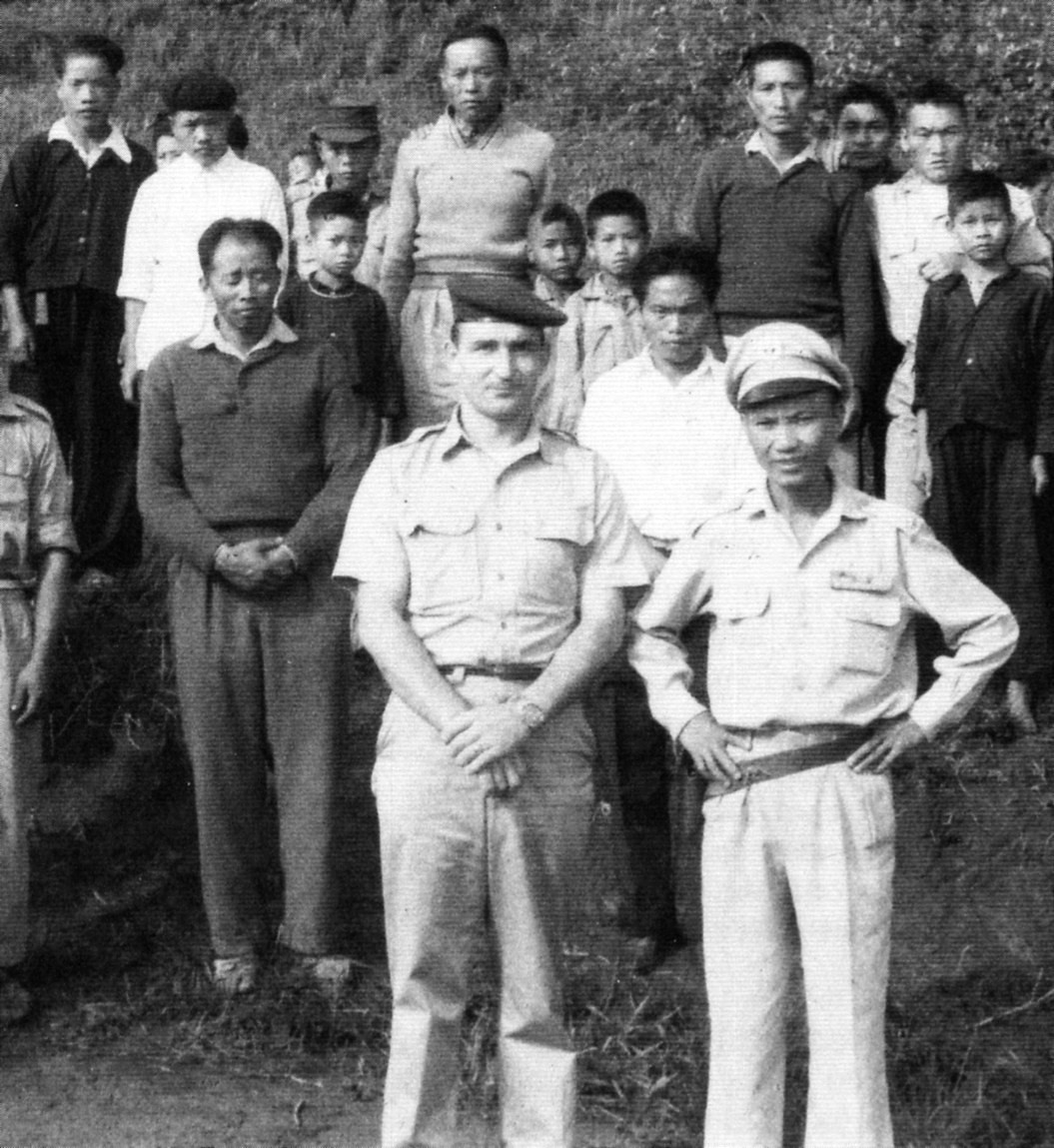
PEO adviser Jack F. Mathews with then Major Vang Pao, commander of the 10éme Bataillon de Infanterie (10 BI), at Nong Net, July 1960.

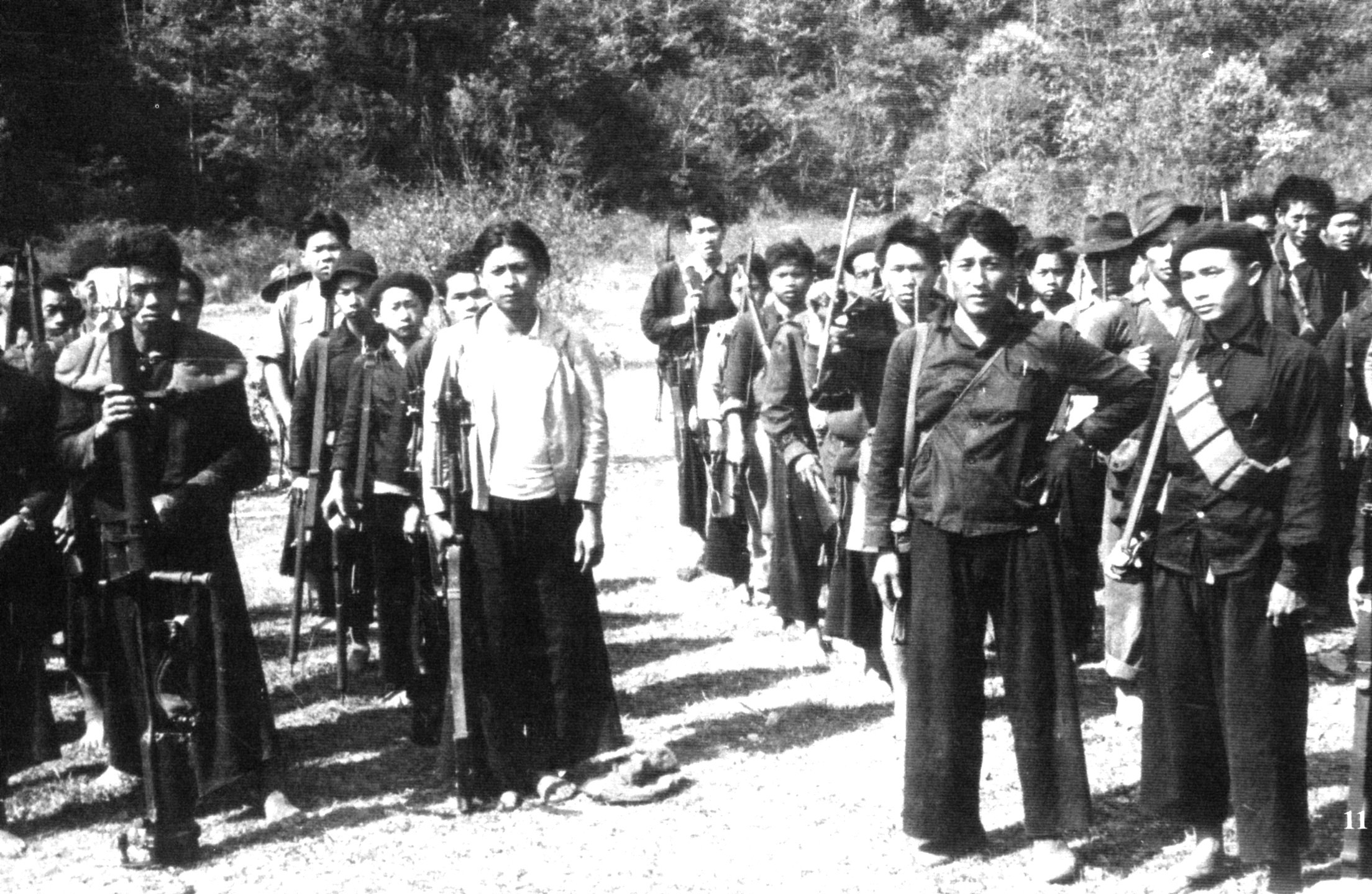
An Auto Defense de Choc (ADC) Hmong guerrilla company assembles at Phou Vieng, Spring 1961.

- The Pathet Lao, also known as the "Lao People's Party" (1955–1972) and later the "Lao People's Revolutionary Party" (1972–present) led by Prince Souphanouvong, and its military wing the Lao People's Liberation Army (LPLA), which was trained and armed by North Vietnam, the Soviet Union, the People's Republic of China, North Korea, Indonesia, Albania, East Germany, Romania and Cuba.

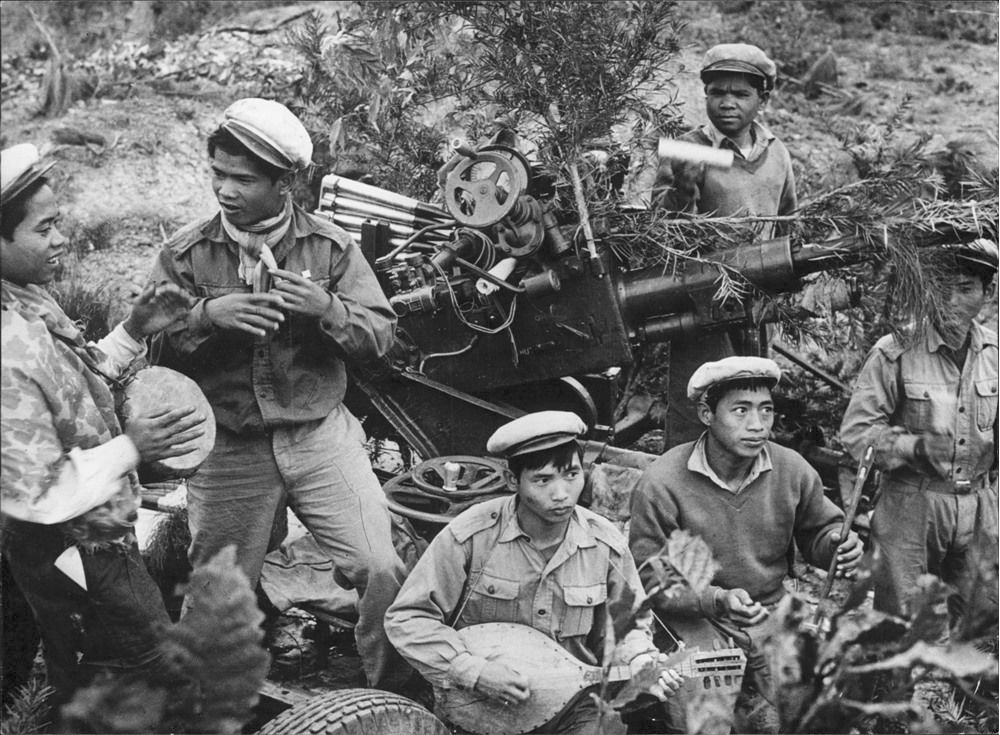
Pathet Lao's Laotian People's Liberation Army (LPLA) Anti-aircraft artillery crew, 1967.

- The People's Army of Vietnam (PAVN), also designated the "North Vietnamese Army" (NVA), which received support from the Soviet Union, the People's Republic of China, North Korea, East Germany, Czechoslovakia, Poland, Hungary, Bulgaria and Yugoslavia.
- The Army of the Republic of Vietnam (ARVN), which received support from the United States, Australia, Canada, France, West Germany, Israel, Japan, New Zealand, Philippines, South Korea, Pahlavi Iran, Francoist Spain, Taiwan, Thailand and the United Kingdom.

An eclectic variety of weapons was used by all sides in the Laotian Civil War. Laotian regular FAR and FAN and irregular SGUs weaponry in the early days of the War was a hodgepodge, with most of their combat units equipped in a haphazard way with an array of French, American, Australian, British and German weapon systems, mostly of WWII-vintage, either drawn from First Indochina War stocks handed down by the French or secretly provided by the Americans. After 1955 however, the FAR began the process of standardization on U.S. equipment, with its airborne and infantry units first taking delivery of semi-automatic and automatic small-arms of WWII/Korean War-vintage in late 1959, followed by the delivery between 1963 and 1971 of more modern military equipments, which included aircraft, armored and transport vehicles, and long-range artillery pieces. In 1969 secret deliveries of modern U.S. small-arms arrived in Laos, and were initially only given to the Laotian Royal Guard and airborne units; standardisation in U.S. fully-automatic infantry weapons in the RLA and the irregular SGUs was completed by 1971, replacing much of the older weaponry. Captured infantry weapons of Soviet and Chinese origin were also employed by elite commando or airborne units and the irregular SGUs while on special operations in the enemy-held areas of north-eastern and south-eastern Laos.

During the early phase of the War, the Pathet Lao likewise was largely equipped with WWII-vintage French, Japanese, American, British, German, Chinese and Czechoslovak weapons either pilfered from French colonial forces during the First Indochina War, seized from Laotian FAR units or provided by the Viet Minh and subsequently by North Vietnam. As the war progressed, these obsolete weapons began to be partially superseded by more modern Eastern Bloc military hardware, including semi-automatic and fully automatic small-arms, artillery pieces, armored and transport vehicles, and aircraft of Soviet, Chinese and Hungarian origin, mostly being funnelled through the North Vietnamese. Although the Pathet Lao standardized on Soviet and Chinese weapons and equipment by the early 1970s, its guerrilla forces continued to make use of captured enemy stocks until the end of the War.

== Royal Lao Armed Forces, FAN and SGUs equipment ==
=== Revolvers ===
Received from the U.S. Government, used by Laotian government officials and military officers.

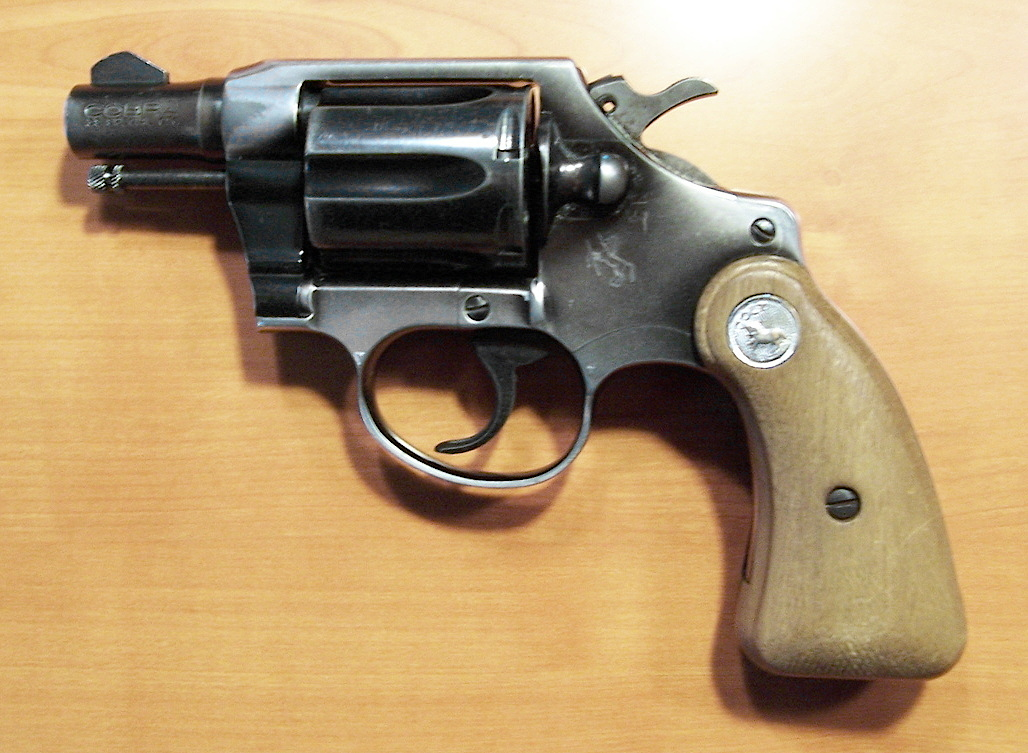
Colt Cobra .38 Special snub-nose revolver

- M1917 revolver
- Smith & Wesson Model 10
- Smith & Wesson Model 15
- Colt Cobra .38 Special snub-nose revolver
- Smith & Wesson Model 49 Bodyguard .38 Special

=== Pistols ===
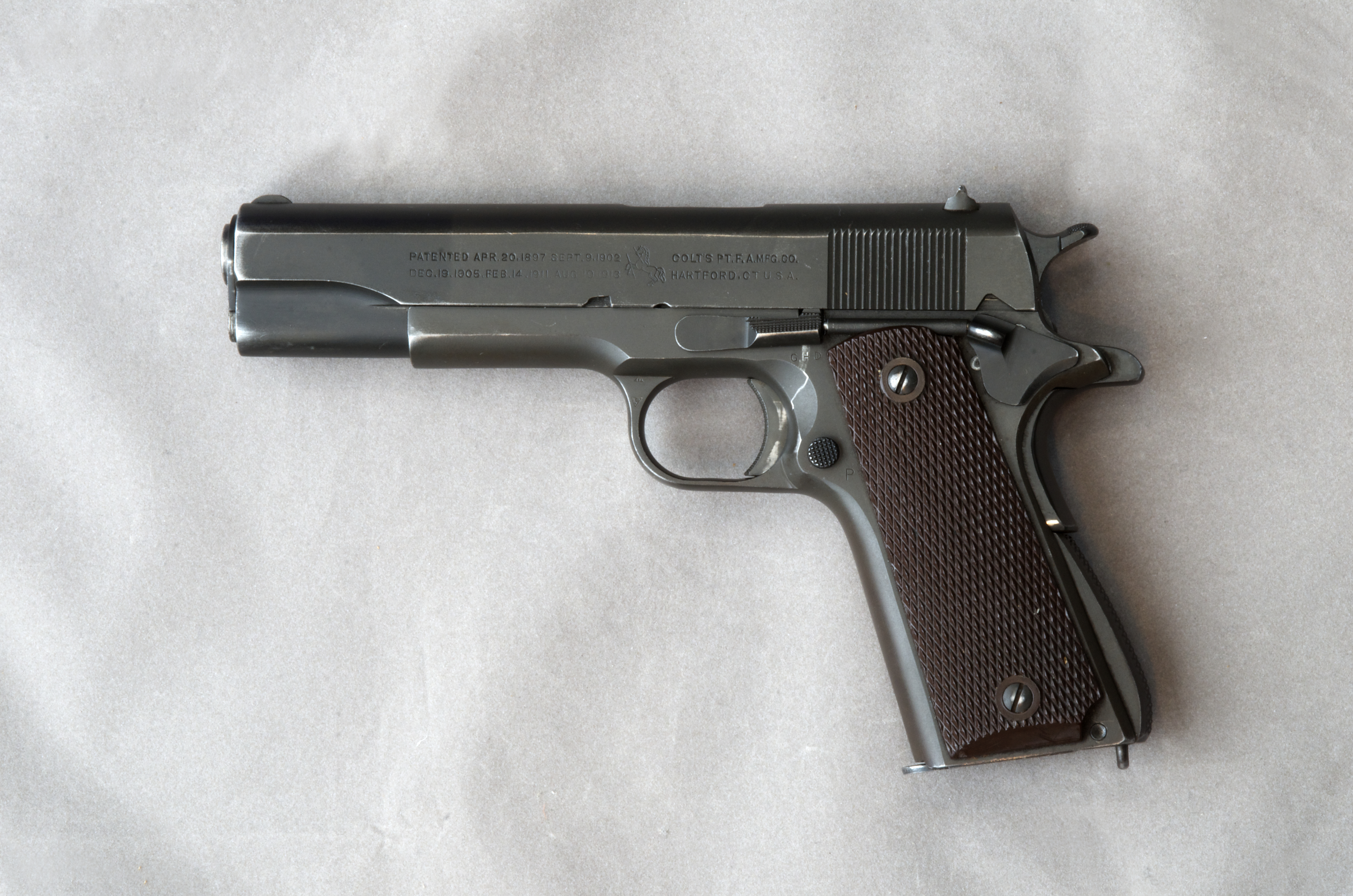
M1911A1 pistol

- Modèle 1935A pistol (7.65mm Longue): Received from France during the First Indochina War.
- MAS-35-S pistol (7.65mm Longue): Received from France during the First Indochina War.
- Luger P08 pistol: Received from France during the First Indochina War.
- Walther P38: Received from France during the First Indochina War.
- Colt.45 M1911A1
- Smith & Wesson Model 39
- Tokarev TT-33: Captured.
- Makarov pistol: Captured.

=== Submachine guns ===
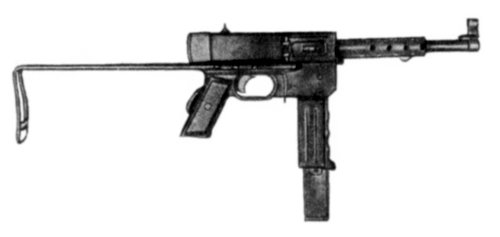
MAT-49 Submachine gun

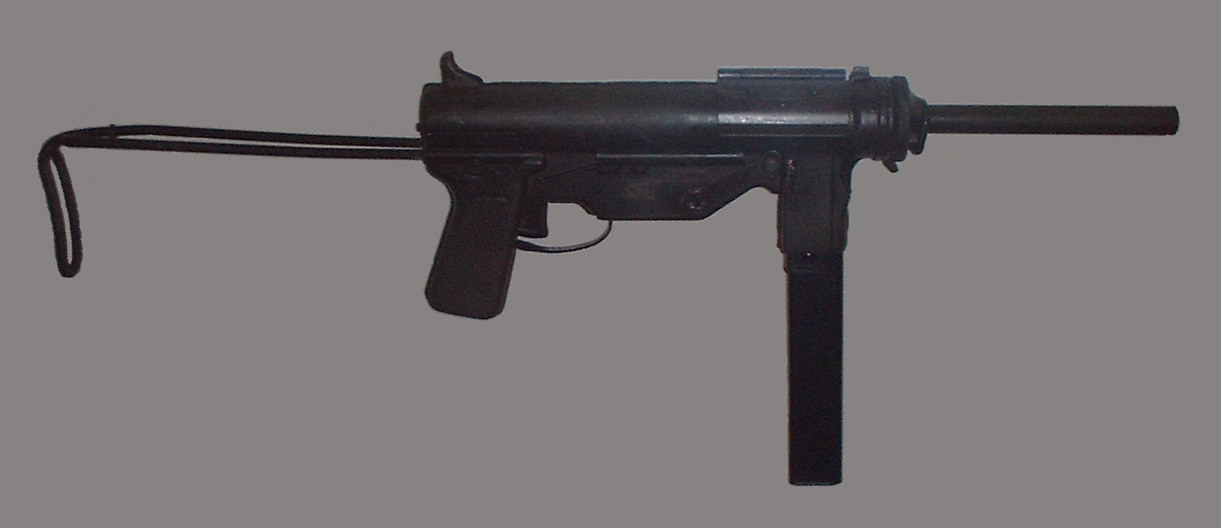
M3 submachine gun

- MAS-38: Received from France during the First Indochina War.
- MAT-49: Received from France during the First Indochina War.
- Sterling submachine gun: Limited quantities handed down by Britain.
- Owen submachine gun
- Sten submachine gun: Received from France during the First Indochina War.
- Carl Gustaf m/45 (a.k.a. "Swedish K"): used by Green Berets' advisors and CIA operatives.
- M1A1 Thompson
- M3/M3A1 Grease Gun: used by the Royal Lao Police Aerial Reinforcement Unit.
- PPSh-41: Provided to the FAN by the Soviet Union or captured.
- PPS-43: Captured.

=== Bolt-action rifles ===
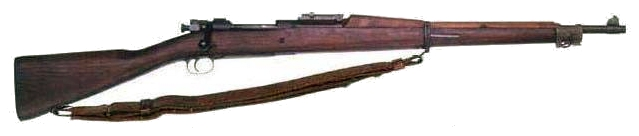
M1903 Springfield rifle

- MAS-36: Received from France during the First Indochina War.
- MAS-36 CR39 folding-stock paratrooper rifle: Received from France during the First Indochina War.
- M1903 Springfield: Limited quantities, received from France during the First Indochina War and the United States.
- Lee–Enfield SMLE Mk III: Limited quantities, received from France during the First Indochina War.

=== Carbines ===
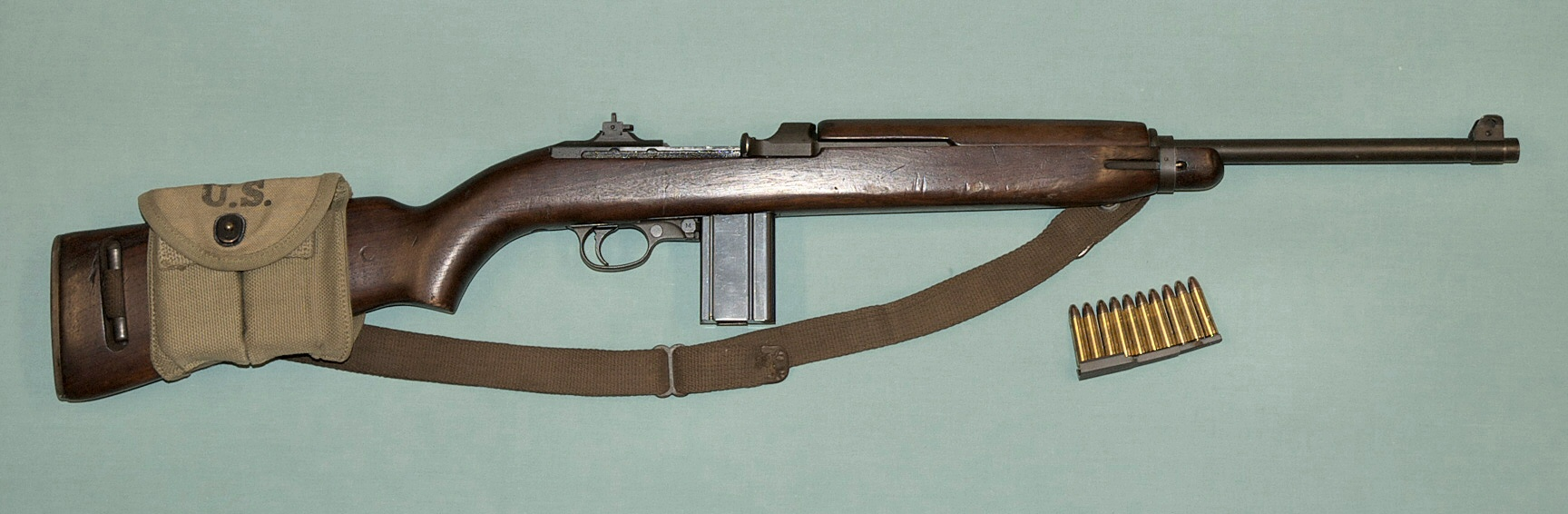
M1 Carbine

- MAS-49/56 carbine: Received from France after the First Indochina War.
- M1 Carbine: M1 & M2 models were standard issue concurrent with the M1 Garand rifle before receiving the M16.
- M1A1 paratrooper carbine
- M2 Carbine: Full automatic variant.
- CAR-15 Assault carbine

=== Sniper rifles ===
- Springfield M1903A4 sniper rifle
- MAS-49/56 sniper carbine
- M21 Sniper Weapon System: used by MACV–SOG teams.
- M8C .50-calibre spotting rifle: used as a sniper weapon.

=== Battle rifles ===
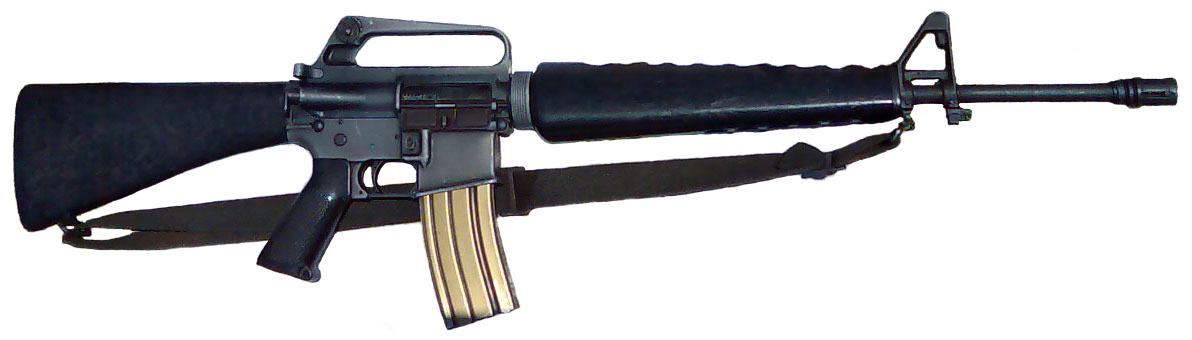
M16A1 was the standard Royal Lao Army (RLA) issue assault rifle

- MAS-49 semi-automatic rifle: Received from France during the First Indochina War.
- M1 Garand semi-automatic rifle
- SKS semi-automatic rifle: Captured.
- L1A1 SLR Assault rifle: Limited quantities handed down by Britain.
- M16A1 Assault rifle
- AK-47: Captured.
- Type 56 assault rifle: Captured.
- AKM: Captured.

=== Shotguns ===
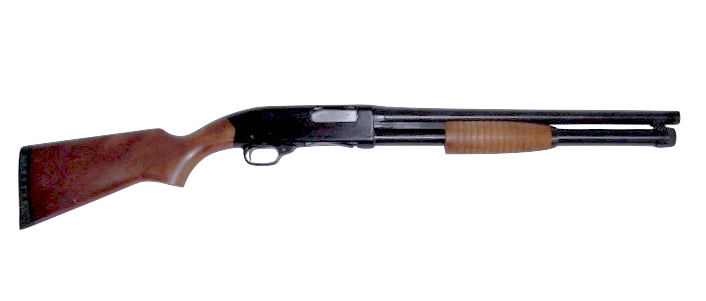
Winchester Model 1200 pump-action shotgun

- Winchester Model 1200 pump-action shotgun

=== Light machine guns ===
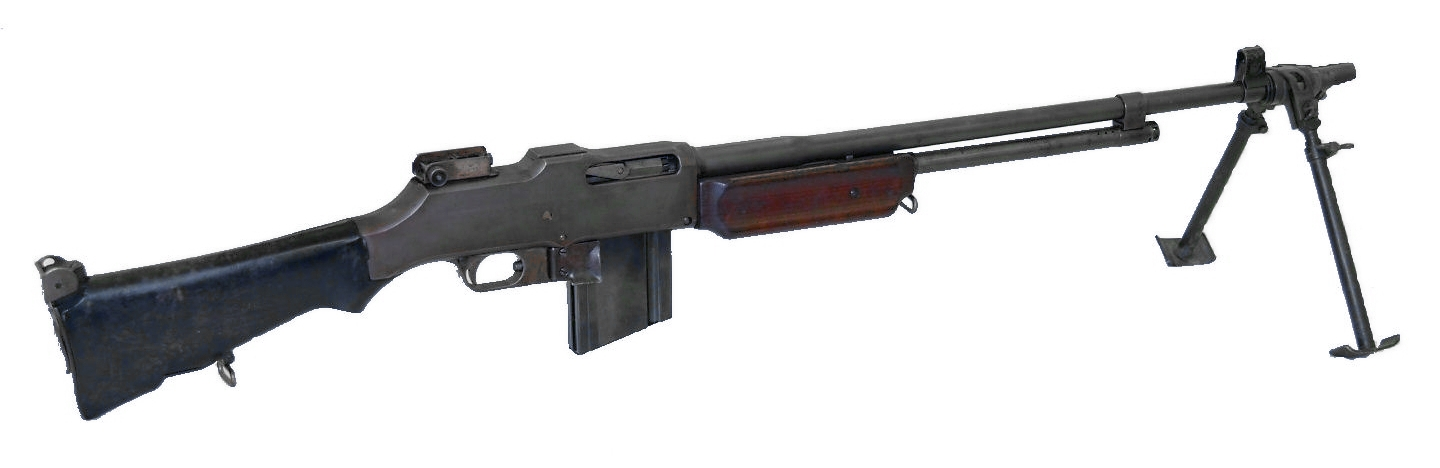
M1918A2 Browning Automatic Rifle

- FM 24/29: Received from France during the First Indochina War.
- Bren: Received from France during the First Indochina War.
- M1918A2 BAR
- M1919A6 light machine gun

=== General-purpose machine guns ===
- M60
- RPD: Provided to the FAN by the Soviet Union or captured.

=== Medium and heavy machine guns ===
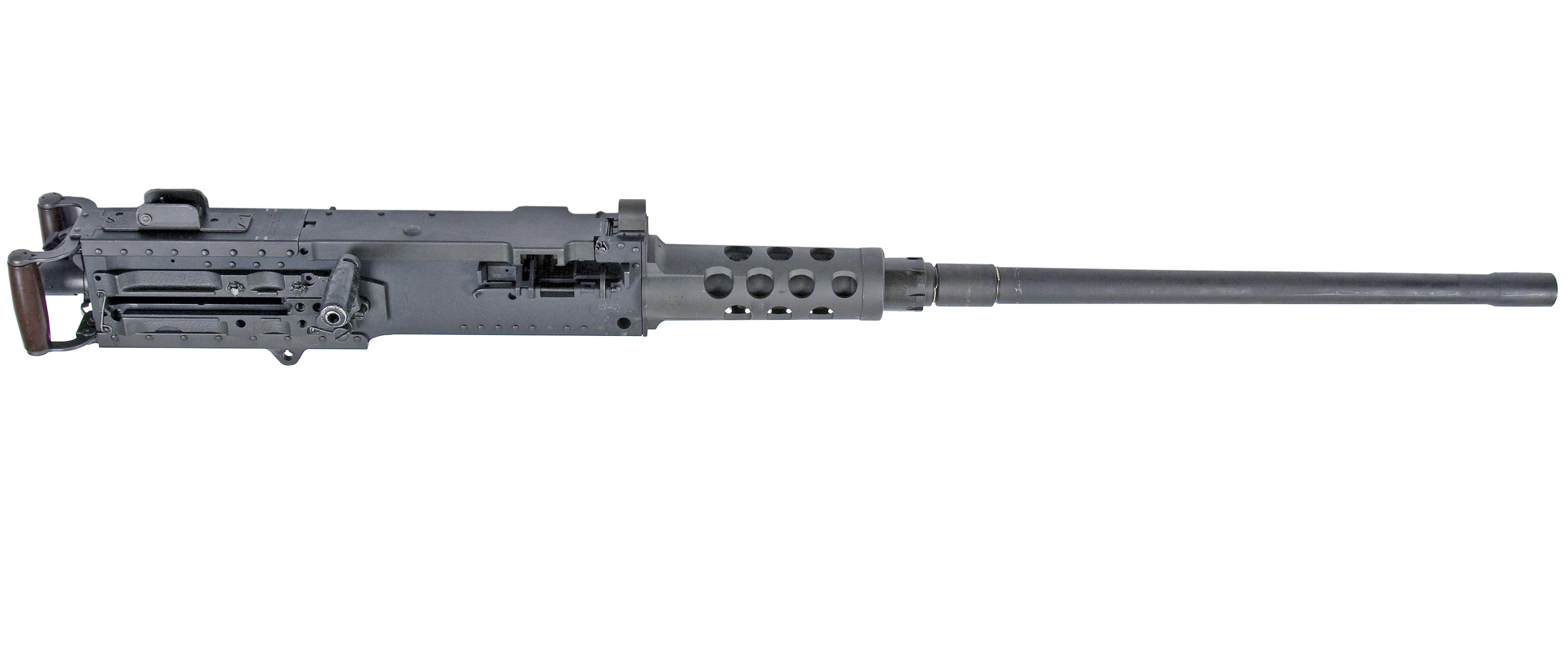
M2HB heavy machine gun

- MAC-31A2 7.65mm: Received from France during the First Indochina War.
- Browning M1919A4 .30 Cal
- Browning M2HB .50 Cal
- SG-43/SGM Goryunov: Captured.
- DShKM: Captured.

=== Grenade systems ===
- Alsetex OF37 grenade: Received from France during the First Indochina War.
- Alsetex DF37 grenade: Received from France during the First Indochina War.
- F-1 hand grenade: Received from France during the First Indochina War.
- Mark 2 "Pineapple" fragmentation hand/rifle grenade
- M26 fragmentation hand grenade
- M59 "Baseball" hand grenade
- M61 fragmentation hand grenade
- M67 fragmentation hand grenade
- M18 colored smoke hand grenade
- M34 white phosphorus/smoke grenade

=== Land mine systems ===
- M2 bounding anti-personnel mine
- M18A1 Claymore anti-personnel mine
- M14 anti-personnel blast mine
- M16 bounding anti-personnel fragmentation mine
- M15 anti-tank mine
- M19 anti-tank mine
- M24 off-route anti-tank mine: limited use by MACV–SOG teams.

=== Rocket systems ===
- 2.75 inch rocket launcher
- 5-inch high-velocity aircraft rocket launcher
- DKB Grad-P 122 mm Light portable rocket system: Captured.

=== Anti-tank rockets ===
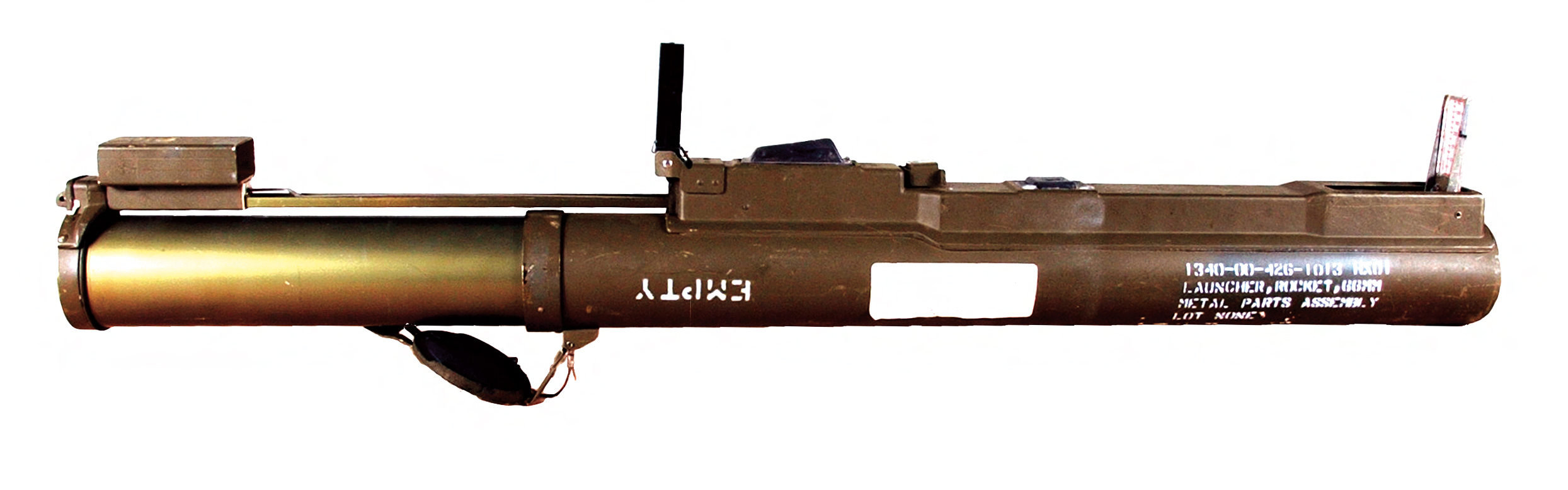
M72 LAW

- M20A1 3.5 inch Super Bazooka
- M72 LAW
- RPG-2: Captured.
- RPG-7: Captured.

=== Grenade launchers ===
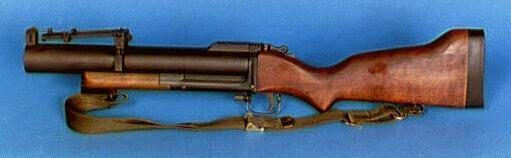
M79 grenade launcher

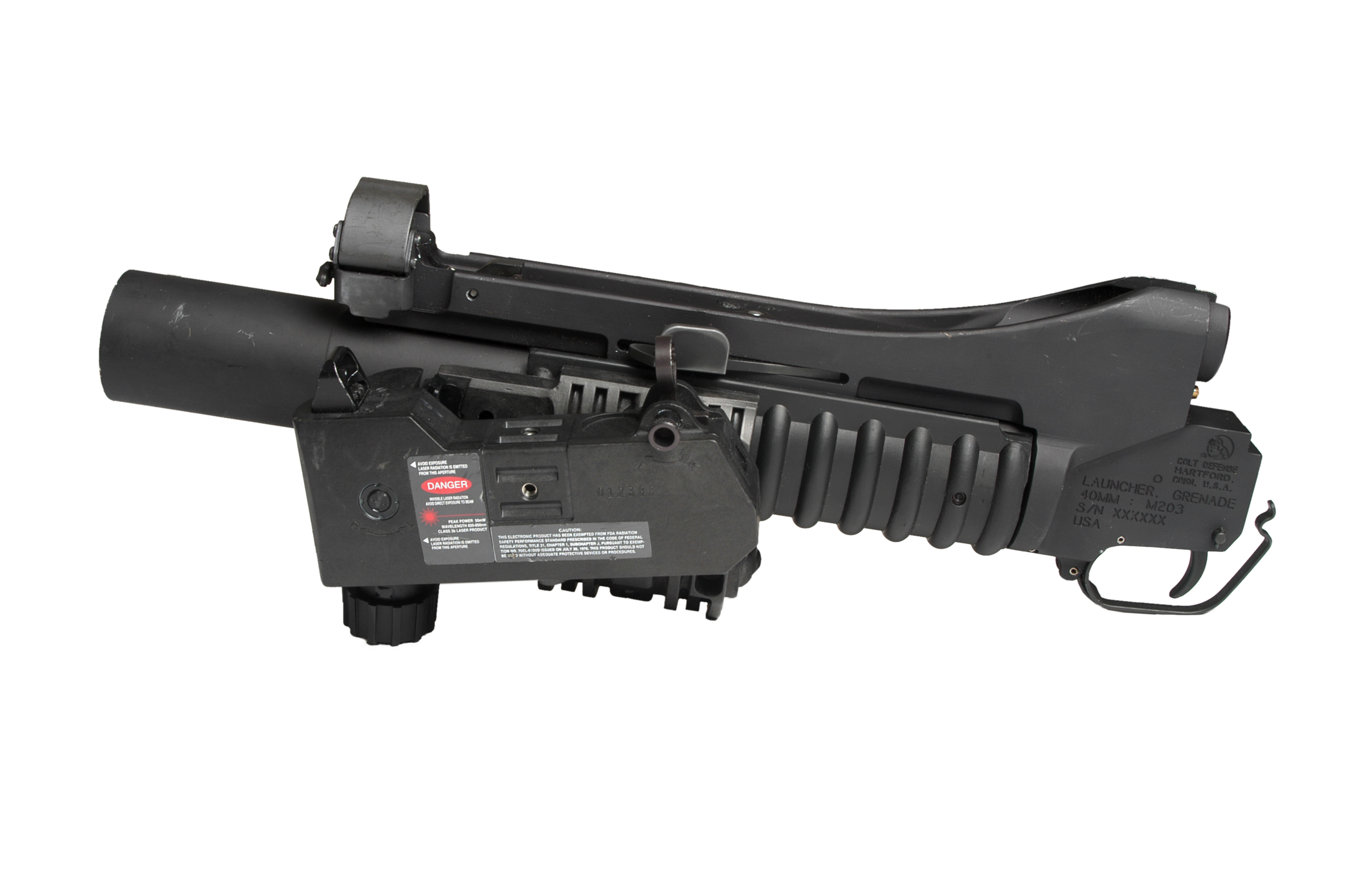
M203 grenade launcher

- M79
- XM-148
- M203

=== Recoilless rifles ===
- M18A1 57 mm
- M20 75 mm
- M67 90 mm (shoulder-fired)
- M40A1 106 mm

=== Mortars ===
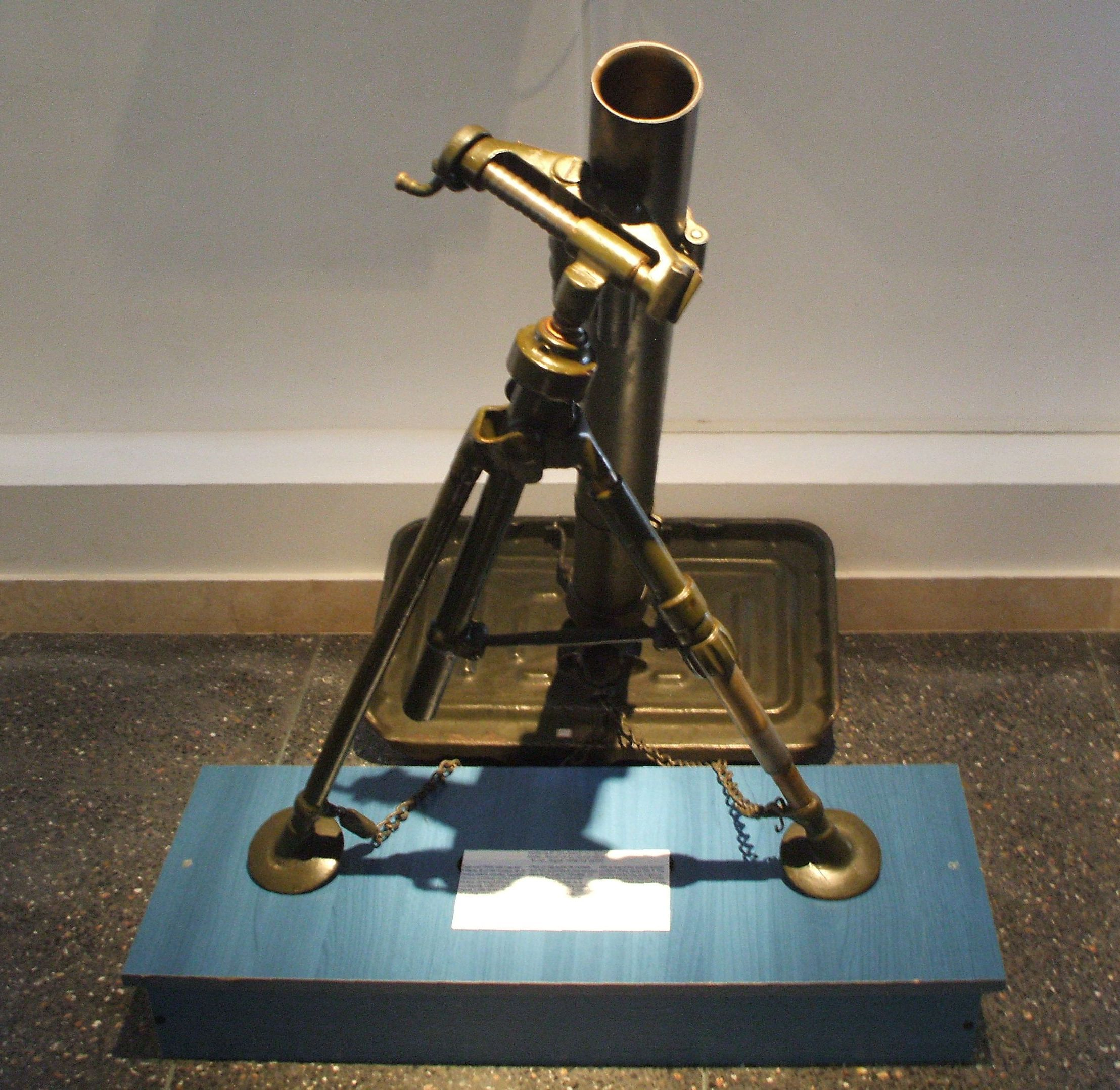
Brandt Mle 27(31) 81 mm mortar

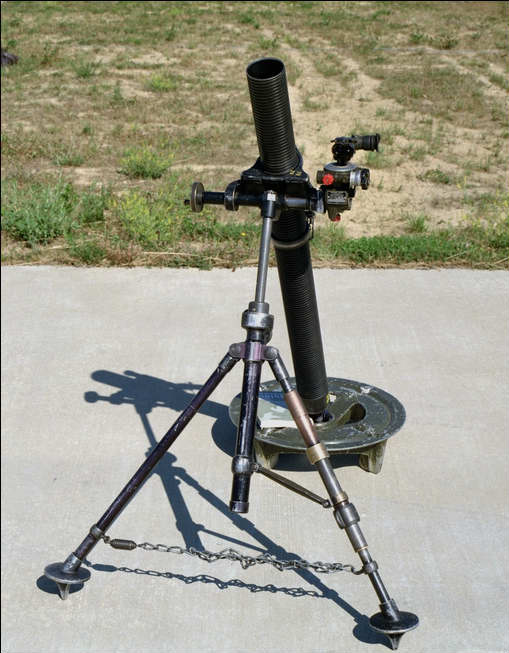
M29 81 mm mortar

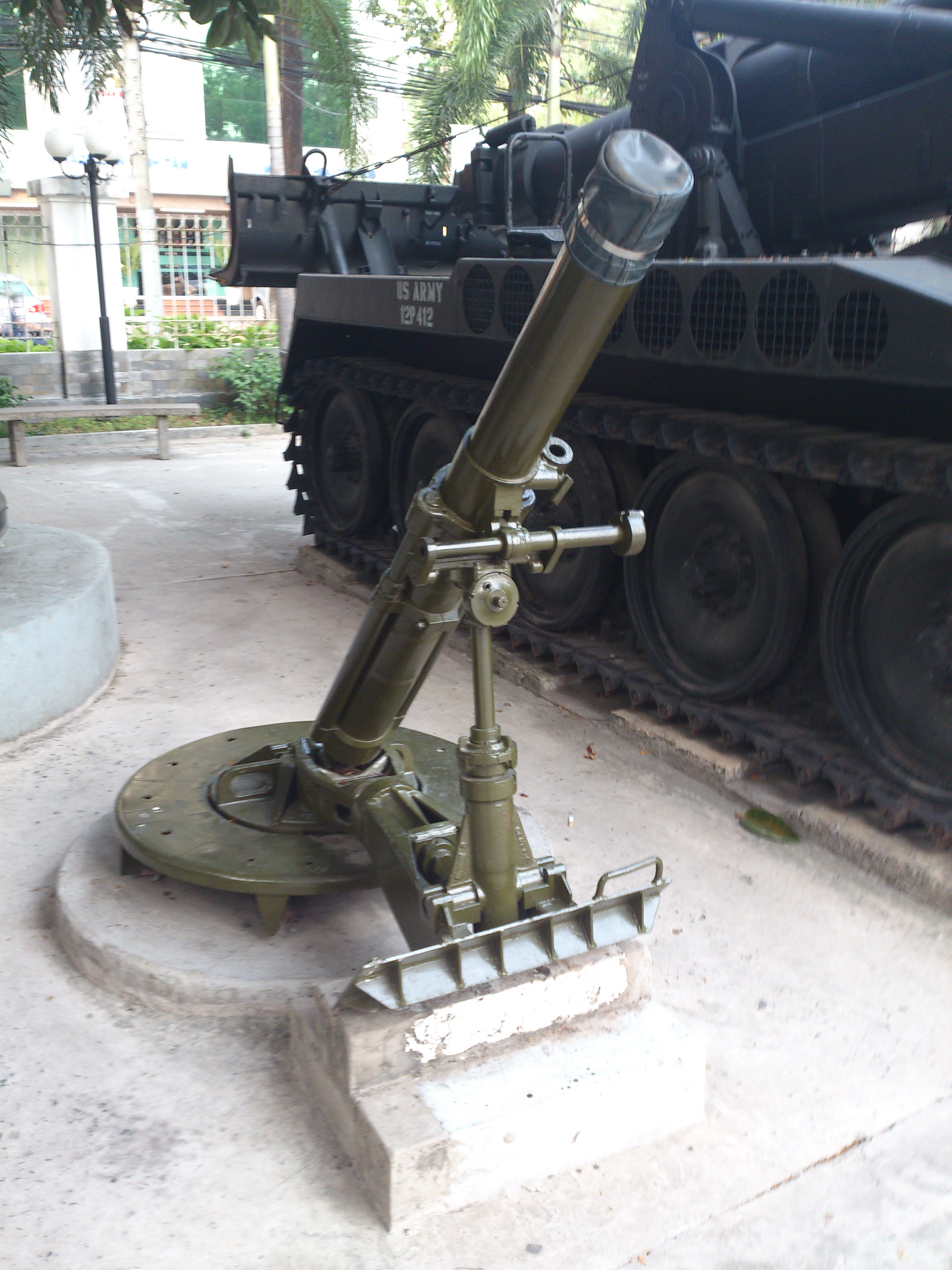
M30 4.2-inch (106.7 mm) mortar

- Brandt Mle 1935 60 mm mortar: Received from France during the First Indochina War.
- M19 60 mm mortar
- Brandt Mle 27/31 81 mm mortar: Received from France during the First Indochina War.
- M29 81 mm mortar
- M2 4.2-inch (107 mm) mortar
- M30 4.2-inch (106.7 mm) mortar

=== Howitzers ===
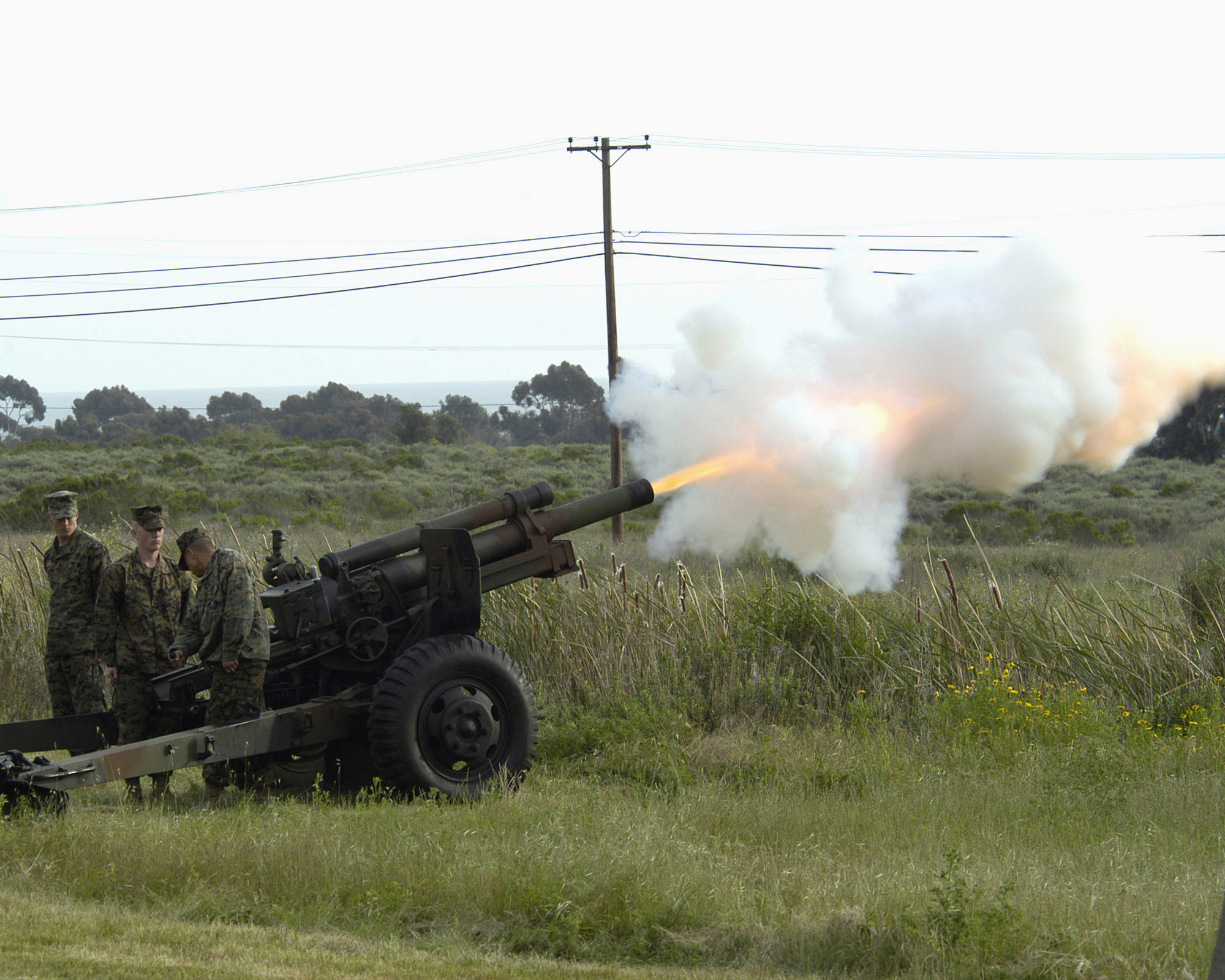
M101 105 mm howitzer

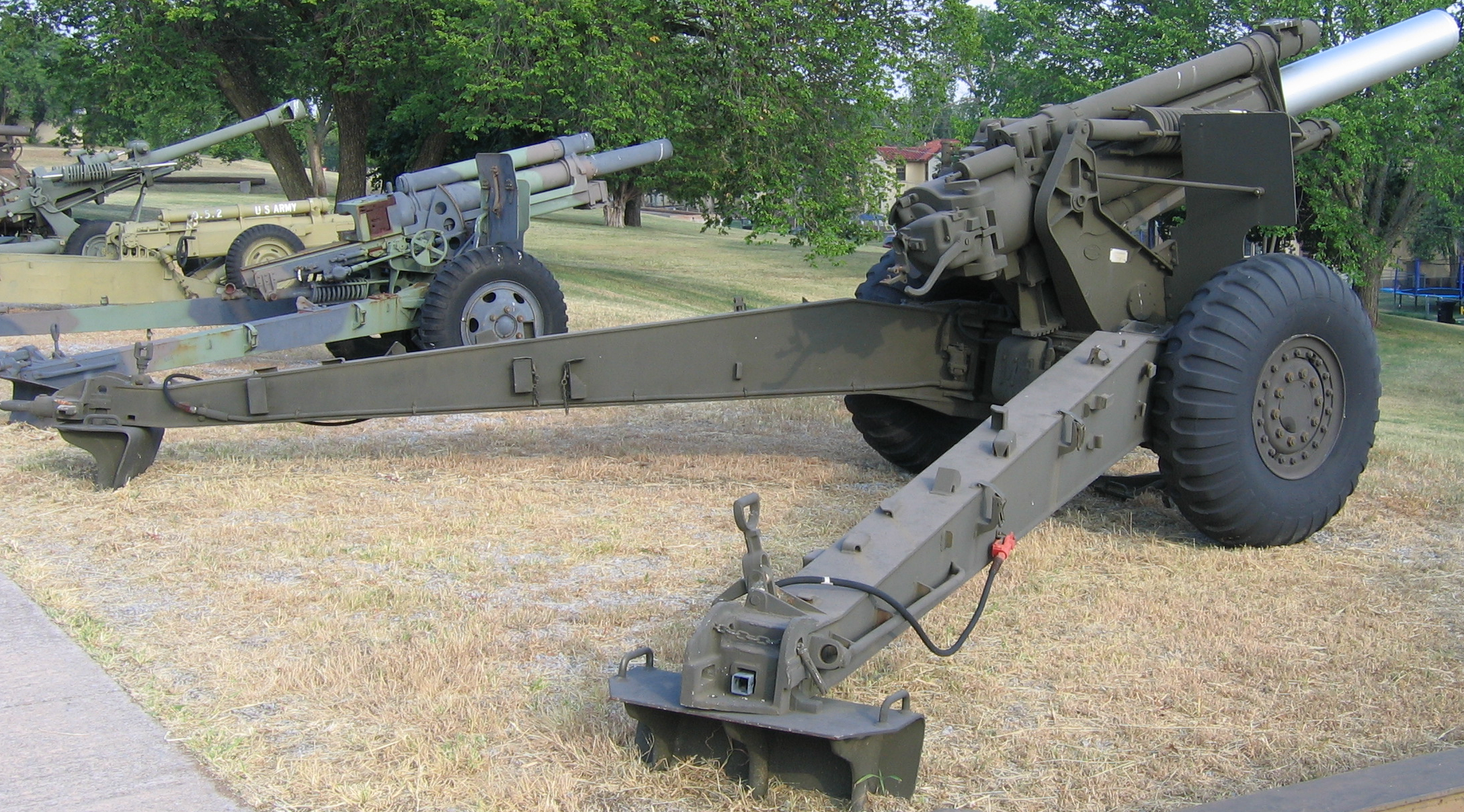
M114 155 mm howitzer

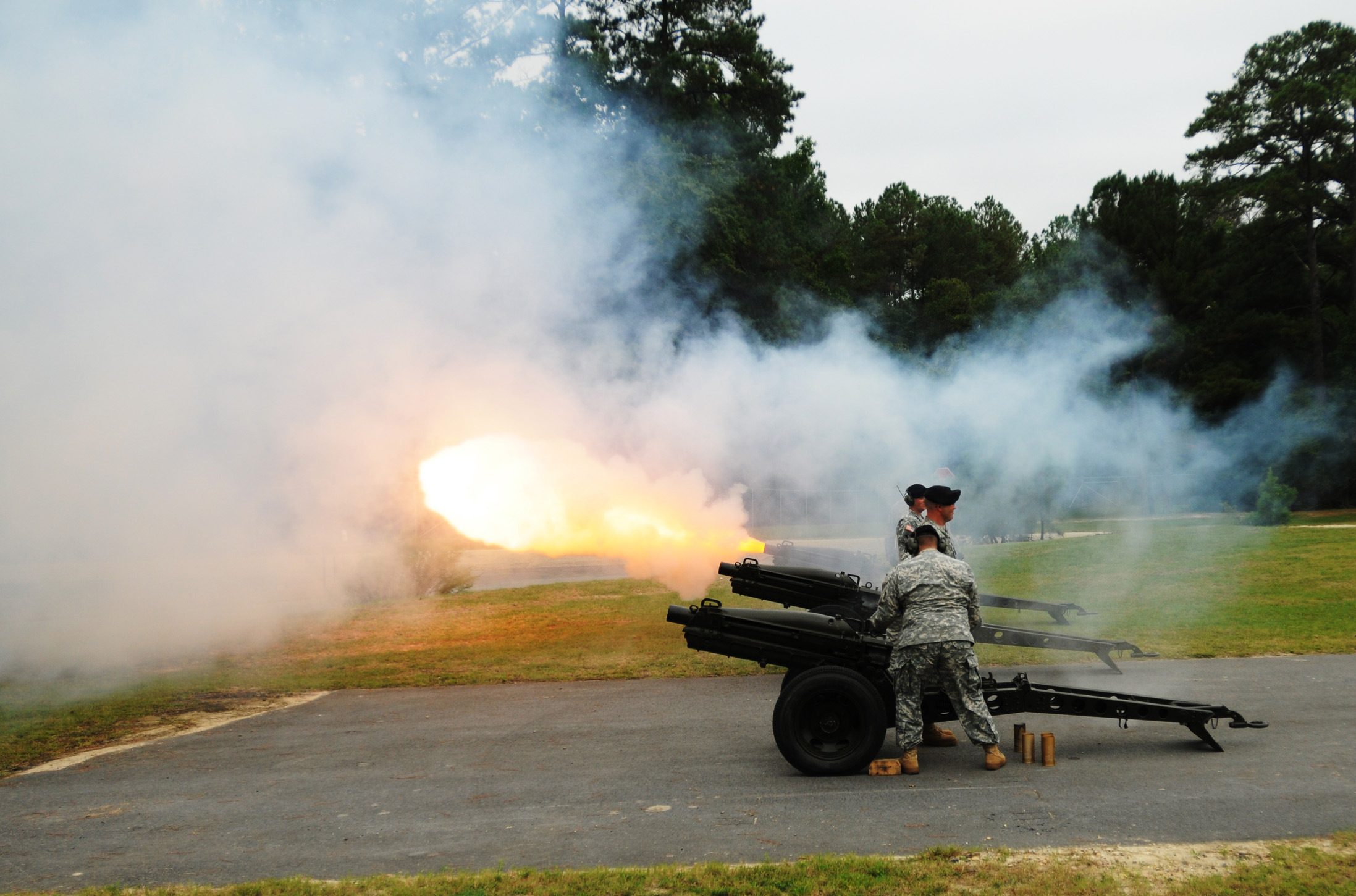
M116 75 mm pack howitzer

- M101A1 105 mm towed field howitzer
- M114A1 155 mm towed field howitzer
- M116 75 mm pack field howitzer

=== Air defense guns ===
- ZPU-2 14.5 mm double-barrelled AA autocannon: Provided to the FAN by the Soviet Union.
- M1939 (61-K) 37 mm: Provided to the FAN by the Soviet Union or captured.

=== Vehicles ===
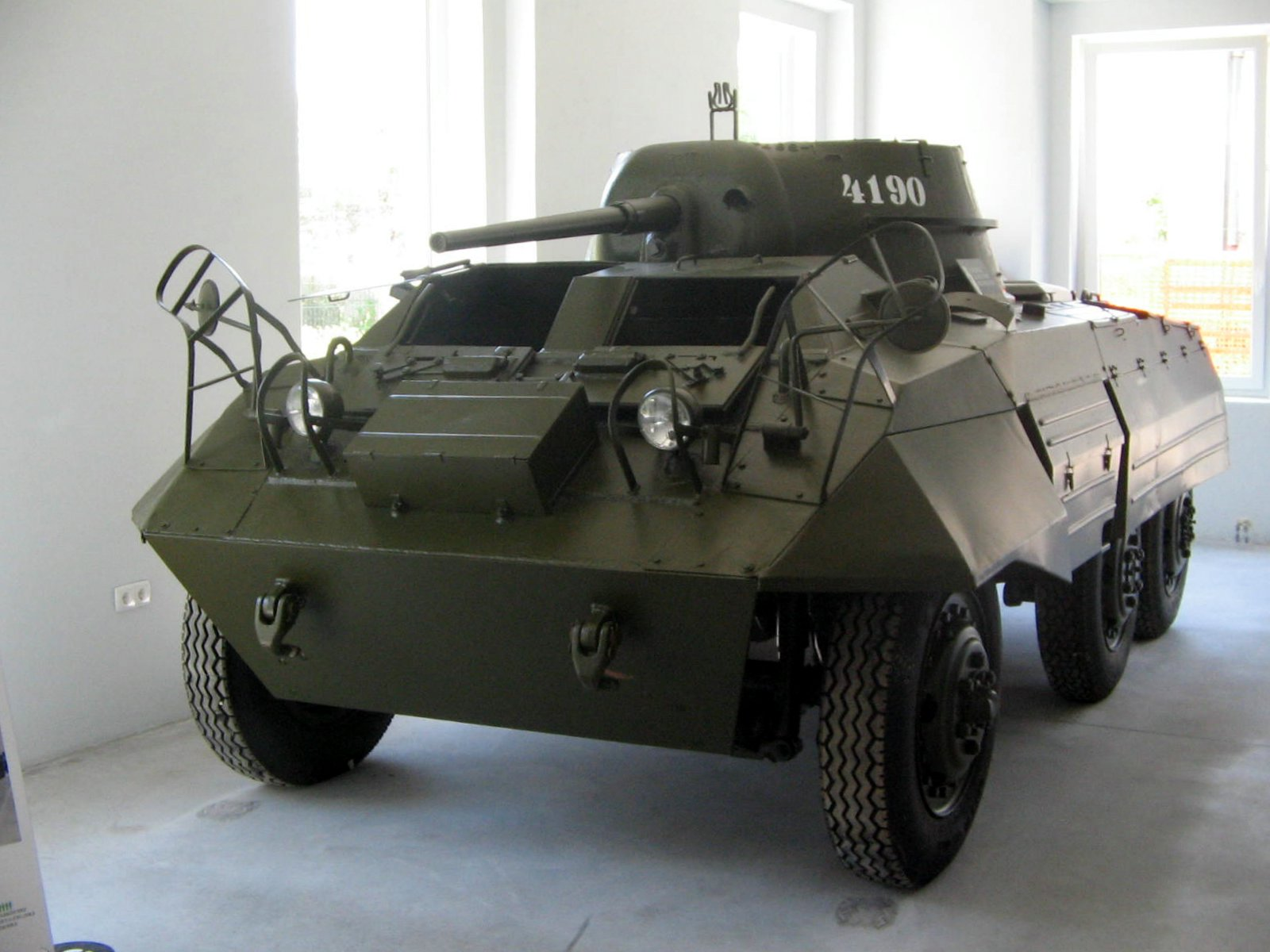
M8 Greyhound armoured car

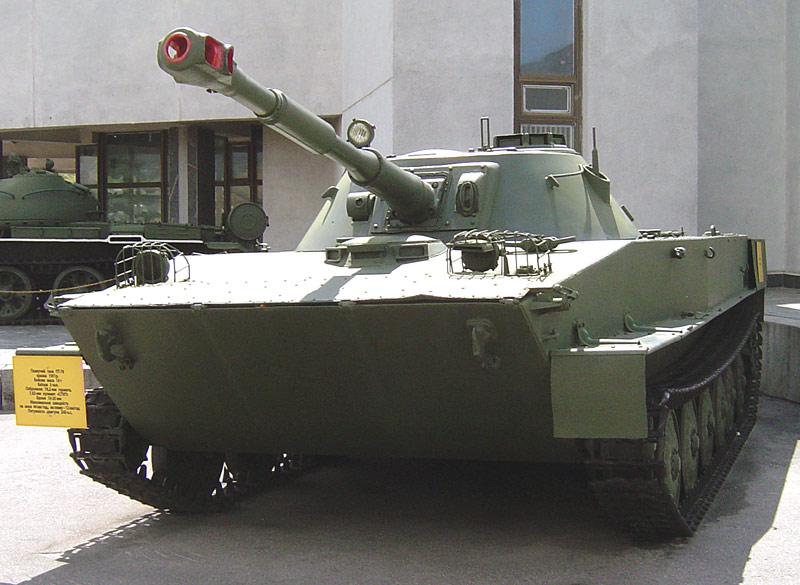
PT-76 light tank

- M5A1 Stuart light tank
- M24 Chaffee Light tank
- PT-76 amphibious light tank: Provided to the FAN by the Soviet Union or captured.
- M8 HMC 75 mm self-propelled howitzer
- M8 Greyhound armoured car
- M3A1 Scout Car
- M3 half-track
- V-100 Commando armoured car
- BTR-40 armored personnel carrier: Provided to the FAN by the Soviet Union.
- M113 armored personnel carrier
- Willys MB ¼-ton (4×4) jeep
- Willys M38 MC ¼-ton (4×4) jeep
- Willys M38A1 MD ¼-ton (4×4) jeep
- Jeepster Commando (4×4) hardtop Sport utility vehicle (SUV)
- Jeep Wagoneer (4×4) hardtop Sport utility vehicle (SUV)
- M151A1 ¼-ton (4×4) utility truck
- International Scout 800 (4×4) utility truck
- Land Rover series II (4×4) utility truck
- GAZ-69A (4×4) field car: Provided to the FAN by the Soviet Union or captured.
- Dodge WC-56/57 ¾-ton (4×4) Command car
- Dodge WC-51/52 ¾-ton (4×4) utility truck
- Dodge M37 ¾-ton (4×4) 1953 utility truck
- Chevrolet G506 1½-ton (4×4) cargo truck
- GMC CCKW 2½-ton (6×6) cargo truck
- ZIS-151 2½-ton (6×6) general-purpose truck: Provided to the FAN by the Soviet Union or captured.
- M35A2 2½-ton (6×6) cargo truck
- M809 5-ton (6×6) cargo truck

=== Helicopters ===
- Bell UH-1M Huey gunship
- Bell UH-1D/H Iroquois utility helicopter/transport
- Mil Mi-4 Hound transport: Provided to the FAN by the Soviet Union.
- Sikorsky H-19 Chickasaw transport
- Sikorsky H-34D Choctaw transport
- Sud Aviation SA 3130 Alouette II light helicopter
- Sud Aviation SA 316B Alouette III light helicopter

=== Aircraft ===
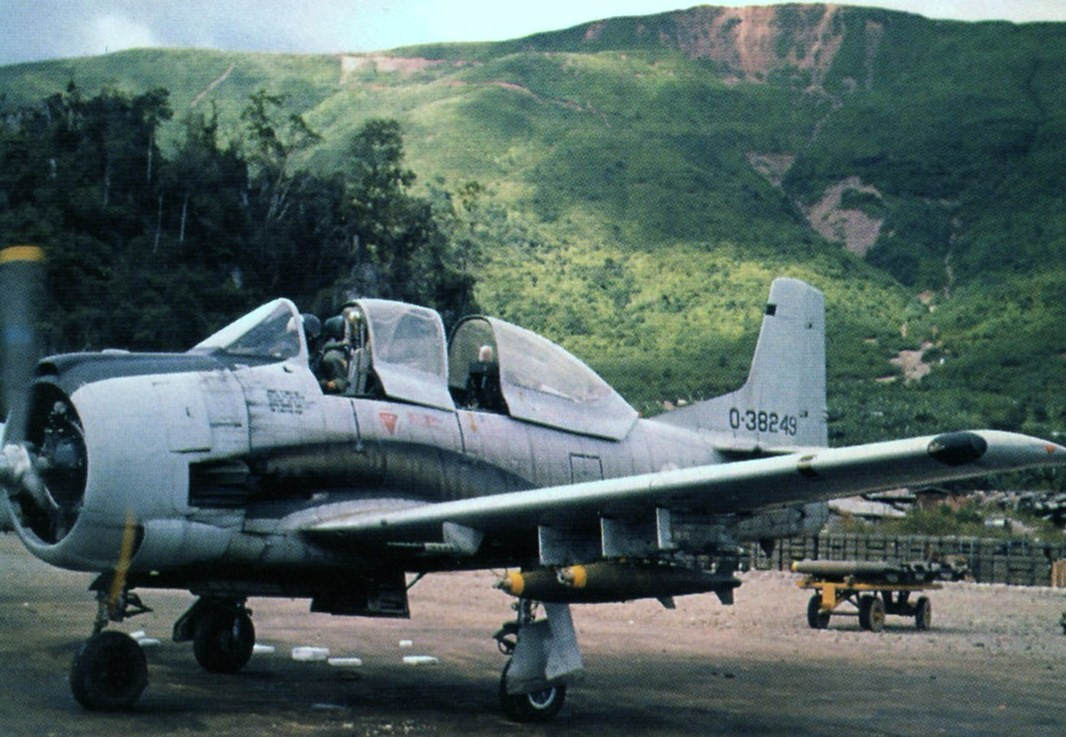
A Royal Lao Air Force (RLAF) T-28D Nomad armed trainer taxies at Long Tieng airfield, September 1972

- Cessna T-41B/D Mescalero trainer
- North American T-6G Texan trainer/fighter-bomber
- North American RT-28B Trojan trainer
- North American T-28D Trojan fighter-bomber
- AC-47D Spooky gunship
- De Havilland Canada DHC U-6 (L-20) Beaver STOL utility transport
- De Havilland DH.104 Dove short-haul airliner
- Aero Commander 560 utility transport
- Antonov An-2 Colt utility aircraft: Provided to the FAN by the Soviet Union.
- Douglas C-47D Skytrain transport
- Lisunov Li-2 utility transport: Provided to the FAN by the Soviet Union.
- Curtiss C-46F Commando transport
- Fairchild C-123K Provider transport
- Morane-Saulnier MS 500 Criquet liaison aircraft
- U-17A/B light utility aircraft
- Cessna L-19A/O-1F Bird Dog reconnaissance/observation light aircraft
- EC-47D SIGINT aircraft

=== River craft ===
- Wizard-class river gunboat (a.k.a. Privat)
- Cabin-type patrol boat
- Chris-Craft patrol boat
- FOM 11 patrol and escort boat
- FOM 8 patrol and escort boat
- Landing Craft Vehicle Personnel (LCVP)
- Landing Craft Mechanized Mk 6 Mod 1-LCM (6) Landing Craft Utility (LCU)
- 21-foot shallow-draft boat, powered by a 50-horsepower outboard engine
- 26-foot river boat, powered by a long-shaft motor

== Pathet Lao LPLA equipment ==
=== Pistols ===
- Tokarev TT-33
- Type 54 pistol: Chinese copy of the TT-33.
- Type 59 pistol: Chinese copy of the Makarov PM.
- Walther P38: Captured.
- Colt.45 M1911A1: Captured.

=== Submachine guns ===
- MAS-38: Captured.
- MAT-49: Captured.
- M1A1 Thompson: Captured.
- PPSh-41
- PPS-43
- K-50M

=== Carbines ===
- MAS-49/56 carbine: Captured.
- M1 Carbine: all variants captured.
- M1A1 paratrooper carbine
- M2 Carbine

=== Bolt-action rifles ===
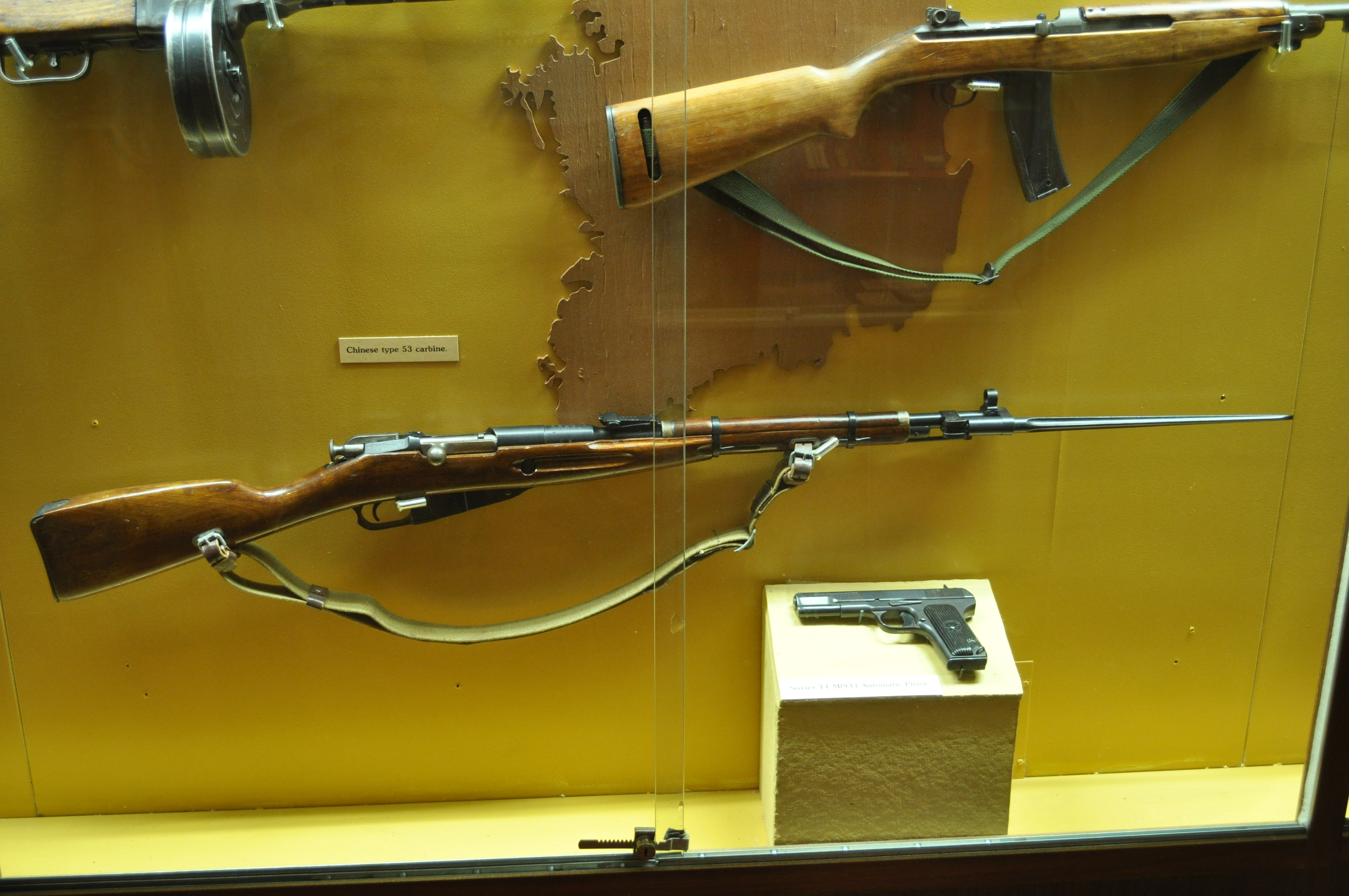
Chinese Type 53 carbine.

- Mosin–Nagant: Received from the Soviet Union and North Vietnam.
- Type 53 Carbine: Received from China and North Vietnam.
- MAS-36: Captured.
- MAS-36 CR39 folding-stock paratrooper rifle: Captured.
- Arisaka: Limited quantities handed down from North Vietnam.
- M1903 Springfield: Captured from the French during the First Indochina War or handed down by North Vietnam.
- US M1917: Captured from the French during the First Indochina War or received from the Viet Minh.
- Mauser Kar98k: Mauser rifles received from the Soviet Union handed down by North Vietnam.
- Type 24/79 rifle: Chinese Mauser rifles received from China handed down by North Vietnam.
- Vz. 24 rifle: Czech Mauser rifles received from Czechoslovakia handed down by North Vietnam.

=== Sniper rifles ===
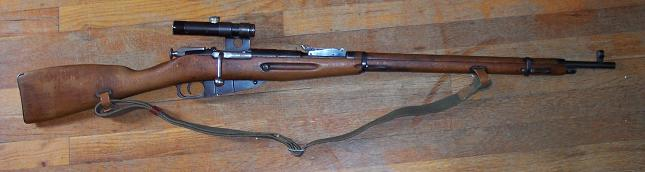
Hungarian M/52 sniper rifle with PU 3.5× optics.

- M/52
- Dragunov SVD-63: limited use by the PAVN.

=== Battle rifles ===
- SKS semi-automatic rifle
- Type 56 semi-automatic rifle: Chinese copy of the SKS.
- vz. 52 rifle
- vz. 58
- AK-47
- AKS
- AKM
- AKMS
- Type 56 assault rifle: Chinese variant of the AK-47.
- Type 56-1: Chinese variant of the AKS.
- MAS-49 semi-automatic rifle: Captured.
- M1 Garand semi-automatic rifle: Captured.
- M16A1 Assault rifle: Captured.

=== Light machine guns ===
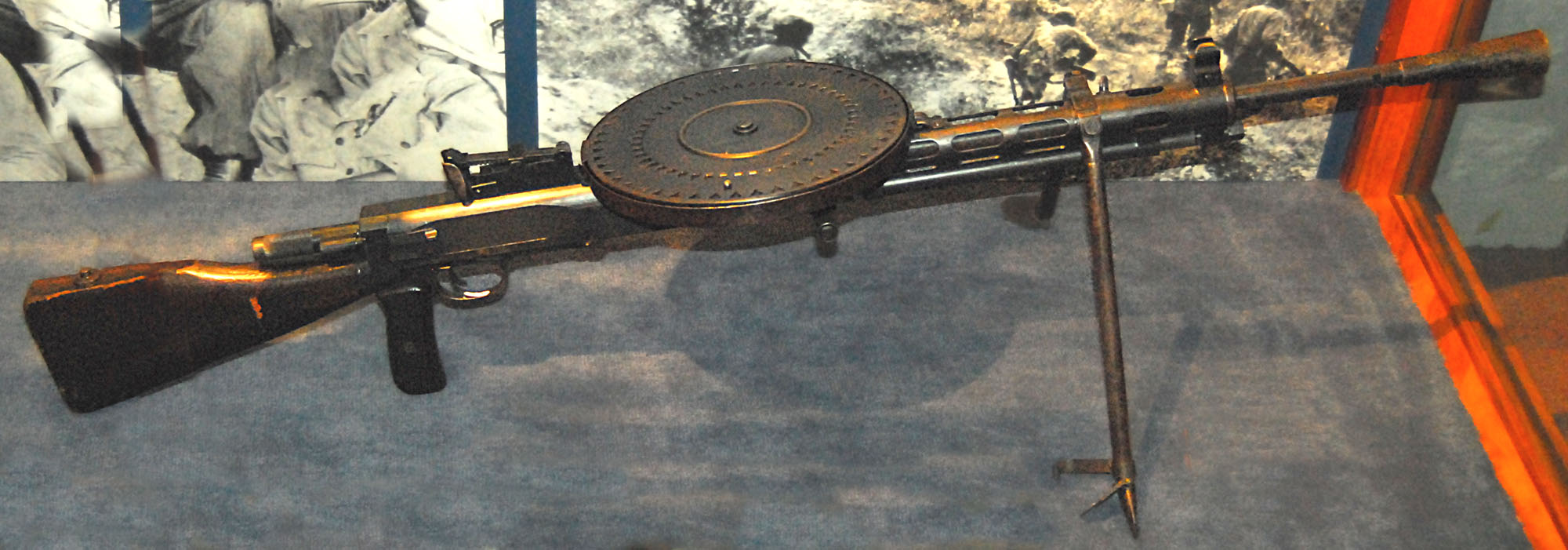
Degtyaryov DP/DPM light machine gun (Chinese Type 53)

- Degtyaryov DP/DPM
- Type 53: Chinese copy of the Degtyaryov DP/DPM.
- RPK
- Type 26: Chinese copy of the Czechoslovak ZB vz. 26.
- Bren: Captured.
- FM 24/29: Captured.
- M1918A2 BAR: Captured.

=== General-purpose machine guns ===
- Degtyaryov RP-46
- RPD
- Type 56 machine gun: Chinese copy of the RPD.
- PK/PKM

=== Medium and heavy machine guns ===
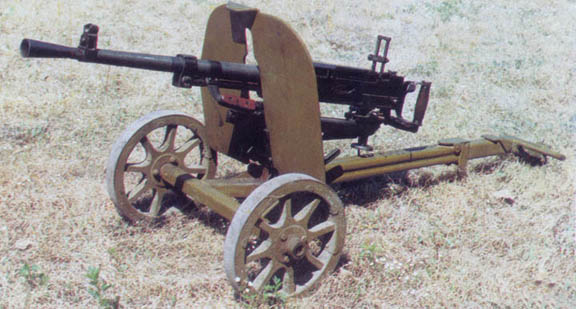
SG-43/SGM Goryunov machine gun (Chinese Type 53/57)

- MAC-31A2 7.65mm: Captured.
- SG-43/SGM Goryunov
- Type 53/57: Chinese variant of the SG-43/SGM.
- DShKM
- Type 54: Chinese variant of the DShKM.
- KPV
- Browning M1919A4: Captured.
- Browning M2HB .50 Cal: Captured.

=== Grenade systems ===
- F1/M33 hand grenade
- RG-4 anti-personnel grenade
- RGD-33 hand grenade
- RG-42 hand grenade
- RGD-5 hand grenade
- RPG-43 anti-tank grenade
- Type 1/M33 hand grenade
- Type 42 hand grenade
- Type 59 hand grenade
- Type 67 stick grenade

=== Land mine systems ===
- POMZ-2 anti-personnel mine
- Type 2M anti-personnel mine
- PMD-6/7 anti-personnel mine
- PP-Mi-Sr anti-personnel mine
- TMD-B anti-personnel mine
- TM-41 anti-tank mine
- TMB-2 anti-tank mine
- TM-46/TMN-46 anti-tank mine

=== Rocket systems ===
- DKB Grad-P 122 mm Light portable rocket system: used by the PAVN.
- BM-14 140 mm multiple launch rocket system (MLRS): mounted on ZIS-151 trucks.

=== Anti-tank rocket launchers ===
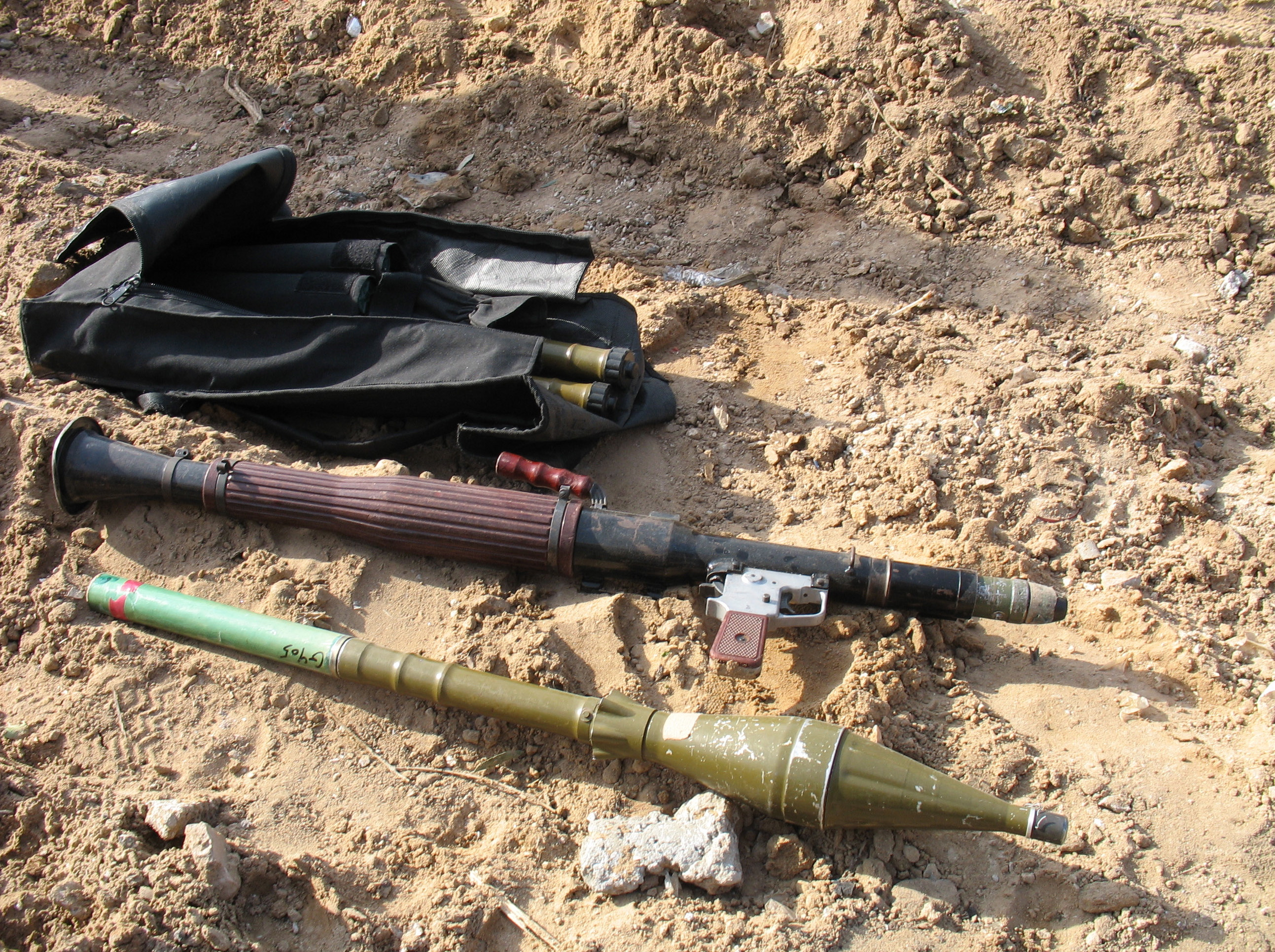
Type 69 RPG

- RPG-2: B40 Rocket
- RPG-7: B41 Rocket
- Type 56 RPG
- Type 69 RPG

=== Grenade launchers ===
- M79: Captured.

=== Recoilless rifles ===
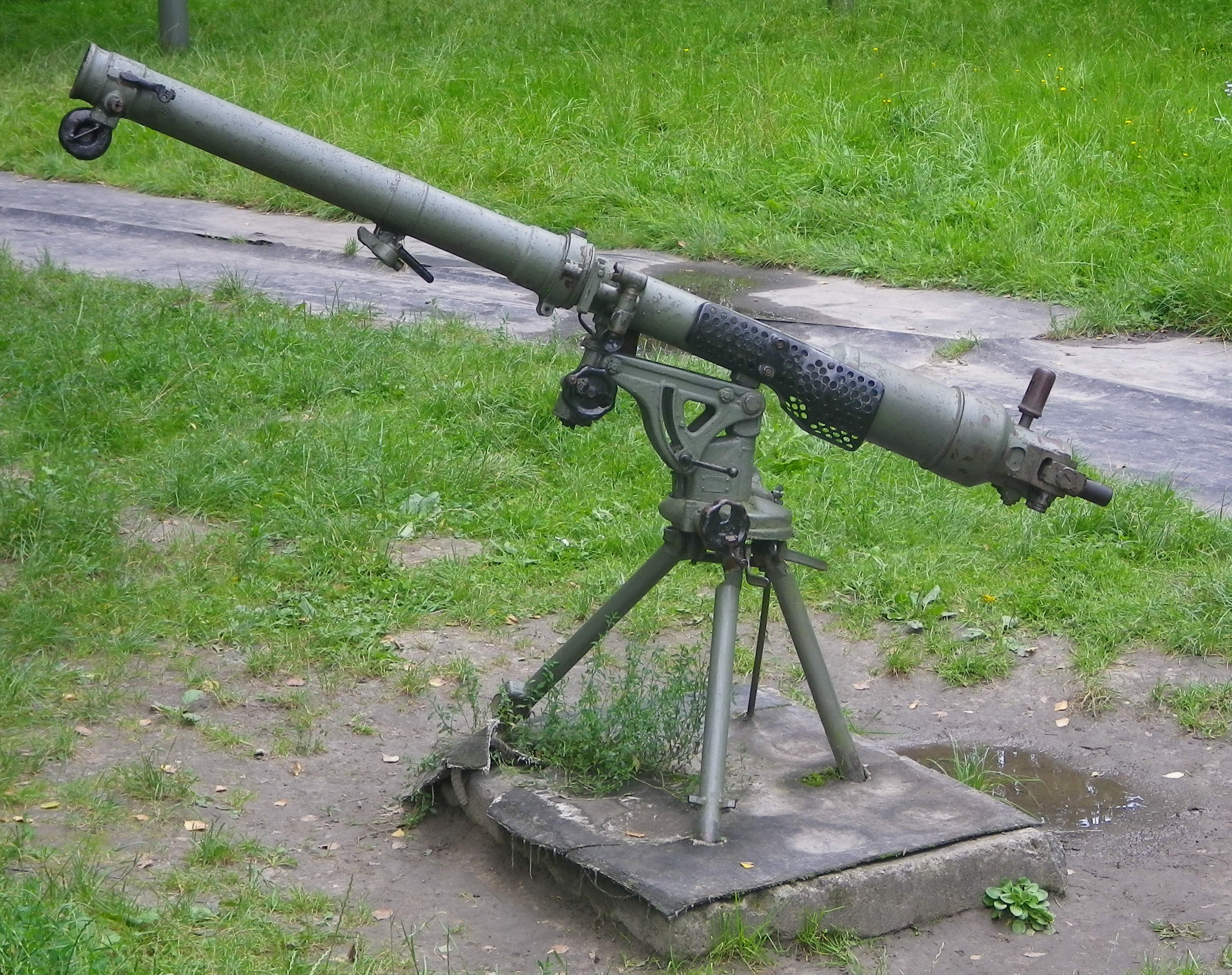
B-10 recoilless rifle

- M18A1 57 mm: Captured.
- B-10 82 mm
- B-11 107 mm
- Type 56 75 mm
- Type 65 75 mm

=== Mortars ===
- Brandt Mle 1935 60 mm mortar: Captured.
- Brandt Mle 27/31 81 mm mortar: Captured.
- Type 53 82 mm mortar
- PM-41 82 mm mortar
- M1938 107 mm mortar
- Type 55 120 mm mortar

=== Howitzers ===
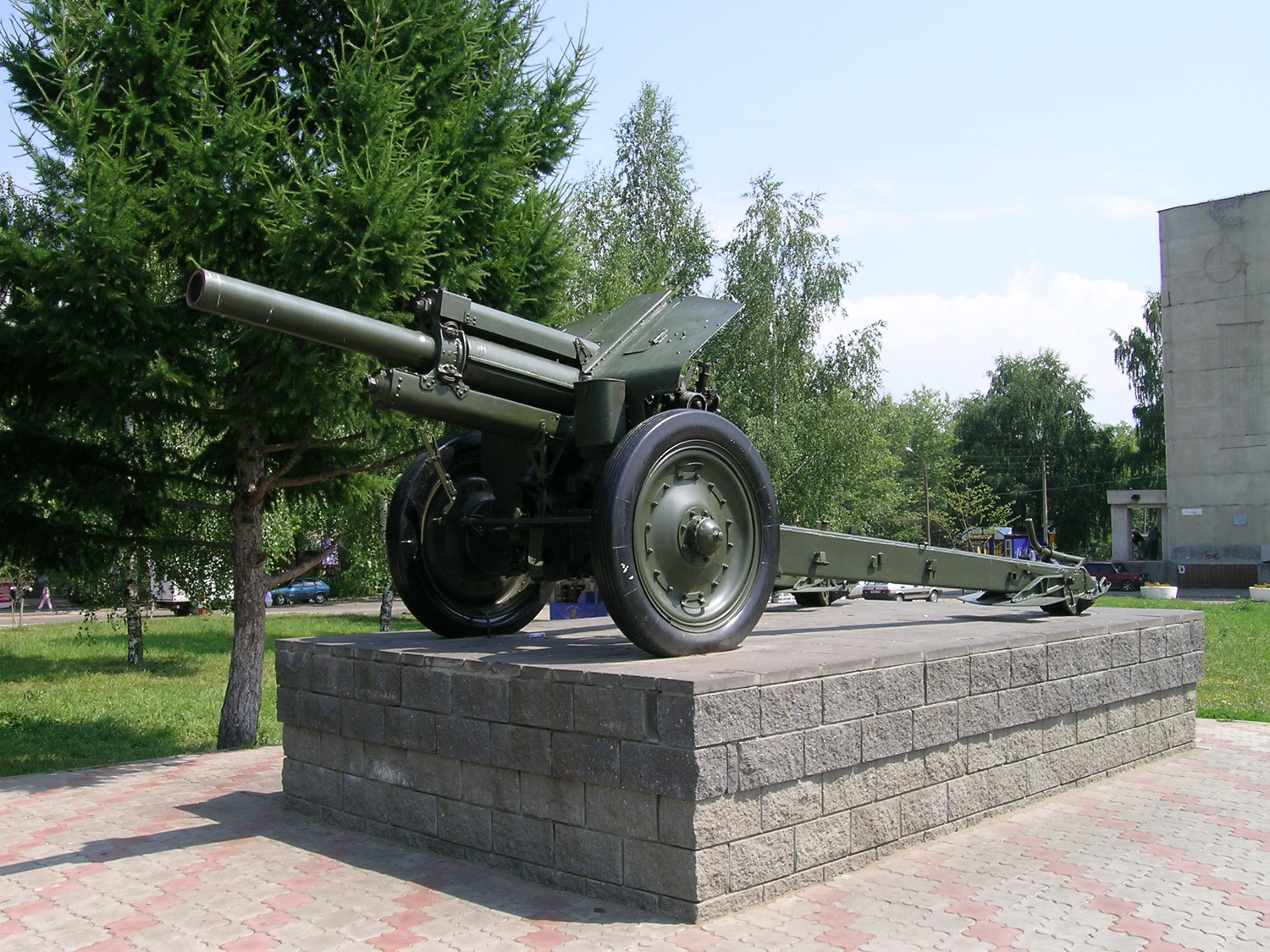
M-30 122 mm towed howitzer (M1938)

- M-30 122 mm towed howitzer (M1938)
- 2A18 (D-30) 122 mm towed howitzer
- M-46 130 mm towed field gun (M1954)
- M101A1 105 mm towed field howitzer: Captured from the French; used by the PAVN earlier in the War.

=== Air defense guns ===
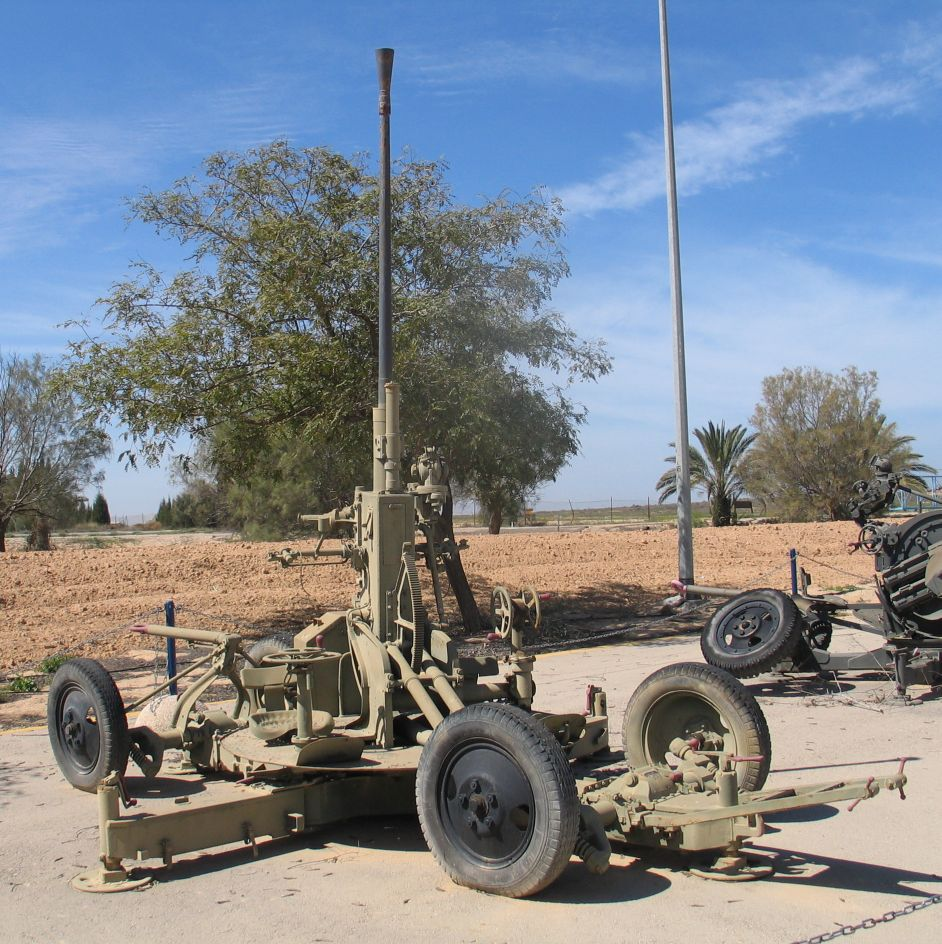
37 mm automatic air defence gun M1939 (61-K)

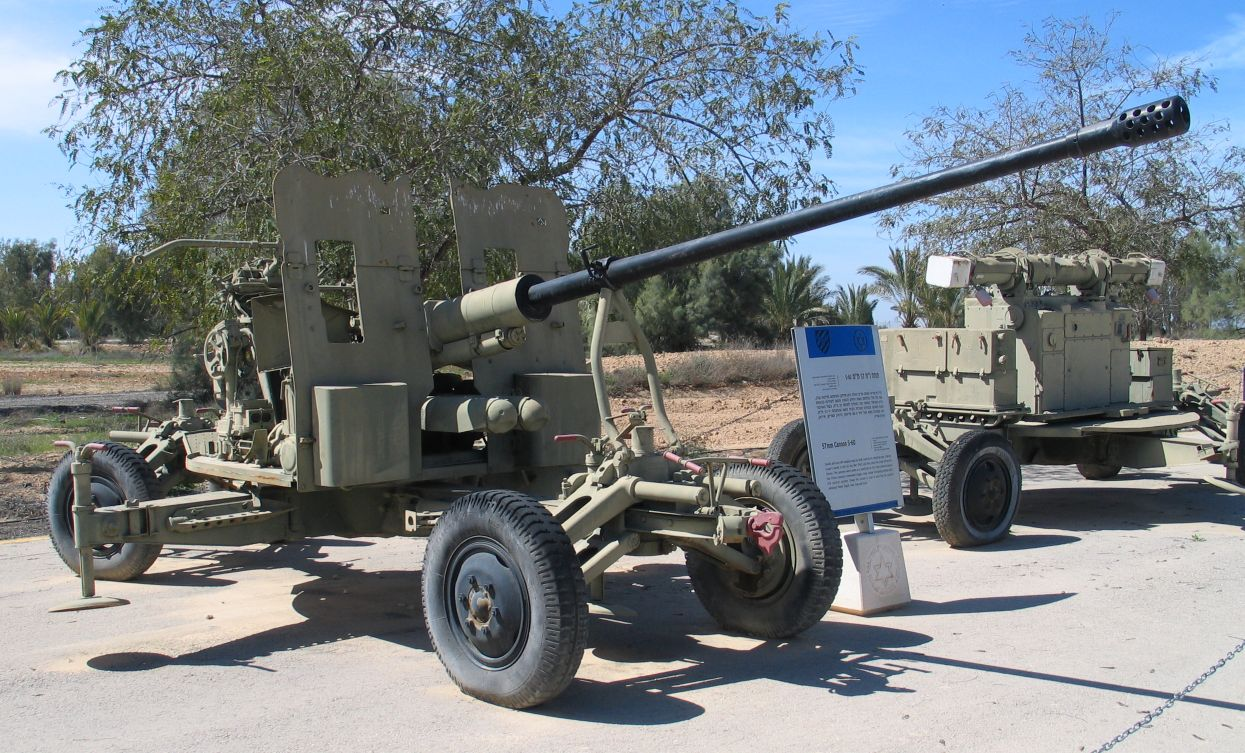
57 mm AZP S-60 air defense gun

- Flak 30 20 mm single-barrelled AA autocannon: used by the PAVN.
- ZPU-1 14.5 mm single-barrelled AA autocannon
- ZPU-2 14.5 mm double-barrelled AA autocannon
- ZPU-4 14.5 mm quadruple-barrelled AA autocannon
- Vz.53 12.7 mm quadruple-barrelled AA gun
- ZU-23-2 23 mm twin automatic anti-aircraft gun: used by the PAVN.
- M1939 (61-K) 37 mm air defense gun
- AZP S-60 57 mm air defense gun

=== Vehicles ===
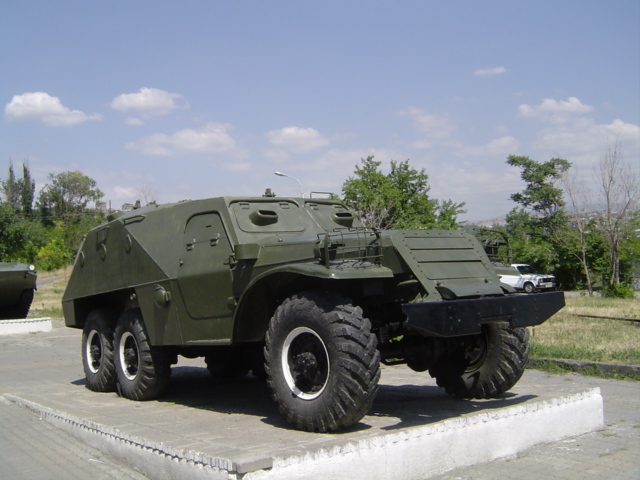
BTR-152 APC

- PT-76 amphibious light tank
- T-34/85 medium tank
- Type 62 light tank
- T-54/55 main battle tank
- BRDM-2 Amphibious Armoured Scout Car
- BTR-40 armored personnel carrier
- BTR-152 armored personnel carrier
- BJ-212 (4×4) light utility vehicle
- GAZ-69A (4×4) field car
- GAZ-51 (4×2) 2½-ton cargo truck
- GAZ-63 (4×4) 2-ton cargo truck
- Yuejin NJ-130 2.5 ton cargo truck
- ZIL-130 medium-weight general-purpose truck
- ZIS-150 2½-ton (4×2) general-purpose truck
- ZIS-151 2½-ton (6×6) general-purpose truck
- ZIL-157 2½-ton (6×6) general-purpose truck
- Jiefang CA-30 general purpose 2.5 ton (6×6) truck
- M35A2 2½-ton (6×6) cargo truck: Captured.

=== Helicopters ===
- Mil Mi-4 Hound transport

=== Aircraft ===
- Polikarpov Po-2 utility biplane/trainer
- Antonov An-2 Colt utility aircraft
- Lisunov Li-2 utility transport
- Ilyushin Il-12 transport
- Yakovlev Yak-40 Regional jet

=== River craft ===
- Dugout canoe
- River Sampan

== See also ==
- Cambodian Civil War
- First Indochina War
- Laotian Civil War
- List of weapons of the Vietnam War
- List of weapons of the Cambodian Civil War
- Military Regions of Laos
- Vietnam War
- List of weapons of the First Indochina War
