= American Club Taipei =

- 臺北市美僑協會
- Type: Private
- Location: 47 Bei-an Road, Taipei, Taiwan
- Key people: Maria Ting (President); Frank Chen (Vice President); Peter Wood (General Manager)
- Website: www.americanclub.org.tw

The American Club Taipei (Chinese: 臺北市美僑協會; pinyin: Táiběi shì měi qiáo xiéhuì), formerly known as the American Club in China ("ACC"), is a private member-owned club that serves the international community in the Greater Taipei area. The ACC is located in Zhongshan District, Taipei.

== History ==
The coat of arms of MAAG R.O.C. (Taiwan)

Founded in 1968, the ACC is located on the premises of what was the MAAG NCO Open Mess - Club 63, a US enlisted personnel club for MAAG NCOs established in 1957. In the mid-1970s Club 63 was transferred to the U.S. Navy and renamed as the China Seas Club. With the withdrawal of the U.S. military from the island, the China Seas Club ceased operation and was re-purposed as a private club for the U.S. expatriate business community in Taipei, becoming the ACC.

== Membership & Benefits ==
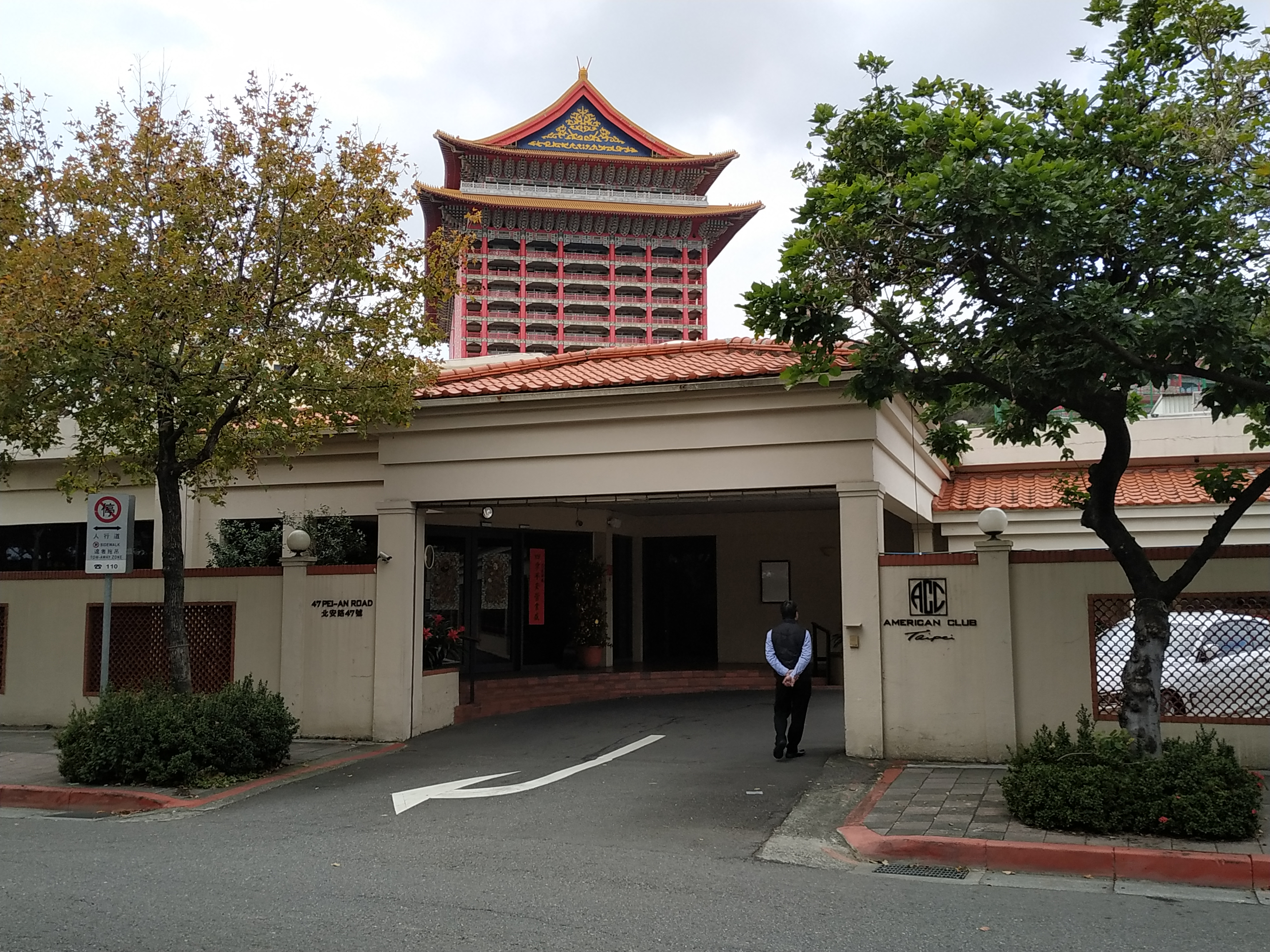
Entrance of the ACC with the Grand Hotel in the background.

Despite its name, ACC membership is open to people of all nationalities. The club’s current membership includes people from over 40 countries. The majority of its members however are U.S. and Taiwanese (R.O.C) citizens.

All ACC members enjoy full use of the club's facilities, including a swimming pool, fitness center, squash and tennis courts, nursery, library, and hair salon. The ACC also features a number of restaurants, including the Terrace (Coffee shop), Sigis (Italian), Gyoson (Japanese) and Rendezvous (Sports bar). The ACC has reciprocal agreements with over 80 clubs from around the world.

== See also ==
- Former American Club in Shanghai
- American Club Beijing
- American Club Shanghai
- American Club Hong Kong
- Tokyo American Club
- American Club Singapore
- Taipei American School
- American Institute in Taiwan (AIT)
