= Military Assistance Advisory Group =

US military advisors sent to other countries to help train their armed forces

A Military Assistance Advisory Group (MAAG) is a designation for a group of military advisors from the United States sent to other countries to assist in the training of conventional armed forces and facilitate military aid. Although numerous MAAGs operated around the world throughout the 1940s–1970s, including in Yugoslavia after 1951, and to the Ethiopian Armed Forces, the most famous MAAGs were those active in South Vietnam, Cambodia, Laos, and Thailand, before and during the Vietnam War.

Records held by the National Archives and Records Administration detail the activities of numerous assistance advisory groups. In the NATO countries, MAAGs and similar bodies included JAMAG Europe; MAAG Belgium-Luxembourg; MAAG Denmark; MAAG France; MAAGs in Italy; the Netherlands; Norway; and Portugal, and the MAAG United Kingdom (1949-57); and military assistance units in Greece (from 1947); Turkey (from 1947); and Spain (from 1953). MAAGs and military assistance bodies beyond NATO were located in countries including Brazil; Cambodia; the Republic of China (see below); Ethiopia; Indonesia; Iran, until 1979; Japan; the U.S. Military Advisory Group to the Republic of Korea (KMAG); Laos (see below); Libya; the Joint U.S. Military Advisory Group to the Republic of the Philippines; the Joint U.S. Military Advisory Group, Thailand (see below); the U.S. Air Force Mission to Uruguay; and the American Military Assistance Staff, Yugoslavia.

Typically, the personnel of MAAGs were considered to be technical staff attached to, and enjoying the privileges of, the US diplomatic mission in a country. "The special status of personnel serving in Military Advisory Assistance Groups (MAAG) results from their position as an integral part of the Embassy of the United States where they perform duty." Although the term is not as widespread as it once was, the functions performed by MAAGs continue to be performed by successor organizations attached to embassies, often called United States Military Groups (USMILGP or MILGRP). The term MAAG may still occasionally be used for U.S. DOD organizations helping promote military partnerships with several Latin American countries such as Peru and the Dominican Republic.

== Military assistance bodies in NATO countries ==
In the NATO countries, MAAGs and similar bodies included JAMAG Europe; MAAG Belgium-Luxembourg; MAAG Denmark; MAAG France (at least 1949-54); MAAGs in Italy; the Netherlands; Norway; and Portugal, and the MAAG United Kingdom (1949-57); and military assistance units in Greece (from 1947); Turkey (from 1947); and Spain (from 1953).

=== MAAG, Greece ===
In 1983, Joint MAAG in Greece US Navy Captain George Tsantes was killed by Revolutionary Organization 17 November.

=== Spain ===
MAAG Spain and the Joint U.S. Military Group (JUSMG) Spain were established by memorandum of Acting Secretary of Defense to Secretary of the Air Force, September 2, 1953, implementing two defense agreements and an economic agreement between United States and Spain, all concluded September 26, 1953. The establishment of MAAG Spain and JUSMG Spain, effective November 1, 1953, was confirmed by General Order 43, Department of the Air Force, November 6, 1953, with MAAG Spain responsible for administering mutual defense assistance program and JUSMG Spain responsible for constructing bases for U.S. use.

== Military assistance bodies beyond NATO ==
Beyond NATO military assistance groups were located in countries including Brazil (established June 1953); Cambodia; the Republic of China (see below); Ethiopia; Indonesia; Iran, until 1979; Japan; the U.S. Military Advisory Group to the Republic of Korea (KMAG); Laos (see below); Libya; Pakistan; the Joint U.S. Military Advisory Group to the Republic of the Philippines; the Joint U.S. Military Advisory Group, Thailand (see below); the U.S. Air Force Mission to Uruguay; and the American Military Assistance Staff, Yugoslavia.

=== Brazil ===
U.S. military assistance to Brazil began during World War II.

Major General William A. Beiderlinden served in Brazil from 1952 to 1955, holding the positions of head of the Joint Brazil-United States Military Commission and Military Assistance Advisory Group Brazil. He was commended for his work to improve U.S-Brazil military relations, and his success was recognized when Brazil's military awarded him honorary graduate status of that country's Escola Superior de Guerra. He returned to the United States in April 1955 and retired in June.

=== MAAG Cambodia ===
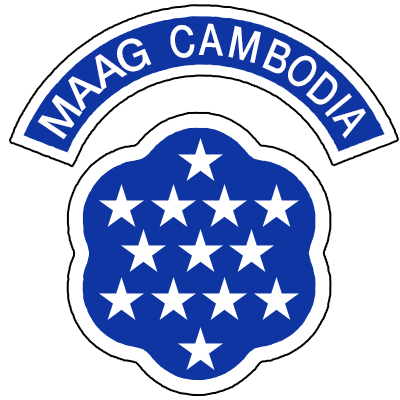
MAAG CAMBODIA INSIGNIA

MAAG Cambodia was established on June 4, 1955, pursuant to the United States-Royal Government of Cambodia agreement of May 16, 1955. This agreement included the introduction of high-ranking US military personnel to advise the Cambodian armed forces as non-combatants. The advisory group was staffed mainly by army personnel, with smaller contingents of navy and air force personnel.

As Cambodia's leadership took an official policy of neutrality in the Cold War, MAAG Cambodia's involvement in the country was terminated on November 20, 1963, by General Order 6, MAAG Cambodia, following the Cambodian government's cancellation of all U.S. aid.

=== Republic of China / Taiwan ===
Badge of MAAG ROC in Taiwan

At the end of World War II, a Col. Wise recruited for the Military Advisory Group to the Republic of China Air Force with headquarters located at Nanking and liaison teams at Hankou.

From 1951 until 1978, there was a Military Assistance Advisory Group to the Republic of China in Taiwan. From 1955, operational U.S. joint combat forces operating alongside the advisory group were directed by the United States Taiwan Defense Command.

The Military Assistance Advisory Group, Taiwan, commanded by Army Major General William C. Chase, was authorized 67 Army, 4 Navy and 63 Air Force personnel. Under the group's joint headquarters were Army, Navy and Air Force sections. General Chase arrived at Taipei, Taiwan, on 1 May 1951 to begin carrying out his duties as the military member of a team, which was charged with insuring that all assistance granted the Chinese Nationalists was in furtherance of United States foreign policy.

After its arrival at Taiwan, the advisory group was reorganized and expanded. Initially there was no representation from the Marine Corps, until a U.S. Marine officer, Robert B. Carney Jr., was added to the team. Later on he was joined by a dozen other officers and enlisted men, bringing up the total to 13 Marine Corps personnel. The original three Service sections proved inadequate, so a joint technical service section was created as a counterpart to, and for advising, the Nationalist Army's Combined Service Force, which comprised the medical, signal, engineer, ordnance, transportation, chemical, and quartermaster services. A Headquarters Commandant, on the same level as the four section chiefs, was made responsible for the routine tasks necessary to support the group. Military Assistance Advisory Group officers assisted their counterparts within the Nationalist Ministry of National Defense and the general headquarters. Special teams were created as needed to provide aid at service schools and in tactical units.

On September 3, 1954, fourteen 120mm and 155mm Chinese Communist artillery in Xiamen (Amoy) and Dadeng (Tateng) fired six thousand rounds at the Kinmen (Quemoy) Islands in a five-hour period. Two Americans of the US Military Assistance Advisory Group, Lieutenant Colonel Alfred Medendorp and Lieutenant Colonel Frank Lynn, were killed in the shelling. Memorial cenotaphs were erected for the officers on Greater Kinmen by the ROC Army Kinmen Defense Command in 1992 and 2011 respectively. Lt. Col. Alfred Medendorp (孟登道中校) was posthumously awarded the Order of the Cloud and Banner in November 1954.

General Chase retired in 1955 at which time he was succeeded by U.S. Brigadier General Lester Bork. In 1967, Major General Richard Ciccolella commanded the MAAG. By this time, the CINCPAC Command History for 1967 gives the title as "MAAG China".

American military advisors were tasked with providing arms and military advice, assisting with Taiwanese military training, implementation of the Sino-American Mutual Defense Treaty, maintaining military contacts, and monitoring Republic of China forces. In 1957 there were 10,000 Americans in Taiwan, the great majority being CIA and military personnel and their families.

Since 1979, the site of MAAG headquarters in Taipei has been occupied by American Institute in Taiwan/Taipei Main Office, which moved to a new office complex in 2019. The American Club Taipei currently occupies the former site of the MAAG NCO Open Mess – Club 63.

=== MAAG Laos ===
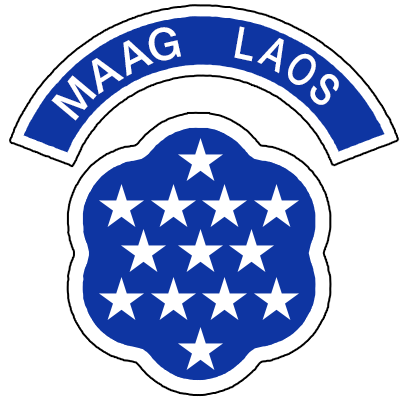
MAAG LAOS INSIGNIA

MAAG Laos was preceded by the Programs Evaluation Office, established on 15 December 1955. Due to the limitations emplaced by international treaty, the PEO was set up with civilian personnel instead of a MAAG with military staff. When political changes superseded the treaty, MAAG Laos was established in 1961 to replace the Programs Evaluation Office in its support of the Royal Lao Army's fight against the communist Pathet Lao. On July 23, 1962, several interested countries agreed in Geneva to guarantee the neutrality and independence of Laos. As such, the US removed the MAAG, replacing it with a Requirements Office, which served as a convenient cover for the CIA activities.

One of MAAG Laos' commanders was Reuben Tucker.

=== Military Mission in Liberia ===
Upon the request of the Liberian Government, President Harry S. Truman approved on October 19, 1950 a small US military training mission for Liberia. The mission (abbreviated LIBMISH) was to "undertake to reorganize and train the ..poorly organized and ill-equipped Liberian militia for internal security." In the event, the U.S. Army personnel of the mission remained, training the Armed Forces of Liberia, until the 1990s and the First Liberian Civil War.

=== MAAG Iran ===
In 1943, a U.S. Army Mission (ARMISH) to the Imperial Iranian Armed Forces was established.

Major General Clarence S. Ridley, the first commander, "..found upon his arrival that the inflation had rendered officer salaries, and the budget generally, inadequate; that of serious equipment shortages, those in transport were drastic; that the organization and functioning of the supply and auxiliary departments were unsatisfactory; but that for all tasks likely to be imposed upon the Army during the war period, 1942 tactical methods and training were in general sufficient. In a report submitted in 1942, at the request of the Shah, to the Minister of War, Ridley specified four necessities as basic to Army reorganisation: limiting total strength to 88,000; retaining only the best officers; providing a reasonable scale of pay; and providing adequate motor transport."

In October 1946 the U.S. Ambassador wrote that the: "Iranians have formed great expectations of US Army mission under Grow and are already talking about request that it be doubled in size and giving it more responsibility."

In October 1947 the U.S. Army Mission under General Robert W. Grow succeeded Ridley's limited mission. They were to "advise and assist the Minister of War of Iran ..with respect to plans, problems concerning organisation, administrative principles and training methods. The mission was to be involved with the General Staff and all the departments of the Ministry of War in Tehran except as regarding "tactical and strategic plans and operations against a foreign enemy." In 1949 after the creation of the Department of Defense, the words "United States Air Force" were added to mentions of the United States Army in a revised wording of the agreement.

The Military Assistance and Advisory Group (MAAG) was established in 1950, and this began United States Navy involvement. The Imperial Iranian Armed Forces began to adopt American military structures and doctrines. The separate organizations were consolidated in 1958. From 1962 to 1978 the two advisory missions were referred to as ARMISH-MAAG. In 1969, a Technical Assistance Field Team (TAFT) was added. About one quarter of the approximately 100 U. S. Navy advisors in 1978 were MAAG, acting as a headquarters advisory component, and the remainder are TAFT, acting as one-on-one field advisors with an IIN counterpart. All advisors were chief petty officers or above.

By July 1972, Henry Kissinger wrote "we should leave decisions on what [military equipment] to buy to the Government of Iran and confine ourselves to assuring that the Iranian Government has good technical advice from our military people on the capabilities of the equipment involved." See Saunders to Kissinger, 14 July 1972, in FRUS, 212.

Richard Secord was the USAF Chief of the Military Assistance Advisory Group (MAAG) in Iran from September 1975 to July 1978. The new posting mandated a promotion to brigadier general. In his new capacity he managed all USAF military assistance programs in Iran as well as some US Navy and Army programs, and acted as chief adviser to the Commander-in-Chief of the Imperial Iranian Air Force. Secord claims that despite endemic corruption in Iran, his MAAG was able to rebate to the Iranian government about $50 million from the Grumman Corporation. During this time he also oversaw Project Dark Gene and Project Ibex. After William H. Sullivan was appointed ambassador, Secord again found himself clashing with the diplomat over the use of U. S. military personnel and civilian technicians.

An Air Force major-general was in command of the mission in 1978.

=== Philippines ===
By 1987, Colonel James N. Rowe was assigned as the chief of the Army division of the Joint U.S. Military Advisory Group (JUSMAG), providing counterinsurgency training for the Armed Forces of the Philippines. Working closely with the Central Intelligence Agency and intelligence organizations of the Republic of the Philippines, he was involved in its nearly decade-long program to penetrate the New People's Army (NPA), the communist insurgency that threatened to overthrow the Philippines' government.

=== MAAG Thailand ===
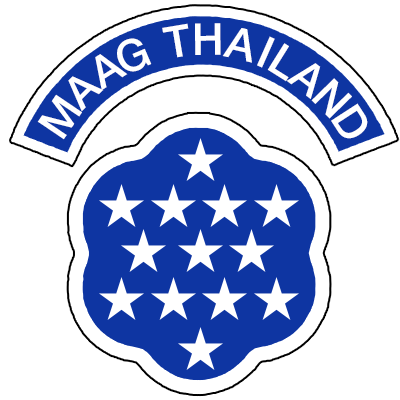
MAAG THAILAND INSIGNIA

As part of the military outreach of the USA to friendly countries in Southeast Asia, a MAAG was established in Bangkok, Thailand in September 1950 with Brigadier general John T. Cole as Group Chief. It was replaced by the Joint United States Military Advisory Group Thailand in September 1953, which still operates today.

=== Vietnam ===
In September 1950, US President Harry Truman sent the Military Assistance Advisory Group to Indochina to assist the French Union in the First Indochina War. The President claimed they were not sent as combat troops, but to supervise the use of $10 million worth of US military equipment to support the French in their effort to fight the communist-led Viet Minh forces. By 1953, aid increased dramatically to $350 million to replace old military equipment owned by the French.

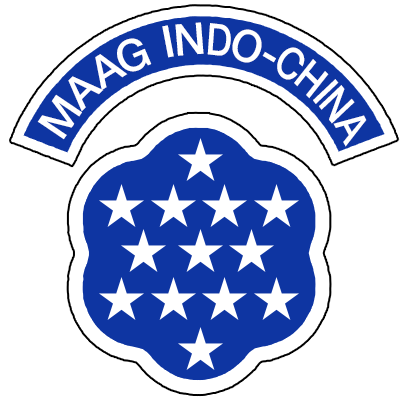
MAAG INDO-CHINA INSIGNIA

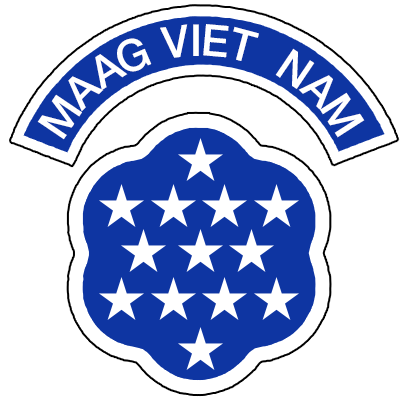
MAAG VIETNAM INSIGNIA

Although the State of Vietnam was then nominally independent, it was still partly constrained as an associated state within the French Union. The French Army was reluctant to take U.S. advice and would not allow the Vietnamese National Army to be trained to use the new equipment. The French forces were supposed to not only defeat enemy forces but to solidify themselves as a colonial power, which they could not do if a Vietnamese army existed. French commanders were so reluctant to accept advice that would weaken the time-honored colonial role that they got in the way of the various attempts by the MAAG to observe where the equipment was being sent and how it was being used. Eventually, the French decided to cooperate, but at that point, it was too late. By 1954, the United States had spent $1 billion in support of the French military effort, shouldering 80 percent of the cost of the war.

In 1954 the commanding general of French Union forces in Indochina, General Henri Navarre, allowed the United States to send liaison officers to Vietnamese forces. But it was too late, because of the siege and fall of Dien Bien Phu in the spring. On 4 June 1954, Vietnam gained full autonomy within the French Union. As stated by the Geneva Accords a month later, France and its Vietnamese ally were forced to give up the northern half of Vietnam. The French army later withdrew from South Vietnam by April 1956.

On 13 December, leader of French army in Indochina Paul Ély and US Ambassador to South Vietnam J. Lawton Collins reached an "understanding on development and training of autonomous Viet-Nam forces." Under the agreement, Military Assistance Advisory Group would assume full responsibility for organizing and training the South Vietnamese military while still recognizing the overall French military authority. The French were to grant "full autonomy" to the South Vietnamese armed forces by 1 July 1955. The Americans and French did not consult with the Vietnamese while setting up the agreement.

At a conference in Washington, D.C., on February 12, 1955, between officials of the U.S. State Department and the French Minister of Overseas Affairs, it was agreed that all U.S. military aid would be funneled directly to South Vietnam and that all major military responsibilities would be transferred from the French to the MAAG under the command of Lieutenant General John O'Daniel. MAAG Indochina was renamed the MAAG Vietnam on November 1, 1955, as the United States became more deeply involved in what would come to be known as the Vietnam War.

The next few years saw the rise of a Communist insurgency in South Vietnam, and President Diem looked increasingly to US military assistance to strengthen his position, albeit with certain reservations. Attacks on US military advisors in Vietnam became more frequent. On October 22, 1957, MAAG Vietnam and USIS installations in Saigon were bombed, injuring US military advisors. In the summer of 1959, Communist guerrillas staged an attack on a Vietnamese military base in Bien Hoa, killing and wounding several MAAG personnel. During this time, American advisors were not put in high-ranking positions, and President Diem was reluctant to allow American advisors into Vietnamese tactical units. He was afraid that the United States would gain control or influence over his forces if Americans got into the ranks of the army. The first signs that his position was beginning to shift came in 1960, when the number of official US military advisors in the country was increased from 327 to 685 at the request of the South Vietnamese government. By 1961, communist guerrillas were becoming stronger and more active. This increased enemy contacts in size and intensity throughout South Vietnam. At this point, Diem was under pressure from US authorities to liberalize his regime and implement reforms. Although key elements in the US administration were resisting his requests for increased military funding and Army of the Republic of Vietnam (ARVN) troop ceilings, MAAG Vietnam played a significant role in advocating for a greater US presence in the country. Throughout this period relations between the MAAG Vietnam and Diem were described as "excellent", even though the advisors were doubtful of his ability to hold off the insurgency.

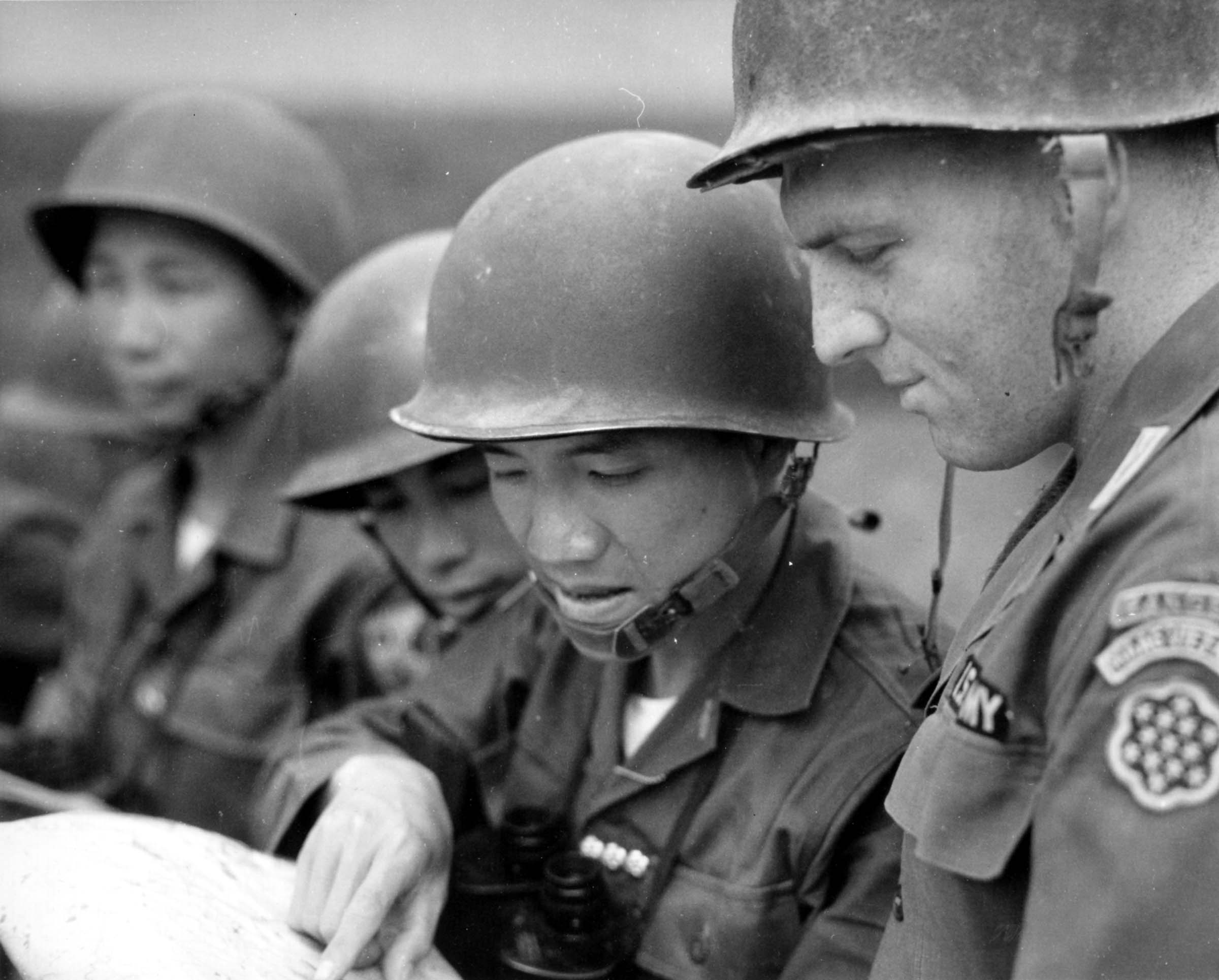
U.S. Army advisor trains at battalion level

Newly elected President John F. Kennedy agreed with MAAG Vietnam's calls for increases in ARVN troop levels and the U.S. military commitment in both equipment and men. In response, Kennedy provided $28.4 million in funding for ARVN, and overall military aid increased from $50 million per year to $144 million in 1961. In the first year of the Kennedy administration, MAAG Vietnam worked closely with administration officials, the United States Operations Mission, and the US Information Service to develop a counterinsurgency plan (CIP). The CIP's main initiatives included the strengthening of ARVN to combat the Communist insurgency, which had the corollary effect of strengthening Diem's political position. At the same time President Diem agreed to the assignment of advisors to battalion level, significantly increasing the number of advisors; from 746 in 1961 to over 3,400 before MAAG Vietnam was placed under the Military Assistance Command, Vietnam (MACV) and renamed the Field Advisory Element, Vietnam. At the peak of the war in 1968, 9,430 US Army personnel, along with smaller numbers of US Navy, US Marine Corps, US Air Force and Australian Army personnel acted as advisors down to the district and battalion level to train, advise and mentor the Army of the Republic of Vietnam (ARVN), Republic of Vietnam Marine Corps, Republic of Vietnam Navy and the Republic of Vietnam Air Force.

MAAG Indochina had three commanders: Brigadier General Francis G. Brink (who committed suicide at The Pentagon on 24 June 1952), October 1950 – June 1952; Major General Thomas J. H. Trapnell, June 1952 – April 1954; and Lieutenant General (LTG) John W. O'Daniel, April 1954 – November 1955. MAAG Vietnam was commanded by LTG Samuel T. Williams, November 1955 – September 1960; LTG Lionel C. McGarr, September 1960 – January 1962; and MG Charles J. Timmes, January 1962 – May 1964, before being reorganized on May 15, 1964 and absorbed into MACV under General Paul D. Harkins.

=== Yugoslavia ===
A MAAG of 30 officers commanded by Brigadier General John W. Harmony was established by the United States in Belgrade in 1951. It operated for ten years, disbursing military grants and arranging another US$1 billion in arms sales on favorable terms. Among weapons transferred were 599 M4A3 tanks, 319 M-47 tanks, 715 M-7, M-18, and M-36 self-propelled guns, 565 M-3A1 and M-8 armored cars, and a total of total of 760 105mm, 155mm, and 203mm artillery pieces. The artillery pieces delivered were used to reequip artillery units within Yugoslavia's eight divisions.

Harmony was promoted to major general by February 1956 and became commander of Military Advisory Assistance Group (Provisional) – Korea. He was succeeded by Willis S. Matthews in April 1957.
