= Programs Evaluation Office =

The Programs Evaluation Office was a covert paramilitary mission to the Kingdom of Laos, established on 13 December 1955 by the United States Department of Defense. The 23 July 1962 International Agreement on the Neutrality of Laos would cause it to be shut down in September 1962. It would be succeeded by the Requirements Office.

== Background ==
With the end of World War II, Laos was no longer under the French Union but became entirely sovereign and governed by the Royal Lao Government. The agreements reached at the Geneva Conference (1954) prohibited Laos from having foreign military bases and participating in any foreign military alliance, but allowed a small French military training mission which supported the Royal Lao Army. In the wake of the Geneva Conference, France announced it would cease funding the Lao government on 1 January 1955. The French training mission began to wind down. As part of its goal of containment, the U.S. sought to ensure that the Royal Lao Army was capable of meeting the threat posed by the Pathet Lao, who were backed by communist North Vietnam. In turn, on 3 December 1955, the RLG requested that the United States step into the void. Ten days later, the Programs Evaluation Office was established. Staffed by 12 retired American military or reserve personnel, the PEO skirted the conditions of the Geneva agreement by its civilian staffing. Retired Brigadier General Rothwell H. Brown, who reported to the Commander in Chief Pacific Command, headed the office. The PEO kept a low profile as it began working to improve an army of 23,000 undereducated and poorly trained peasants. By 1957, PEO was slated for a staff of 60, although turnover kept onboard staff to about 30 men. Progress in upgrading the RLA was at a standstill; the French military mission had dwindled with their involvement in their Algerian War. Such French trainers as were assigned were reluctant to cooperate with Americans, and regarded the Lao as inferior recruits for soldiering.

== Operational history ==
=== Beginning ===
A coalition government emerged in Vientiane in 1957, which included royalists as well as the Pathet Lao. When the United States wanted to influence the 1958 Lao elections, it staged Operation Booster Shot. This civic action program was supported by a PEO supervised air lift by the Central Intelligence Agency's proprietary civilian airline, CAT, as well as by the U.S. Air Force. The Pathet Lao formed a coalition with a minor party when they garnered 14 of 21 seats in the National Assembly. The PEO's election advice to the Royal Lao Government politicians—to run a single slate of candidates to avoid splitting the votes—went unheeded. Indeed, in one instance, the supporters of one defeated RLG candidate told him he had never asked them to vote for him.

By May 1958, the U.S. Department of Defense was proposing a training mission by civilian technicians to the Royal Lao Army to retrain four of its branches—logistics, communications, ordnance, and combat engineers. Later that year, a small group of military advisers arrived to teach construction of airfields, bridges, and highways. In October 1958, 39 training slots for Lao officers and non-commissioned officers were reserved for 1959 courses at Fort Benning, Georgia. In conjunction with the Central Intelligence Agency, PEO trained some regular Lao soldiers into Scout Ranger Teams; these would later evolve into two paratroop battalions. However, the most important event was the arrival of former General John A. Heintges as head of PEO in September 1958. In 1960, the commander was Andrew J. Boyle.

=== Up-grade and end ===
Heintges assessed the PEO program with an eye to improvement. As he noted in his report, both the American and Lao ends of the PEO program had major problems. To date, the PEO had served as a simple conduit for military materials supplied to the Royal Lao Army. It made no followup beyond delivery. The RLA, on the other hand, reflected some severe faults of the French army. Most deleterious was the stratification between the officers, NCOs, and enlisted ranks. The officer corps was arrogant and distant in its relationship with NCOs and enlisted men; it seldom led in the field. Responsibility for leadership thus devolved on under-educated and under-trained sergeants. Military equipment was scarce and outdated. Heintges moved to address the problems he saw. He brought in a new larger PEO staff of 65 in December; most were veterans of the Third Infantry Division during World War II, as was Heintges. He also advocated for military training teams of Green Berets.

The 107 Green Berets of Project Hotfoot arrived on 24 July 1959. Led by Arthur D. "Bull" Simons, the dozen eight-man teams were shared out three per training base at Luang Prabang, Pakse, Savannakhet, and Vientiane. Even as the Operation Hotfoot teams began weapons training and the French military mission taught tactics, the RLA was losing a series of skirmishes in Xam Neua near the Vietnamese border. The training was held in abeyance while the Green Berets surveyed the situation. They deemed the higher command of the RLA inexperienced, especially in command of any unit above company level, or in staff positions. Having surveyed the situation, the Green Berets began training in September 1959. That same month, under the codename Project Erawan, the Royal Thai Army began training 1,400 Lao recruits in guerrilla and counter-guerrilla warfare.

The structure of the Royal Lao Army was a conventional one, with the Royal Lao Air Force and the River Flotilla were both subordinate to it. In conjunction with the regular units, the RLA also had a home guard organization of 100-man companies, the Auto Defense Corps. It was authorized a strength of 16,000 militiamen. PEO reached out to other countries, in an attempt to arrange additional training cadre. Overtures to Malaysia and South Vietnam were unsuccessful. However, in September 1959, the Royal Thai Government agreed to retrain paratroopers at Camp Erawan in Lopburi. PEO also was successful in hiring technicians in the Philippines. Filipino technicians from Eastern Construction Company (abbreviated as ECCOIL) arrived under contract to instruct the nascent Royal Lao Air Force, as well as the sailors of the Mekong River Flotilla. Displaced French trainers were to devolve to the RLA's regional training centers. In November, PEO began contact with the Committee for the Defence of the National Interests, a political faction of younger Lao military officers.

On 25 December 1959, General Phoumi Nosavan seized Vientiane. By the New Year, he had dissolved the National Assembly and firmly installed himself as head of the Lao government. By this time, the PEO had increased to an onboard strength of 175, a mixed crew of civilians and temporarily assigned U.S. military. A second Hotfoot contingent rotated in for duty. However, now that the PEO began to make progress on the military task of upgrading the RLA, internal political disagreements began to hamper them, as elections were slated for 24 April 1960. Once again, the PEO carried out a civic action program meant to influence voters to support anticommunist candidates for office. This was successful to the extent that the Pathet Lao lost an election widely perceived as fraudulent. On 23 May, they fled into the wilderness of Houaphanh Province to once again foment an insurrection.

Then on August 9, 1960, Phoumi’s government was removed in a lightning coup d'état by a group termed the Neutralists led by Captain Kong Le, a paratroop officer of the Royal Lao Army. PEO headquarters in Vientiane became inactive following Kong Le's takeover of the city, but the PEO branch office in Savannakhét continued to supply and pay General Phoumi Nosavan's troops. Eventually, on 14 December 1960, Phoumi re-captured Vientiane.

The Central Intelligence Agency infiltrated Laos with Thai commandos at that time. After the momentous meeting between CIA agent James William Lair and Vang Pao, the PEO was tasked with funding of the first 2,000 irregulars under Operation Momentum. The justification for not tasking PEO for the Momentum mission was PEO's rigid adherence to long-term planning.

In April 1961, the PEO was upgraded to a Military Assistance Advisory Group (MAAG), and its members were allowed to wear uniforms within Laos. On 29 April 1961, Project Erawan morphed into Project Ekarad; despite the code name change, Lao troops still trained in Lopburi, Thailand. By June 1962, the MAAG had grown to a staff of 866, with a further 465 Filipinos from ECCOIL also employed. The MAAG was withdrawn to Thailand by October 1962 under the terms of the Geneva Agreement, becoming Deputy Chief, Joint United States Military Assistance Advisory Group Thailand. The Programs Evaluation Office would eventually be replaced by the Requirements Office of the U.S. Embassy.

During its existence, the Programs Evaluation Office controlled logistics to as many as 30,000 Royalist regular soldiers. It was denied control of the Project Momentum effort to train Hmong as irregular military. Despite PEO, "...the Laotian army continued to distinguish itself primarily by its lassitude and incompetence." Essentially, the Hmong were becoming the Lao government's combatants, leading to unsuccessful PEO attempts to gain control over the guerrillas.
