= Requirements Office =

The Requirements Office (RO) was a sub rosa Military Assistance Advisory Group set up during the Laotian Civil War. It was established in September 1962 in the United States embassy in Laos, as a replacement for a similar preceding unit, the Programs Evaluation Office (PEO). The RO's role was furnishing the Royal Lao Army with munitions and supplies to support their war effort against the People's Army of Vietnam. The RO would eventually be absorbed into the Defense Attachés Office on 8 August 1973.

== Background ==
In July 1962, the International Agreement on the Neutrality of Laos was signed by 14 countries, including the United States and North Vietnam. To honor it, the US moved its Programs Evaluation Office monitoring military aid to the Kingdom of Laos to Thailand. When it became apparent that People's Army of Vietnam troops remained in Laos in violation of the treaty, the US established the Requirements Office in September 1962 to replace the disbanded PEO in its secretive support of the Royalists in the Laotian Civil War. The Requirements Office was responsible of determining the military needs of the Royal Lao Army and supplying them accordingly. The PEO, having been moved to Thailand, was renamed Deputy Chief, Joint United States Military Advisory Group Thailand (DEPCHIEFJUSMAGTHAI) and served to expedite shipments to the new Requirements Office.

== Operations ==
The Requirements Office of the United States Agency for International Development was staffed by 25 U.S. military retirees, supplemented by Third World technicians. Its brief was to supply skilled personnel for the technical tasks beyond the capabilities of the Lao military; its brief was the management of budget and materiel for an army of 15,000 to 20,000 regular troops. Additionally, there was a tentative requirement to supply Forces Armee Neutraliste (Neutralist Armed Forces). The RO worked directly under the U.S. Ambassador to Laos. It also kept DEPCHIEFJUSMAGTHAI informed of operations within Laos. This situation was not without controversy; the Pathet Lao accused the RO of harboring Central Intelligence Agency spies. The Requirements Office was the only instance known of military intercession into USAID's global operations. Nevertheless, USAID Laos not only disguised military cadre and munitions, but supported ongoing war operations with its refugee relief program. The Requirements Office thus performed its supply and logistics function to the Royal Lao Army under civilian cover; it left supply of irregular forces to the Central Intelligence Agency. For a short period in 1963, the RO again supplied the Forces Armee Neutraliste when it allied with the Royalists. The RO's performance was lauded by the man who ran the war in Laos, Ambassador William H. Sullivan.

In December 1968, the RO took a survey of the administration and supply of the Royal Lao Air Force. They discovered no accounting for materiel; the Lao logistics system was plagued by theft, erratic distribution of goods, and overstocking on some items. To counter these problems, the RO instituted a troop welfare program for the RLAF financed by sale of such leavings as cartridge cases, scrap lumber, and used cluster bomb units.

On 21 February 1973, the Laotian Civil War ended with a ceasefire. U.S. funding dwindled from $300 million per year to $100 million, now that the Royal Lao Armed Forces were no longer a wartime military. As part of reducing the embassy staff by half, the Defense Attache's Office was founded on 8 August 1973, staffed by 30 military personnel and 15 civilian employees. The Requirements Office was moved to DEPCHIEFJUSMAGTHAI as a forward supply unit.
