= February 1960 =

Month of 1960

<<	February 1960					>>
Su	Mo	Tu	We	Th	Fr	Sa
	1	2	3	4	5	6
7	8	9	10	11	12	13
14	15	16	17	18	19	20
21	22	23	24	25	26	27
28	29

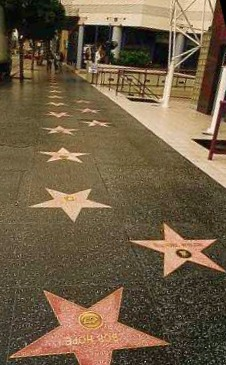
February 8, 1960: The Hollywood Walk of Fame dedicated

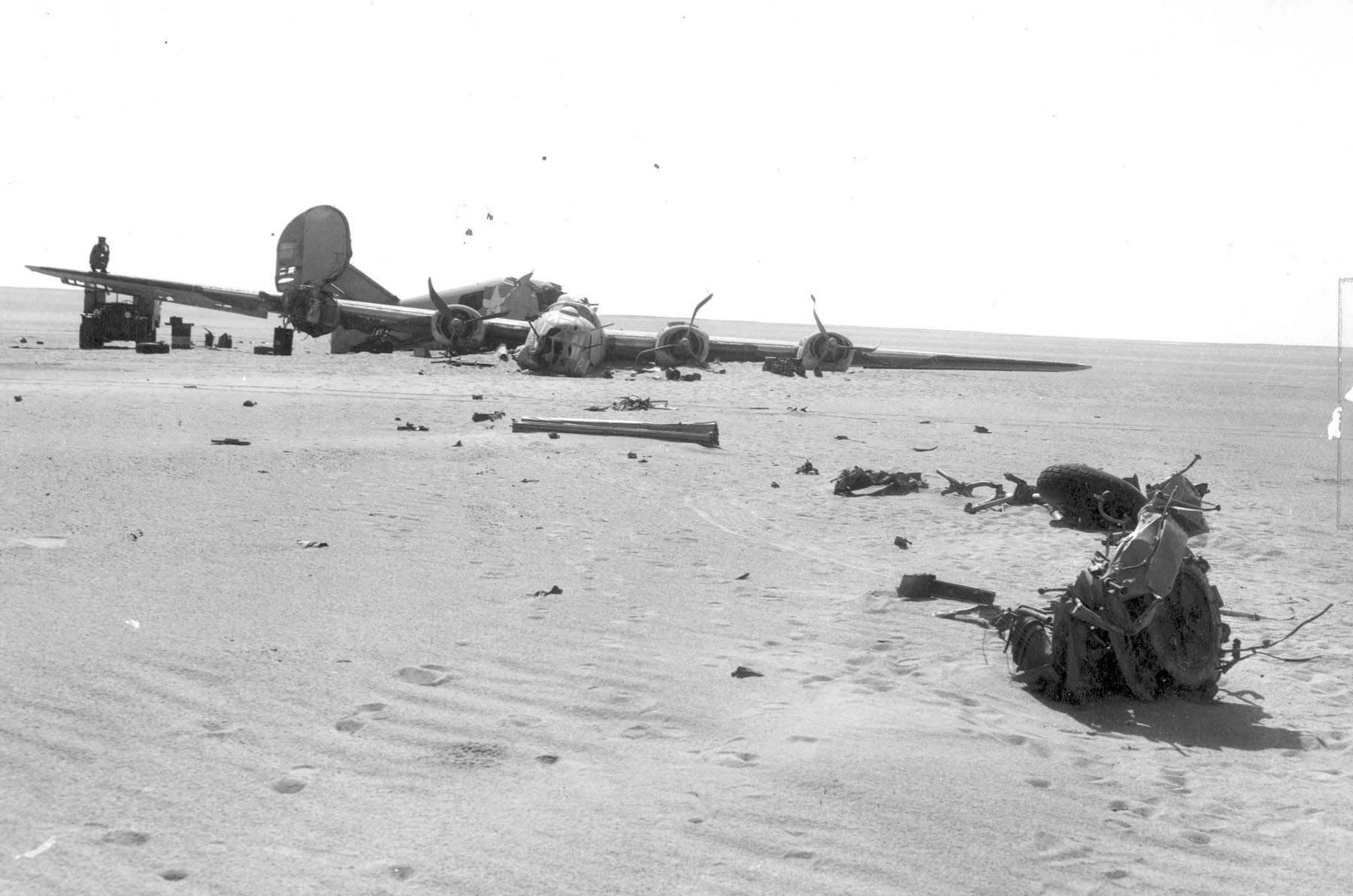
February 11, 1960: The crew of Lady Be Good located after 16 years

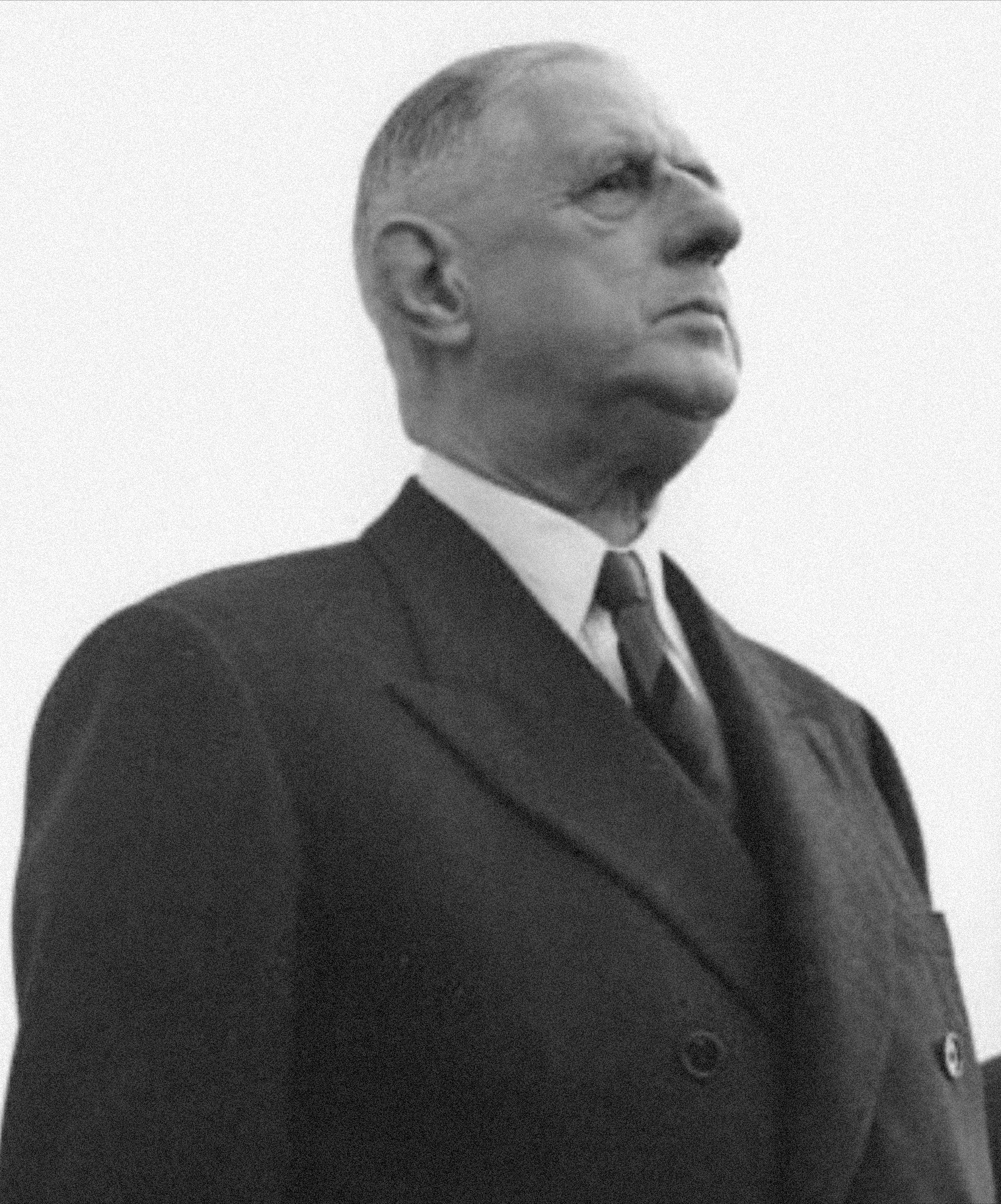
February 3, 1960: France's President De Gaulle authorized to rule by decree

The following events occurred in February 1960:

== February 1, 1960 (Monday) ==
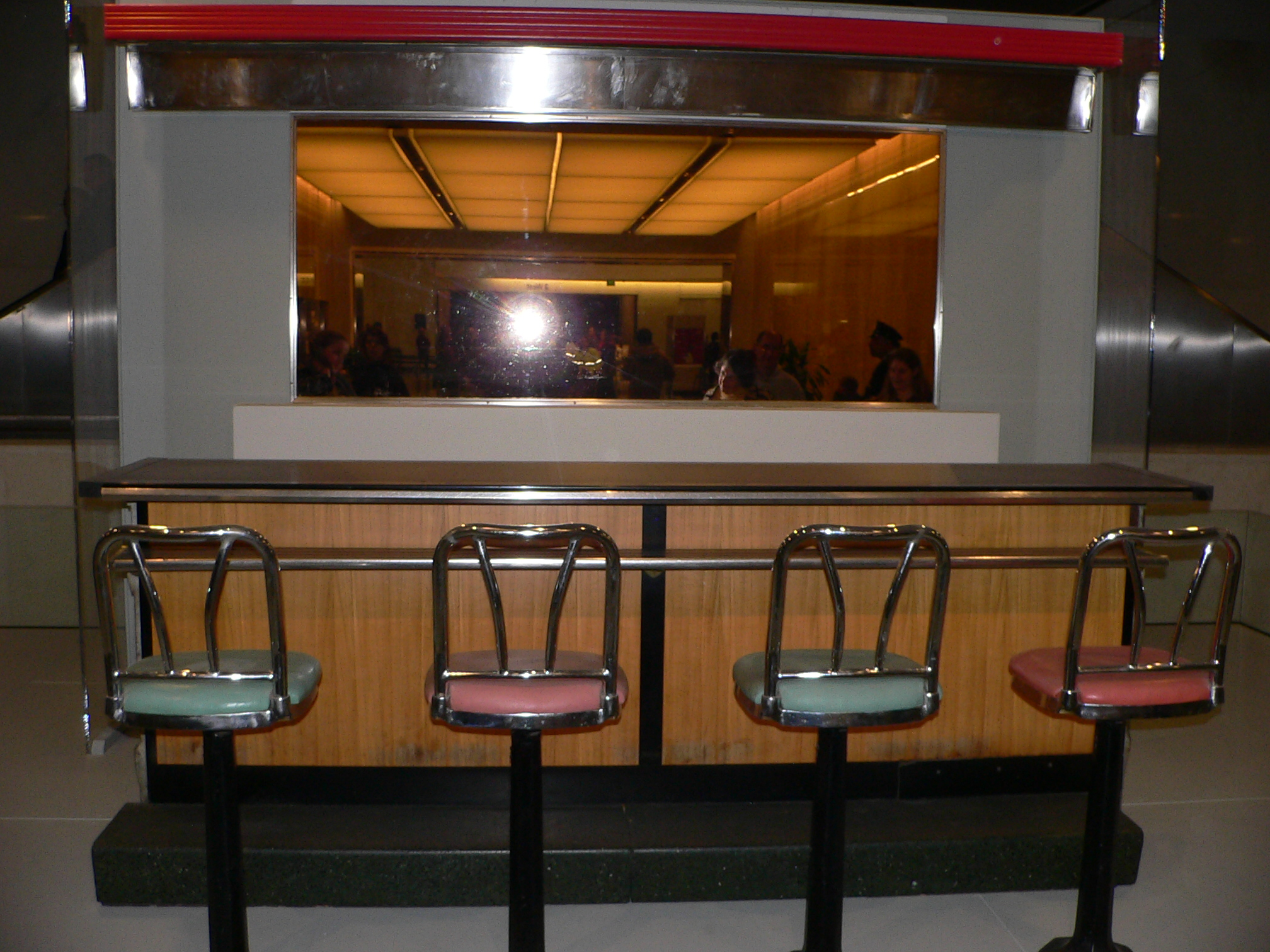
February 1, 1960: The Greensboro sit-ins began at this section of lunch counter from the Greensboro, North Carolina Woolworth's

- In Greensboro, North Carolina, four black students from North Carolina Agricultural and Technical State University began a sit-in at the Woolworth's department store, at a lunch counter that, like many in the South, would not serve African-American customers except for take-out orders. After their classes, the four young men (Joseph McNeil, David Richmond, Franklin McCain and Ezell Blair Jr.) entered Woolworth's, made some purchases, and at 4:30, took seats at the counter and politely placed orders for desserts and coffee. When the waitress told them they could not be served, they stayed until closing time. The next morning, at least 20 students came to Woolworth's and began taking up seats as they became available. By Wednesday, the sit-ins were national news, and the next week, spread to other cities. By summer, most chain stores ended their whites-only policy.
- Viscount Dunrossil (William Shepherd Morrison) became the 14th Governor-General of Australia, succeeding William Slim, 1st Viscount Slim, who had served two terms before retiring.
- A study was completed for Project Mercury on the "External and Internal Noise of Space Capsules." This study covered the acoustic environments of missile and space vehicles including noise generated by the rocket engines, air-boundary layers, and on-board equipment. NASA officials thought that the internal noise level was too high for pilot comfort. Space Task Group felt that data were needed on noise transmission through an actual production-model spacecraft structure.

== February 2, 1960 (Tuesday) ==
- At an exhibition at the Logan Billiard Academy in Brooklyn, Mike Eufemia set a record that has remained for half a century, for the longest "run", sinking 625 consecutive billiard balls without a miss.
- Born:
  - Fred D'Aguiar, British-Guyanese author; in London
  - Jari Porttila, Finnish sports journalist; in Helsinki
- Died: Bharati Krishna Tirtha, 75, Hindu teacher

== February 3, 1960 (Wednesday) ==
- Before a session of the Parliament of South Africa in Cape Town, Britain's Prime Minister Harold Macmillan made the "Wind of Change" speech, telling the all-white assembly that "The wind of change is blowing through this continent, and whether we like it or not, this growth of national consciousness is a political fact. We must all accept it as a fact, and our national policies must take account of it."
- The Senate of France voted 226–39 to allow President Charles De Gaulle to rule by decree in order to dismantle the power of French settlers in Algeria. The National Assembly had approved the measure the day before, 441–75. "We almost saw a collapse of the state last week", Prime Minister Michel Debre told the Senators, in urging passage of the measure.
- U.S. President Eisenhower announced at a news conference that the United States should be able to make nuclear weapons available to its allies. Eisenhower urged that the Atomic Energy Act be amended in order to permit the U.S. to transfer weapons to the arsenals of other nations.
- Born:
  - Joachim Löw, coach of Germany national team in soccer football; in Schönau im Schwarzwald
  - Kerry Von Erich, American professional wrestler; in Niagara Falls, New York (d. 1993)
- Died: Fred Buscaglione, 38, Italian singer and actor, was killed in an auto accident.

== February 4, 1960 (Thursday) ==
- After a brief interview, France's President De Gaulle fired Jacques Soustelle from the post of Deputy Prime Minister for Algeria. Soustelle, the highest ranking French government official in the overseas Department, was the first of the European Algerians to be dismissed as part of De Gaulle's rule by decree.
- Jordan offered citizenship to any Palestinian (defined as a person who "used to have the Palestinian Nationality before May 1948, excluding Jews") living abroad.
- The Soviet Union's support of Cuba as a Communist ally was forged as Soviet Deputy Premier Anastas Mikoyan was welcomed in Havana by Fidel Castro.

== February 5, 1960 (Friday) ==
- Amon Ndoffou II, King of Sanwi, one of the leaders of the Anyi people of Côte d'Ivoire (Côte d'Ivoire), declared an independent kingdom, six months before the colony was scheduled to become independent from France. Ivorian troops arrested the King and his Prime Minister, Ehoumou Bile, and ended the secession attempt without bloodshed.
- All 59 people on board a Lloyd Aéreo Boliviano DC-4 died when the plane crashed shortly after takeoff from Cochabamba, Bolivia.
- The CERN particle accelerator was inaugurated in Geneva, Switzerland.
- A meeting was held to relay the decision that beryllium shingles would be used as the best heat protection material on the cylindrical section of the Mercury spacecraft.

== February 6, 1960 (Saturday) ==
- In the first elections in Burma since a 1958 military coup, former Prime Minister U Nu's party captured 150 of the 250 contested seats. He took office on April 4.
- Died: Jesse Belvin, 27, African-American singer-songwriter was killed in an auto accident, four hours after performing a concert with Sam Cooke and Jackie Wilson.

== February 7, 1960 (Sunday) ==
- Laurence Slattery and Lesley Wasley, both volunteers, permitted a team of Australian doctors at the Royal Prince Alfred Hospital in Sydney to administer curare to stop their breathing, in order to demonstrate the effectiveness of various forms of artificial respiration. Among the findings were that a drowning victim's head should be placed upright, rather than to the side, to aid breathing.
- Frank Sinatra introduced Democratic presidential candidate John F. Kennedy to Judith Campbell Exner. JFK and Exner would have their first sexual encounter on March 7 at Room 1651 of the Plaza Hotel in New York.
- Twenty-five people were killed and 50 more injured in a railroad derailment near Sewell, Chile. The train was transporting employees of the Braden Copper Mining Company, and their families, on a Sunday outing.
- Born: James Spader, American TV actor; in Boston
- Died:
  - Gilbert Vernam, 69, American cryptographer
  - Igor Kurchatov, 57, Soviet nuclear physicist

== February 8, 1960 (Monday) ==
- The Hollywood Walk of Fame was dedicated, starting with 1,558 names placed on terrazzo stars along Hollywood Boulevard in Hollywood, California, as an urban renewal program.
- Queen Elizabeth II announced that her future descendants would bear her husband's name as well as her own, creating the surname Mountbatten-Windsor.
- Tests were started by the Army Ballistic Missile Agency for the mission abort sensing program to be integrated in the Mercury-Redstone phase of Project Mercury.
- Born: Benigno Aquino III, 15th President of the Philippines from 2010 to 2016; in Sampaloc, Manila (d. 2021)
- Died: Sir Giles Gilbert Scott, 79, British architect

== February 9, 1960 (Tuesday) ==
- Adolph Coors III, chairman of the Coors Brewing Company, disappeared shortly after leaving his house near Morrison, Colorado, for a 9:00 a.m. meeting with brewery executives at Golden. His truck was found later that morning, and his glasses were nearby. A demand for $500,000 was found the next day, but the kidnapper did not follow up. Coors's body was found on September 12. Joseph Corbett, Jr. was later convicted of the kidnapping and murder. Corbett would be paroled in 1978 and live until 2009.
- Died:
  - Jaroslav Joseph Polivka, 73, Czech structural engineer
  - Ernő Dohnányi, 82, Hungarian conductor

== February 10, 1960 (Wednesday) ==
- Soviet leader Nikita S. Khrushchev began a 24-day tour of South Asia, traveling to India, Burma, Indonesia, and Afghanistan. While Khrushchev was abroad, U.S. President Dwight D. Eisenhower set off on February 22 for a 14-day tour of Latin America, going to Brazil, Argentina, Chile and Uruguay. Both men returned to their home nations in March.
- At Johor Baru, in Malaya, the new Sultan of Johor was crowned.
- Died: Alojzije Stepinac, 61, Archbishop of Zagreb, Roman Catholic Cardinal, and political prisoner who was detained in Yugoslavia for his opposition to the communist government.

== February 11, 1960 (Thursday) ==
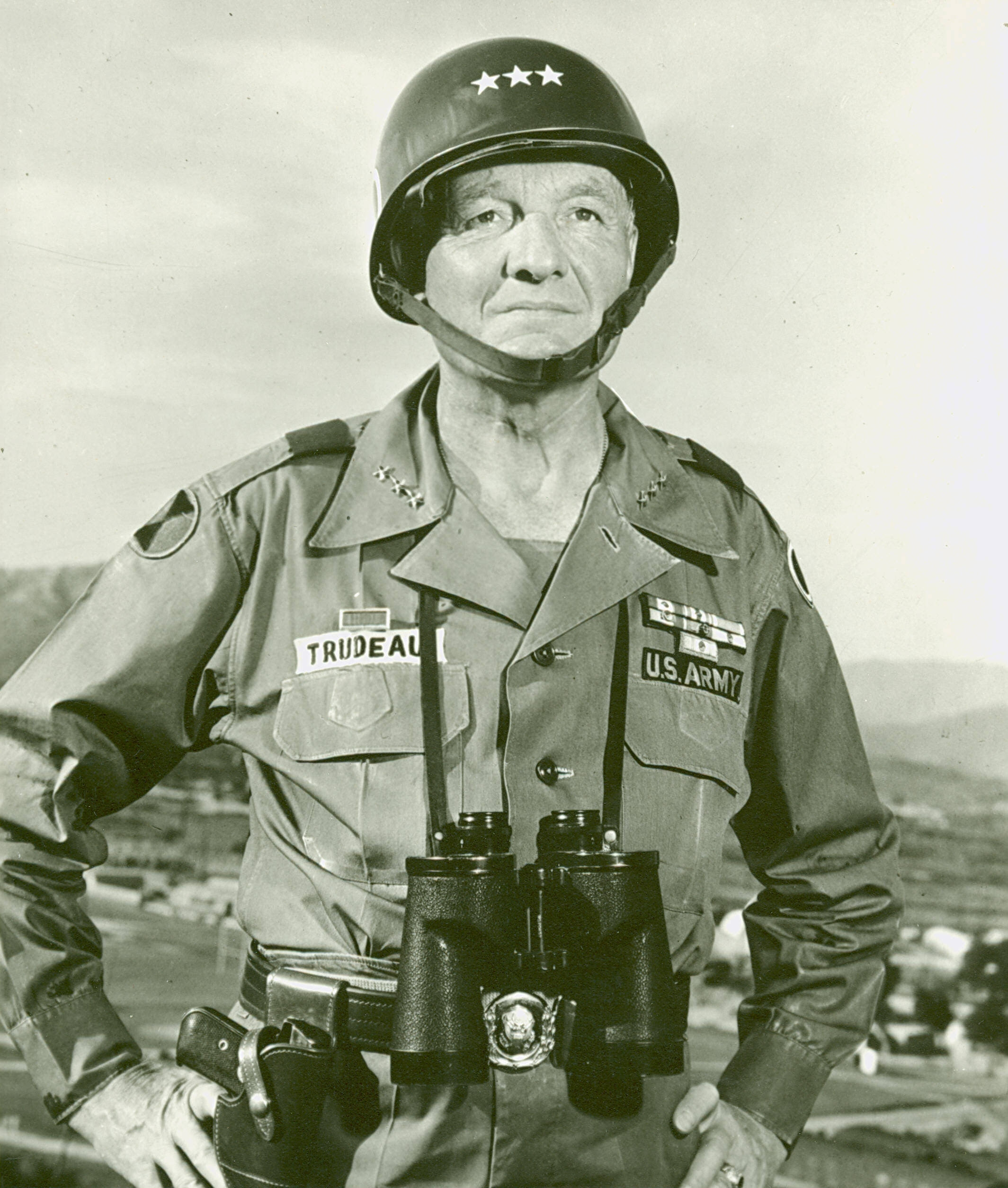
Gen. Trudeau

- Lt. Gen. Arthur G. Trudeau, chief of research for the United States Army, inadvertently revealed classified information during a press conference, when he disclosed that an atomic explosion could neutralize a hydrogen bomb through the principle of neutron flux. General Trudeau said that it would be better to have "a small explosion a hundred miles over Hartford, Connecticut, than a large explosion in New York City."
- Exploration worker James Backhaus located the bodies of five crewmembers of the B-24 Liberator Lady Be Good in the Libyan desert, 16 years after the airplane had vanished on April 4, 1943, during the Second World War. The men had walked 85 miles (137 km) in hopes of finding help before running out of water.
- Jack Paar quit his job as host of The Tonight Show on NBC, a day after the network had censored a joke in his monologue. Paar later returned, but in 1962, the show was turned over to Johnny Carson.

== February 12, 1960 (Friday) ==
- Eleven days after the first "sit-in" took place in Greensboro, North Carolina, the Congress of Racial Equality (CORE) implemented a plan for its members to participate in sit-ins across the South.
- Laurens Hammond, who had created the first electronic organ and a synchronous motor for the first accurate electric clock, retired from inventing.
- With Project Mercury about to enter a heavy operational phase, an operations coordination group was established at the Atlantic Missile Range. Christopher C. Kraft, Jr. was appointed to head this group.

== February 13, 1960 (Saturday) ==
- Deputy Premier Anastas Mikoyan of the Soviet Union and Cuba's Premier Fidel Castro signed an agreement that guaranteed the Castro government a $100,000,000 line of credit until 1972, and provided that the Soviets would buy one million tons of Cuban sugar per year for five years.
- At 0604 GMT, France became the world's fourth nuclear power, when it successfully exploded an atomic bomb near Reggane, at Algeria in the Sahara Desert. The test was codenamed Gerboise Bleue.
- Born:
  - Pierluigi Collina, Italian FIFA (soccer football) referee; in Bologna
  - Gary Patterson, American college football coach; in Larned, Kansas

== February 14, 1960 (Sunday) ==
- Field Marshal Muhammad Ayub Khan of Pakistan was confirmed as its President through a limited referendum that he had called as a test of his theory of "basic democracy". The 80,000 village councilmen who had been elected locally were called upon to vote "yes" or "no" on Ayub's continuance in office, and 75,283 of them voted in the affirmative.
- The United Kingdom signed a new treaty of protection with the Maldives, which had been a British protectorate since 1887. The Indian Ocean island group was granted independence in 1965.
- Born: Jim Kelly, American pro football quarterback for the Buffalo Bills and the USFL Houston Gamblers; in Pittsburgh

== February 15, 1960 (Monday) ==
- War threatened to break out between Egypt (at that time partnered with Syria in the United Arab Republic) and Israel, after the UAR's President Nasser received inaccurate information that Israeli troops were massing at Israel's border with Syria. Nasser then sent a major portion of the Egyptian army to Israel's border with Egypt, and Israel then began Operation Rottem. The two sides halted war preparations after discovering the misunderstanding, and both sides stood down on March 1.
- Mercury spacecraft battery qualification, landing system and post-landing equipment tests were completed.
- Died: Cho Pyong-ok, 65, the leading opposition candidate in South Korea's upcoming presidential election, died while receiving medical treatment in the United States. With no opponent, President Syngman Rhee was re-elected for a fourth term as South Korea's president.

== February 16, 1960 (Tuesday) ==
- The nuclear submarine USS Triton submerged upon departure from New London, Connecticut, and, with 184 people on board, began "Operation Sandblast", an underwater voyage around the world that would end 83 days later on May 10. Though forced to broach its sail above the surface on March 5 in order to transfer a seriously ill sailor to another ship, USS Triton would spend the rest of the circumnavigation entirely undersea.

== February 17, 1960 (Wednesday) ==
- The United Kingdom and the United States jointly announced that a missile warning system would be constructed at the North York Moors in Yorkshire. Britain's RAF Fylingdales would join stations at Thule AFB in Greenland, and Clear AFS in Alaska as the third and final station in BMEWS, the Ballistic Missile Early Warning System.

== February 18, 1960 (Thursday) ==
- Pilot Charles Hayes and two passengers died when their twin engine plane crashed near the St. Gertrude School in the village of Indian Hill, Ohio, a suburb of Cincinnati. Hayes was credited posthumously with applying a final thrust to the engines to avoid crashing into the school.
- U.S. Vice-President Richard M. Nixon opened the 1960 Winter Olympics in Squaw Valley, California, despite severe winter weather that kept away most of the spectators. The Games attracted 740 athletes from 30 nations.

== February 19, 1960 (Friday) ==
- The proposed eight-team Continental League announced a definite opening day to begin play as baseball's third major league. CL founder Branch Rickey and Toronto owner Jack Kent Cooke said that on April 18, 1961, the teams in Denver, Dallas-Fort Worth, Houston and Atlanta would host the teams from Minneapolis-St. Paul, New York City, Toronto and Buffalo.
- The Chinese space program began its first step "in a long march toward outer space", with the launch of the liquid-propelled T-7 rocket. The missile, made entirely within the People's Republic, only reached an altitude of 5 miles (8.0 km), but was a successful sub-orbital flight. China first put a satellite into space in 1970 and put a man into orbit in 2003.
- Physician Barbara Moulton resigned in protest from the U.S. Food and Drug Administration, writing a letter to Commissioner George P. Larrick that included the accusation that the FDA had "failed utterly in its solemn task of enforcing those sections of the law dealing with the safety and misbranding of drugs".
- Born: Andrew Mountbatten-Windsor, third child of Britain's Queen Elizabeth II; at Buckingham Palace in London
- Died: Hans Christian Hansen, 53, 16th Prime Minister of Denmark since 1955

== February 20, 1960 (Saturday) ==
- Following a month-long conference in Brussels, Belgium, the date of June 30 was set for granting independence to its African colony of the Belgian Congo. Under an agreement between the Belgian government and Congolese leaders, elections would be held on May 16 for provincial legislatures and a 137-member national Chamber of Representatives, and the provinces would then select a Senate.
- Born: Shoji Kawamori, Japanese animation creator and producer, screenwriter, visual artist, and mecha designer, in Toyama
- Died: Leonard Woolley, 79, British archaeologist and excavator of the Ur ruins

== February 21, 1960 (Sunday) ==
- Sunday became a regular work day in all of Sudan, after the Muslim government in Khartoum decreed that Friday was the uniform day of rest for the entire nation. Previously, provinces in southern Sudan (which had a large Christian minority and a stronger British influence under the rule of Anglo-Egyptian Sudan) had Sunday as the day off, while northern Sudan had switched to Friday upon independence in 1956.
- André Previn made the first of 51 appearances at Carnegie Hall, playing George Gershwin's Piano Concerto in F.
- Voters in a referendum in Cameroon approved a constitution by a vote of 797,498 to 531,075.
- Died:
  - Edwina Mountbatten, Countess Mountbatten of Burma, 58, wife of last Vicereine of British India
  - Jacques Becker, 54, French director

== February 22, 1960 (Monday) ==
- An explosion at the Karl Marx coal mine in Zwickau, East Germany, killed 123 miners. On February 24, a Czechoslovak mine rescue teams arrived in Zwickau to assist East German teams in the effort to find survivors. By February 27, further rescue attempts were halted and section 1 of the Karl-Marx-Werk mine was sealed off to stop further spread of the fire. Fifty-five miners were rescued or had been able to escape, and 51 bodies were recovered before the search ended, while another 72 remained entombed in the mine.
- "Theme from A Summer Place", by Percy Faith's orchestra, hit No. 1 and stayed there for nine weeks, making it the most popular song of 1960.

== February 23, 1960 (Tuesday) ==
- Demolition began at Brooklyn's Ebbets Field, home of baseball's Dodgers until their move to Los Angeles in 1958. A crowd of 200 fans and former Brooklyn players watched as Lucy Monroe sang the National Anthem at Ebbets for the last time, and a band played Auld Lang Syne. The wrecking ball, painted white and painted to resemble a giant baseball, began its work with the destruction of the visitors' dugout.
- Born: Naruhito, 126th Emperor of Japan since 2019; in Tokyo

== February 24, 1960 (Wednesday) ==
- Argentina called off its search for an "unidentified submerged object" in Golfo Nuevo. Since January 30, when a sonar picked up evidence of a trapped foreign submarine, the Argentine Navy had been searching the gulf. At one point, it appeared that there were two subs below the surface, but after more than three weeks, the Buenos Aires government concluded that if there had been a foreign sub, it had escaped.
- Four people were killed, and five others injured, by a pipeline worker turned sniper. Dan Raymond, who lived near Ohiopyle, Pennsylvania, shot two county workers who were spreading cinders, then fired from his home at other vehicles until police killed him nine hours later.
- The United States tested its first intercontinental ballistic missile (ICBM). Launched from Cape Canaveral, the Titan missile traveled 5,000 miles (8,000 km) and ejected a data capsule before crashing into the South Atlantic.
- The U.S. Food and Drug Administration approved the prescription use of the tranquilizer chlordiazepoxide, developed by Hoffmann-La Roche and marketed under the tradename Librium.
- Pakistan's President, Ayub Khan, gave final approval for the construction of a new capital city on the site of the villages of Saidpur and Nurpur. The new city would be called Islamabad.

== February 25, 1960 (Thursday) ==
- The mid-air collision of a U.S. Navy airplane and a Brazilian airline REAL Flight 751 over Rio de Janeiro killed 61 people on both airplanes. At an altitude of 1,600 metres (5,200 ft), the American plane, a DC-6 transporting a U.S. Navy band performing for U.S. President Eisenhower's visit to Brazil, struck the right side of the Brazilian DC-3 airliner, which was bringing 22 passengers and a crew of 4 from Campos dos Goytacazes. All 26 people on the Brazilian plane died, and only three of the 38 on the U.S. Navy plane— all passengers— survived.
- After having fled to Syria, Saddam Hussein was sentenced to death in absentia by a court in Iraq, for his role in conspiring to kill Prime Minister Abdul Karim Qassim. Saddam returned to Iraq after Qassim's assassination in 1963, and did not face a death sentence again until his execution on December 30, 2006.
- Lillian Hellman's play Toys in the Attic began a 464-performance run on Broadway.

== February 26, 1960 (Friday) ==
- The crash of Alitalia Airlines Flight 618 killed 23 of the 40 passengers on board, and all but one of the 12-member crew. The New York-bound Douglas DC-7 lost power shortly after takeoff from Shannon, Ireland, and crashed into a cemetery at Shannon's Clonloghan Church.
- On the same day, Aeroflot Flight 315 from Kiev to Lviv in the Ukrainian SSR crashed 1,400 metres (4,600 ft) short of the runway in Lviv after the stabilizer of the Antonov An-15 airliner became immobilized by ice. Only one of the 33 people on board, a passenger, survived.
- Britain's Princess Margaret, younger sister of Queen Elizabeth II, made the surprise announcement of her engagement to a commoner, photographer Antony Armstrong Jones.
- The establishment of a Project Mercury tracking site in Australia was sanctioned.

== February 27, 1960 (Saturday) ==
- At the 1960 Winter Olympics, Hjallis Andersen's eight-year-old world record for the men's 10,000-meter speed skating event (16:32.6) was bested by five different skaters on the same day. Kjell Bäckman of Sweden set a new world's record of 16:14.2 and qualified for the bronze. Minutes later, Knut Johannesen of Norway broke Bäckman's record with a time of 15:46.6, more than 45 seconds faster than the 1952 mark, and won the gold medal. A few minutes after that, Viktor Kosichkin of the USSR finished at 15:49.2, within 2.7 seconds of beating Johannesen, winning the silver medal. The fourth and fifth-place finishers (Ivar Nilsson of Sweden at 16:26.0 and Terence Monaghan of the UK at 16:31.6) also beat Andersen's mark.
- Born: Andrés Gómez, Ecuadorian tennis player and winner of French Open in 1990; in Guayaquil
- Died: Adriano Olivetti, 58, Italian entrepreneur who built the Olivetti company into a leading manufacturer of office machines died of a cardiac arrest shortly after the train on which he was riding crossed from Italy into Switzerland.

== February 28, 1960 (Sunday) ==
- A tip from a Soviet player helped the United States ice hockey team win the gold medal in the 1960 Winter Olympics. Exhausted from a 3–2 victory over the Soviet Union's team the day before, the Americans were losing to Czechoslovakia, 4–3, with one period left. Nikolai Sologubov suggested whiffs of bottled oxygen for quick energy, and the U.S. responded with six goals, winning 9–4.
- Born: Dorothy Stratten, Canadian Playboy model who was murdered in 1980; in Vancouver
- Died: Dr. Tom Douglas Spies, 57, American nutritionist who reduced cases of pellagra, died of cancer.

== February 29, 1960 (Monday) ==
- At 11:47 p.m., the city of Agadir in Morocco was shaken for 15 seconds by an earthquake measuring 5.7 on the Richter scale, followed by another tremor an hour later. At least 12,000 people were killed in the collapse of unreinforced stone buildings.
- The Family Circus made its debut. Initially syndicated by the Des Moines Register and Tribune, the comic panel was created by Bil Keane, whose TV-themed Channel Chuckles was already a newspaper feature. On the first day's strip, the three children had placed a sled on top of their sleeping father, and Billy's line was "Guess what it's doing out."
- St. Louis radio station KMOX revolutionized radio with the debut of a live call-in program called At Your Service.
- The Space Task Group placed a requirement with NASA Headquarters for the purchase of an analog computing facility. The planned use of this facility was to establish and verify Mercury system requirements; it also could be used for Mercury follow-on programs such as a crewed circumlunar vehicle program and other space program requirements. Cost of this facility was estimated to be $424,000.
- Born:
  - Richard Ramirez, American serial killer known as "The Night Stalker"; in El Paso, Texas (d. 2013)
  - Tony Robbins, American motivational speaker; in North Hollywood, Los Angeles, California
  - Cheb Khaled, Algerian musician nicknamed "King of Raï"; in Oran
- Died:
  - Melvin Purvis, 56, former FBI agent who had killed John Dillinger, died of a self-inflicted gunshot wound
  - Walter Yust, 65, editor-in-chief of the Encyclopædia Britannica since 1938
