= March 1960 =

Month of 1960

<<	March 1960					>>
Su	Mo	Tu	We	Th	Fr	Sa
		1	2	3	4	5
6	7	8	9	10	11	12
13	14	15	16	17	18	19
20	21	22	23	24	25	26
27	28	29	30	31

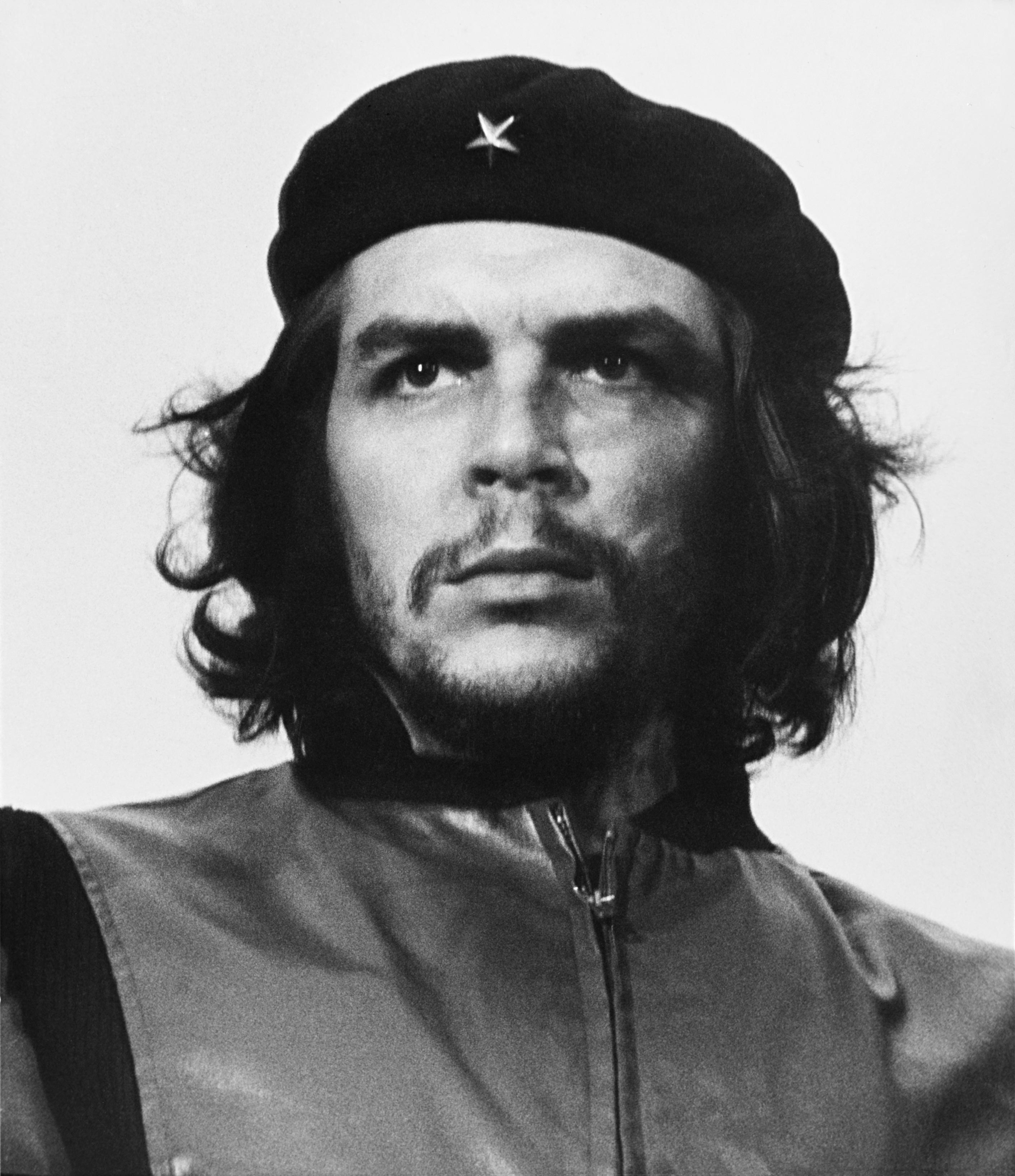
March 5, 1960: Iconic photo of Che Guevara taken by Albert Korda

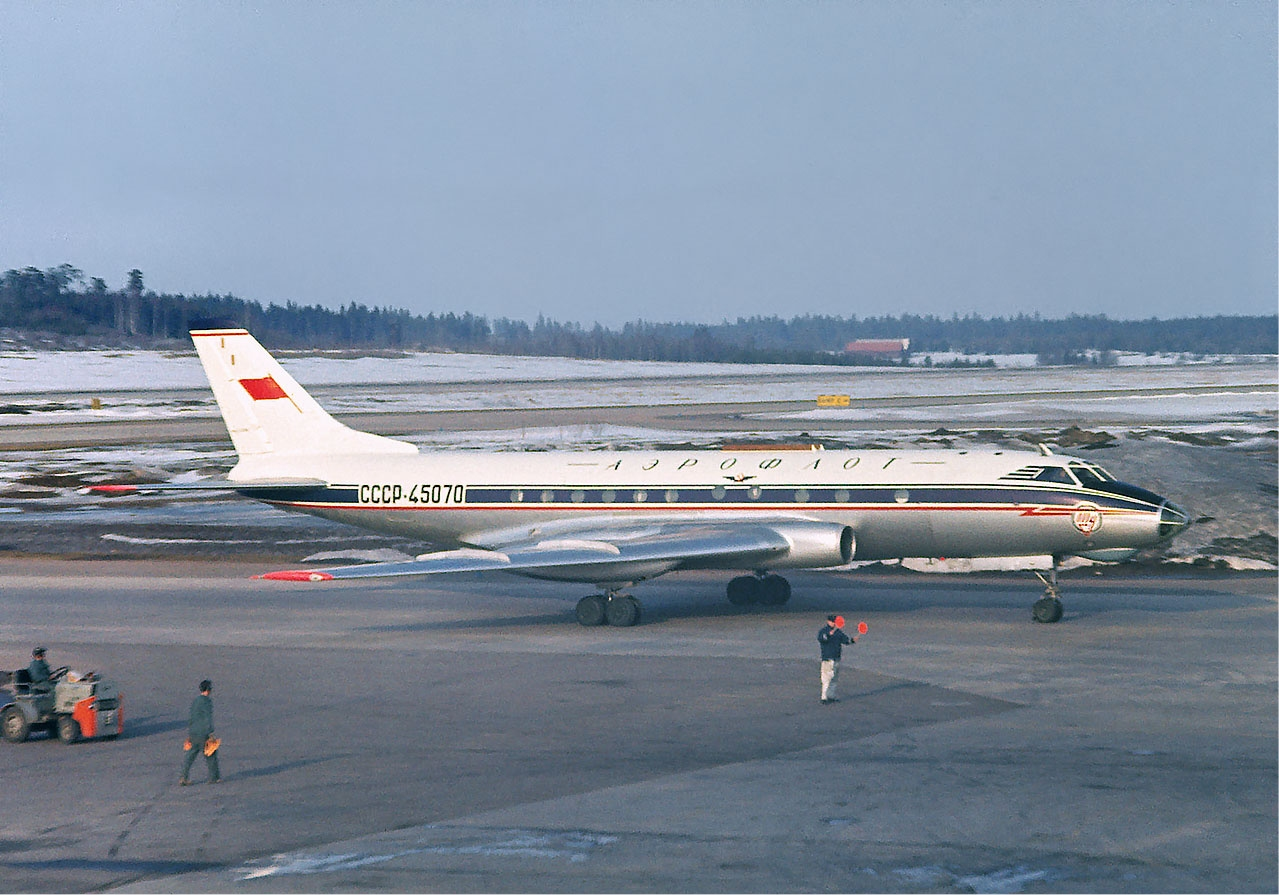
March 24, 1960: Tu-124, first turbojet, debuts

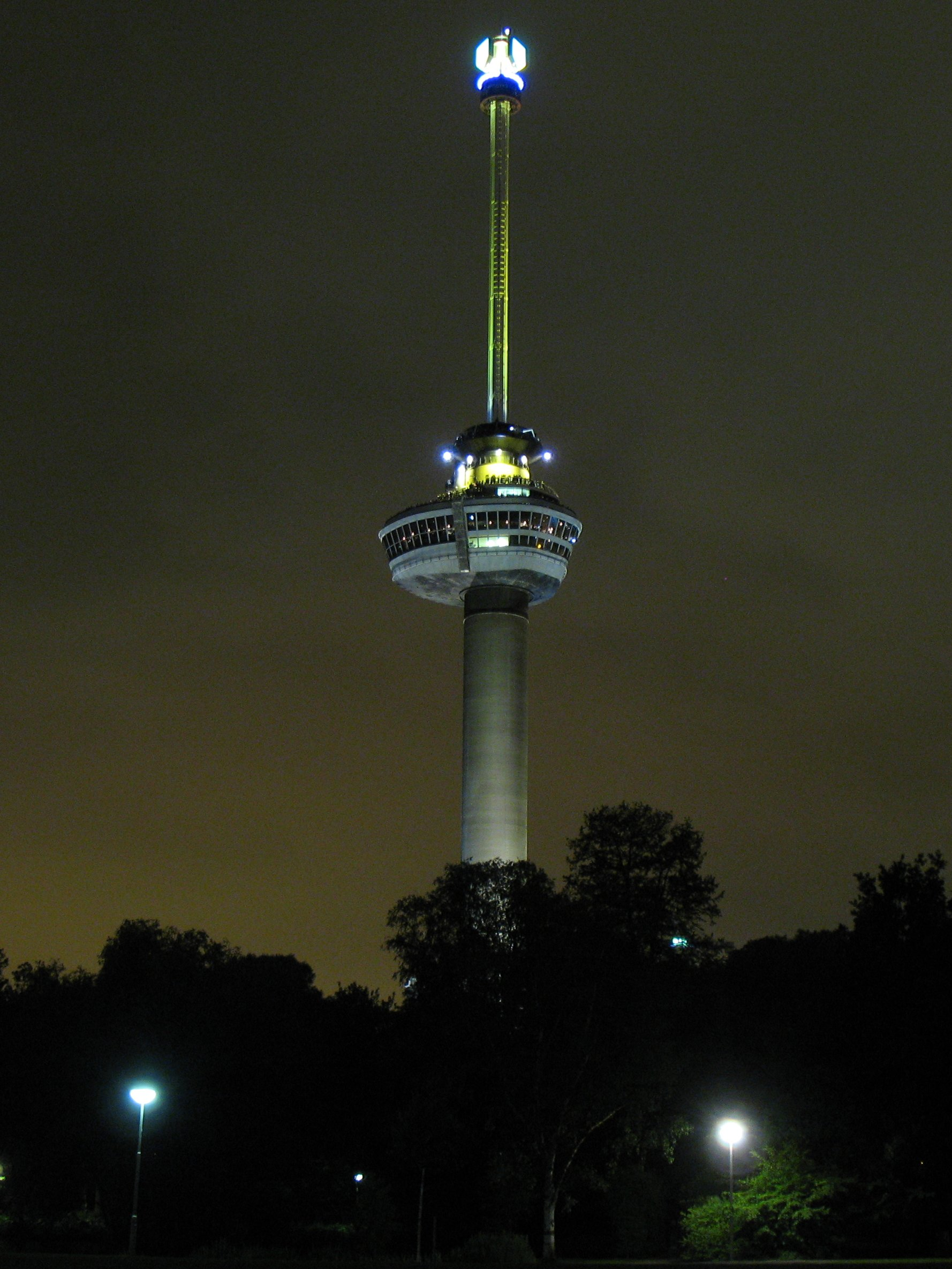
March 25, 1960: Euromast dedicated in Rotterdam

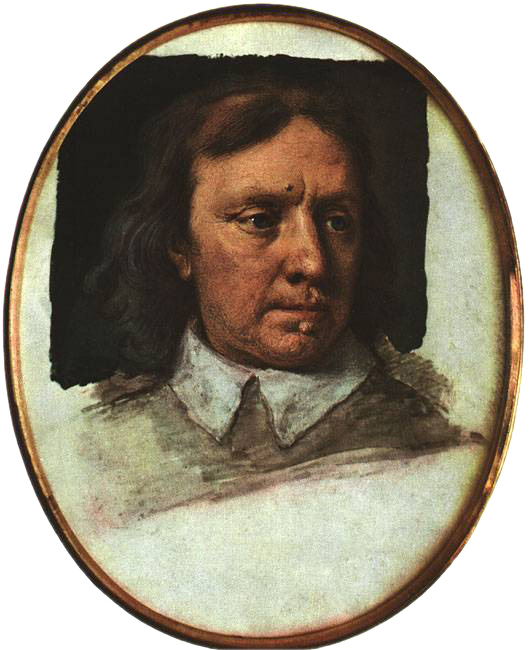
March 25, 1960: Cromwell's head reburied after 300 years

The following events occurred in March 1960:

== March 1, 1960 (Tuesday) ==
- NASA established an Office of Life Sciences to work on exobiology, based on Dr. Joshua Lederberg's ideas that space vehicles should be sterilized before and after their missions in order to prevent the possibility of contamination of outer space or of the Earth by microbes.

== March 2, 1960 (Wednesday) ==
- During a visit to Montevideo, the President of the United States was among the people who fell victim to tear gas, used by the Uruguayan police to disperse rioting university students. Dwight D. Eisenhower and his host, newly inaugurated Uruguayan President Benito Nardone, could be seen rubbing their eyes as their motorcade passed shortly after the gas was used.
- Lufthansa, the German national airline, entered the jet age with the flight of its first Boeing 707.
- Born: Hector Calma, Filipino basketball player; in Manila
- Died: Stanisław Taczak, 85, Polish General

== March 3, 1960 (Thursday) ==
- Pope John XXIII elevated seven bishops to the College of Cardinals of the Roman Catholic Church, bringing the number of members to a record high of 85. Laurean Rugambwa of Tanganyika became the first Black cardinal, while Peter Tatsuo Doi and Rufino Santos were the first cardinals from Japan and the Philippines, respectively.
- Lucille Ball filed for a divorce from Desi Arnaz. Television's Lucy and Ricky had filmed their last show together three weeks earlier. While I Love Lucy had ended in 1957, the couple had appeared later in 13 one-hour specials airing under the title The Lucy–Desi Comedy Hour. The final episode would air on April 1.
- After 28 years as a nationally known radio political commentator, Walter Winchell left the airwaves, making his final broadcast on the Mutual network.

== March 4, 1960 (Friday) ==
- Opera singer Leonard Warren died of a massive cerebral hemorrhage while performing before a live audience at the Metropolitan Opera in New York. Warren, who was only 48, was singing the role of Don Carlo in a presentation of Giuseppe Verdi's La Forza del Destino and had just finished the last line of the aria "Urna fatale del mio destino" ("Fatal pages ruling my destiny"), then fell to his knees.
- The explosion of the French cargo ship La Coubre in Havana Harbor in Cuba killed 76 people, all but six of whom were bystanders. At 3:10 p.m., the ship, carrying 70 tons of munitions from Belgium, was being unloaded when the blast happened.
- Born: John Mugabi, Ugandan boxer, and WBC World Junior Middleweight champion from 1989 to 1990; in Kampala

== March 5, 1960 (Saturday) ==
- The iconic image of Che Guevara (seen above) was taken by photographer Alberto Korda, who was on assignment from the Cuban government newspaper Revolucion to cover a protest rally the day after the explosion of the freighter La Coubre. The photo attained worldwide popularity in 1968 after Korda gave a copy to Italian publisher Giangiacomo Feltrinelli.
- Staff Sergeant Elvis Presley was honorably discharged from active service in the United States Army, nearly two years after being drafted into the service on March 24, 1958. After departing from Fort Dix in New Jersey, Presley remained in the U.S. Army reserve for four additional years until completing his military obligations.
- The Gao-Guenie meteorite, weighing more than one ton, landed near the village of Gao in the African nation of Upper Volta (now Burkina Faso). The sound of the impact was heard 100 kilometres (62 mi) away.
- President Sukarno of Indonesia dissolved the House of Representatives from the 1955 election because the House only approved a budget of 36 billion rupiah out of the government-proposed 44 billion rupiah. It became one of the defining moments of the Guided Democracy era in Indonesia.
- BNT first airs Leka nosht, deca.

== March 6, 1960 (Sunday) ==
- The Food Additives Amendment to the Federal Food, Drug, and Cosmetic Act took effect. Prior to the amendment, there was no requirement for government approval of additives to food sold in the United States.
- President Eisenhower announced that 3,500 American troops would be posted to South Vietnam.

== March 7, 1960 (Monday) ==
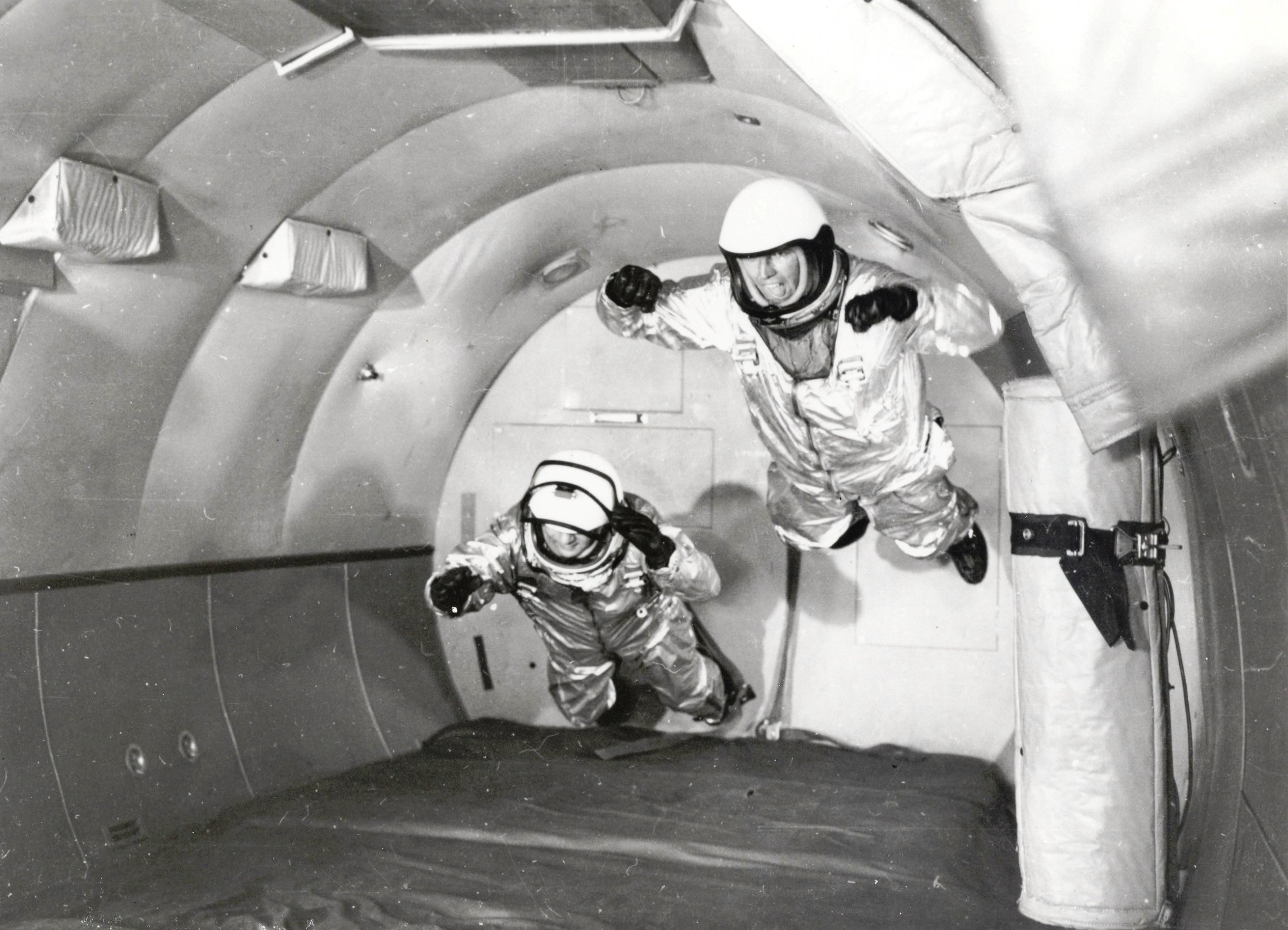
Mercury astronauts on the C-131B

- The first simulation of weightlessness for the Mercury astronauts, using reduced-gravity aircraft flying, was made in three days of an indoctrination for at the Wright Air Development Center in Dayton, Ohio. In order to create an environment of free-floating during weightless flight, a modified C-131B Samaritan aircraft repeatedly flew a parabolic course, during which the astronauts were floating each time from 12 to 15 seconds. In all, 90 parabolic flights were made, during which the practiced using tools and moving weights while in a weightless condition.

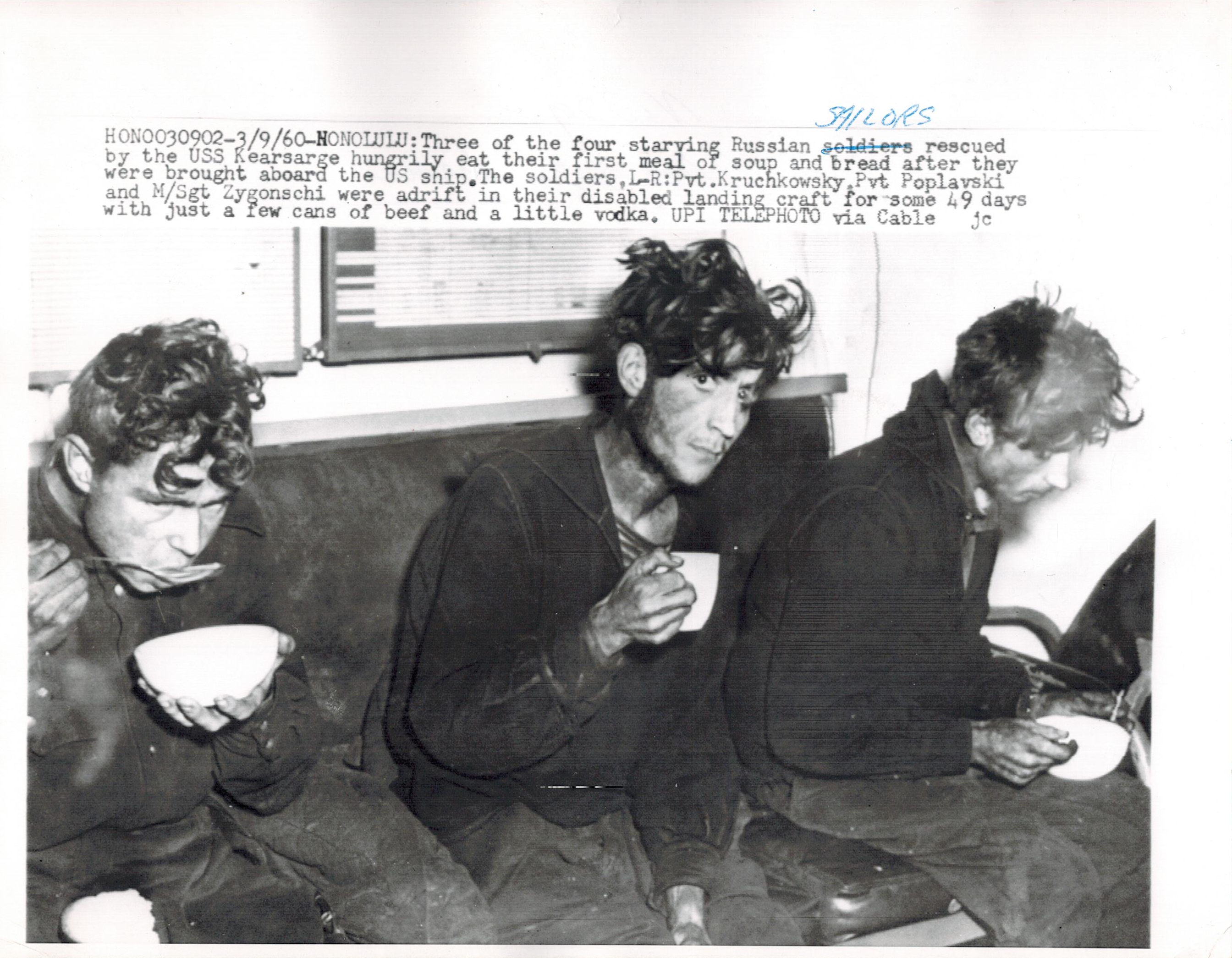
Kryuchkovsky, Poplavsky, and Ziganshin shortly after being rescued

- Four Russian soldiers who had been adrift in the Pacific Ocean since January 17 were rescued after a 49-day drift in the ocean. The American aircraft carrier USS Kearsarge picked up the four — Sgt. Askhat 'Victor' Ziganshin and his men, Filipp Poplavsky, Anatoly Kryuchkovsky, and Ivan Fedotov — who had survived seven weeks.
- The 14,000-member Screen Actors Guild called a strike for the first time in its history, bringing to a halt the filming of eight major motion pictures and several minor ones.
- The first 20 Soviet cosmonauts were selected in preparation for crewed spaceflight.
- Born:
  - Ivan Lendl, Czech pro tennis player (French, U.S. and Australian open champion); in Ostrava, Czechoslovakia
  - Joe Carter, American MLB outfielder; in Oklahoma City

== March 8, 1960 (Tuesday) ==
- The New Hampshire primary, first of the nominating primary elections, saw U.S. Senator John F. Kennedy win the state's Democratic Party delegates, and U.S. Vice-President Richard M. Nixon win on the Republican ticket, each with a record number of registered voters from their parties. Other major candidates had declined to participate in New Hampshire. Kennedy defeated Chicago businessman Paul Fisher, 42,969 to 6,784 and Nixon's 65,077 votes were matched by write-ins for four candidates, including 8,428 for New Hampshire governor Wesley Powell.

== March 9, 1960 (Wednesday) ==
- The Scribner shunt, a flexible Teflon tube that could be permanently implanted to connect an artery to a vein, was first implanted into a human patient. For the first time, persons with kidney failure could receive dialysis on a regular basis. Prior to the shunt's invention by Dr. Belding H. Scribner, glass tubes had to be inserted into blood vessels every time that dialysis was given. As one observer noted, "Scribner took something that was 100% fatal and overnight turned it into a condition with a 90% survival." The historic operation took place at the University of Washington hospital, and 39-year-old machinist Clyde Shields was the first beneficiary. At the same time, a new issue in bioethics was created, since decisions had to be made about which patients would be selected to receive the lifesaving treatment.
- The journal Physical Review Letters received the paper "Apparent Weight of Photons" from physicists Robert V. Pound and Glen A. Rebka, Jr., reporting the first successful laboratory measurement of the gravitational redshift of light, described later as a key event in proving the theory of general relativity.
- Position titles for Project Mercury operational flights were issued. During the flights, 15 major positions were assigned to Mercury Control Center, 15 in the blockhouse and 2 at the launch pad area. The document also specified the duties and responsibilities of each position.
- Died:
  - U.S. Senator Richard L. Neuberger, 47, a Democrat representing Oregon, died of a cerebral hemorrhage one day after having a stroke at his home. On the day of his fatal stroke, a newspaper columnist had noted that he apparently had no challenger for the upcoming general election and "may get a virtually free pass for another six-year term." His widow, Maurine Neuberger, had only two days to file as a candidate in the Democratic primary, and would be elected as U.S. Senator in 1960, serving until 1967.
  - Jack Beattie, 75, Northern Ireland Labour Party leader, 1929–1933 and 1942–2943

== March 10, 1960 (Thursday) ==
- The first mitral valve replacement was performed on a 16-year-old girl, who had implanted in her a prosthesis, made of polyurethane and Dacron, and designed by Drs. Nina Braunwald and Andrew Morrow. The girl survived the operation, but died 60 hours later. The next day, a 44-year-old woman received the valve and made a full recovery eight weeks later.
- The first implantation of the caged ball heart valve, developed by Drs. Dwight E. Harken and William C. Birtwell, was made on Mary Richardson, who survived for 30 years after the surgery.
- Eight people were pulled alive from the rubble of Agadir, ten days after the deadly earthquake that had killed 12,000 people in Morocco.

== March 11, 1960 (Friday) ==
- At five seconds after 8:00 a.m., EST, Pioneer V was launched from Cape Canaveral as the third man-made object to become a "planetoid" in solar orbit. Unlike the Soviet and American probes launched previously, Pioneer V would orbit between the Earth and Venus. The probe began to provide invaluable information on solar flare effects, particle energies and distributions and magnetic phenomena. Pioneer V continued to transmit such data until on June 26, 1960, when at a distance of 22.5 million miles from Earth, it established a new communications record.
- The initial payment was made to the Australian Government by the Chase National Bank, New York City, on behalf of the National Aeronautics and Space Administration for support of the Mercury network.
- Died: Roy Chapman Andrews, 76, American explorer, adventurer and naturalist

== March 12, 1960 (Saturday) ==
- At the age of 21, Prince Constantine Bereng Seeiso of Basutoland (later Lesotho) formally became the Paramount Chief, and, upon the African nation's independence from the United Kingdom in 1966, King Moshoeshoe II of Lesotho. He reigned until his death in an auto accident in 1996.

== March 13, 1960 (Sunday) ==
- Author Ian Fleming was a dinner guest at the home of future American president John F. Kennedy, and described to the assemblage some humorous suggestions for how James Bond would get rid of Fidel Castro, including causing Castro's beard to fall out. CIA official John Bross, another dinner guest, called agency director Allen Dulles afterward and reported Fleming's "ideas", some of which were tried later.
- A total lunar eclipse afforded astrophysicist Richard W. Shorthill the opportunity to make the first infrared pyrometric scans of the lunar surface and led to his discovery of the first lunar "hot spot" observed from Earth. Shorthill found that the temperature of the floor of the Tycho crater was 216° Kelvin (—57 °C), significantly higher than the 160K (—113 °C) in the area around the crater.
- Maurizio Pollini won the VI International Chopin Piano competition, marking the first time that the prize had gone to an Italian pianist.
- Born:
  - Joe Ranft, American animator and voice actor; in Pasadena (killed in auto accident, 2005)
  - Adam Clayton, Irish rock bassist for U2; in Chinnor, Oxfordshire, England
  - Luciano Ligabue, Italian singer-songwriter and film director; in Correggio

== March 14, 1960 (Monday) ==
- USAF Col. William Burke, aide to Richard M. Bissell Jr., who oversaw the CIA's U-2 spy plane program, warned Bissell that the Soviets had developed the missile capability to shoot down the high-altitude (70,000-foot (21,000 m)) U-2. Nevertheless, the spy flights continued, and on May 1, 1960, a U-2 would be downed in Soviet territory.
- West German Chancellor Konrad Adenauer met with Israeli prime minister David Ben-Gurion at the Waldorf-Astoria Hotel in New York City, the first time a German leader had conferred with a leader of the Jewish state. Two weeks earlier, the two countries had secretly negotiated German financial and military aid to Israel.
- Born: Kirby Puckett, Minnesota Twins outfielder and Hall of Famer; in Chicago (d. 2006)

== March 15, 1960 (Tuesday) ==
- Government forces in Masan, South Korea, arrested students protesting against rigged elections. Although President Syngman Rhee's re-election to a fourth term had been ensured when his opponent died of an illness, separate elections for vice-president would determine the 85-year-old Rhee's successor. With the aid of government measures, including the stuffing of ballot boxes, Rhee's running mate, Lee Ki Poong, officially received 79.2% of the votes in what was expected to be a close race against opponent Chang Myun. Over the next weeks, students in other cities followed the example of Masan, and Rhee was forced to resign.
- Police in Orangeburg, South Carolina arrested 389 African-American protesters who had converged upon the town's lunch counters at the noon hour. Meanwhile, in Atlanta, 77 students were arrested after beginning sit-ins at government offices.
- West German Chancellor Konrad Adenauer met at the White House with U.S. President Eisenhower to discuss the Berlin crisis.
- In Geneva, the first session of the Ten Nation Committee on Disarmament was held.

== March 16, 1960 (Wednesday) ==
- At a cave in Starved Rock State Park near Ottawa, Illinois, the bodies of three women were found. All three, residents of Riverside, Illinois, and the wealthy wives of Chicago business executives, had been beaten to death two days before, during an afternoon of birdwatching. A dishwasher at the park later confessed to killing the women after attempting to rob them. Chester Weger, convicted of the murder, was sentenced to life imprisonment, and would remain incarcerated until being paroled in 2020.
- Robert Sobukwe, leader of the Pan Africanist Congress, gave advance notice to South Africa's police commissioner that, beginning on March 21, the PAC would stage five days of non-violent protests against national laws that required all black South Africans to carry passes. What was intended as a peaceful demonstration would become the Sharpeville Massacre.
- In Argentina, due to a wave of terrorism (330 attacks and 21 victims in five months), President Arturo Frondizi took severe measures against the Peronist opposition. Hundreds of Peronist militants were arrested (including former Foreign Minister Ildefonso Cavagna Martinez), and martial law was decreed against the terrorists.
- Jean-Luc Godard's Breathless was released in four Paris cinemas. The movie, the directorial debut for Goddard and starring actor Jean-Paul Belmondo in his first lead role, reached the top of the box-office in France in the first week. Belmondo would repeat the public success the following week, with The Big Risk.
- Born:
  - Rick Nowels, American songwriter, record producer, multi-instrumentalist and arranger; in San Francisco, California
  - John Hemming, British Liberal Democrat politician and businessman; in Birmingham
  - Jenny Eclair, British comedian; in Kuala Lumpur, Malaysia
- Died: Gérard Saint, 24, French cyclist, was killed in a car accident in Le Mans.

== March 17, 1960 (Thursday) ==
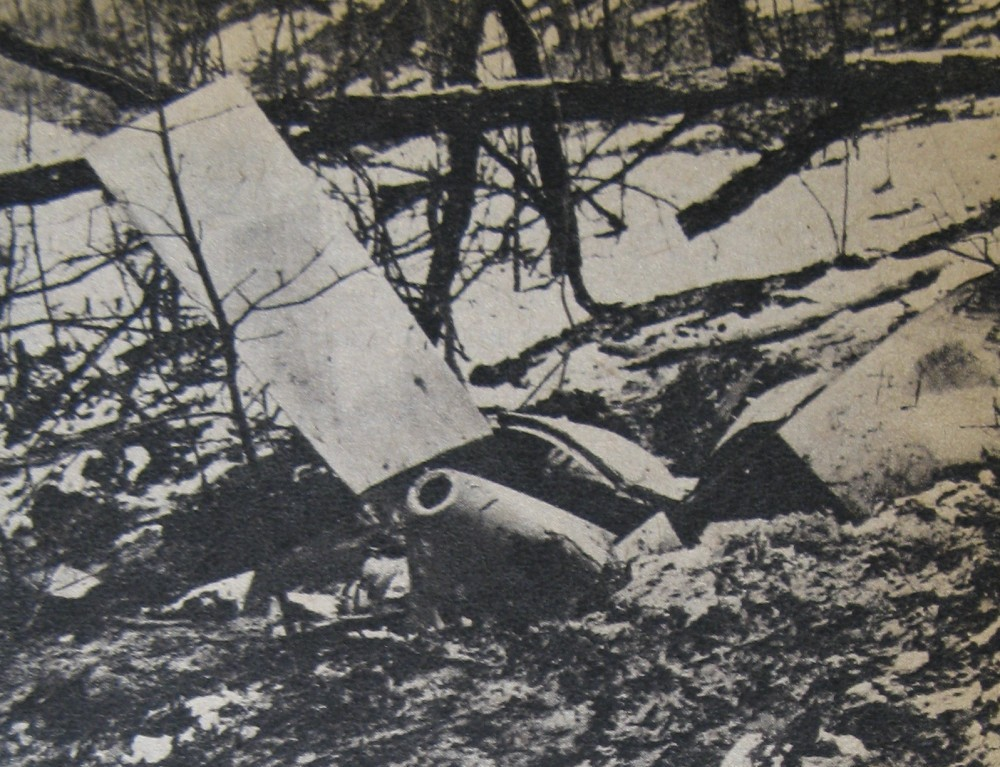
Wreckage of Northwest Orient Airlines Flight 710

- Northwest Orient Airlines Flight 710 crashed, killing all 63 people on board. The wings fell off the Lockheed L-188 Electra turboprop airplane at an altitude of 18,000 feet (5,500 m) while the flight was en route from Chicago to Miami, and crashed into a soybean field near Cannelton, Indiana at 4:20 p.m., leaving a 12-foot-deep (3.7 m) crater.
- Following a 2:30 meeting at the White House with Allen Dulles and Richard Bissell of the CIA, U.S. President Eisenhower authorized the agency to train and equip Cuban exiles to overthrow the regime of Fidel Castro, an operation which would become, in 1961, the Bay of Pigs Invasion.
- Sculptor Jean Tinguely introduced the first piece of "autodestructive art" at New York's Museum of Modern Art. Homage to New York, composed of bicycle wheels and motors, was activated at 6:30 p.m. and destroyed itself within an hour.
- Gina Lollobrigida declared to the press that she and her husband Milko Skofic would leave Italy for Canada. They meant to solve the legal situation of their son Andrea Milko, considered stateless by the Italian bureaucracy.
- Born: Pietro Scalia, Italian-born American film editor and Academy Award winner known for JFK and Black Hawk Down; in Catania

== March 18, 1960 (Friday) ==
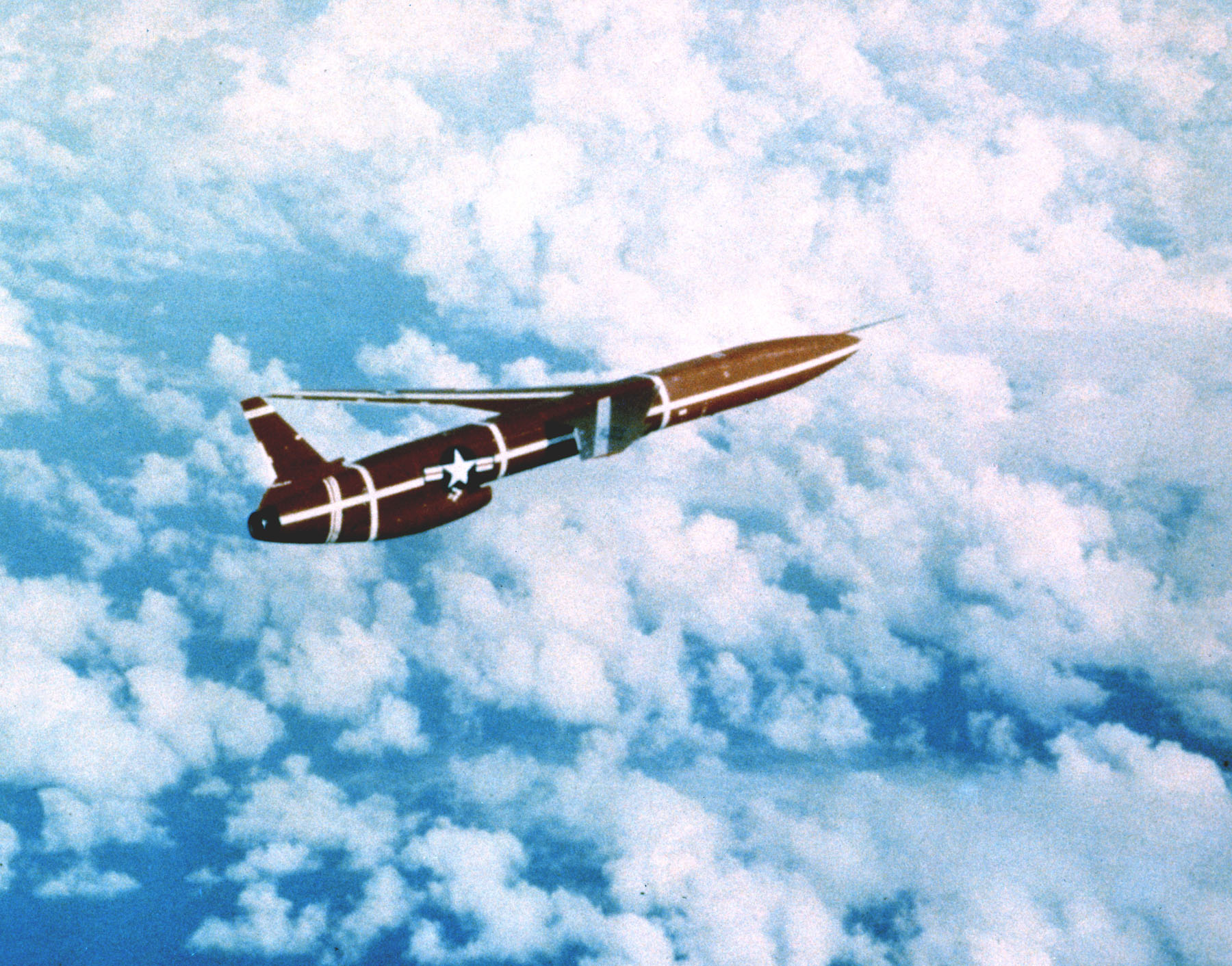
The Snark

- The "Snark missile" began its brief service as a nuclear-tipped American ICBM. Designed by Northrop and named after the Lewis Carroll poem, "The Hunting of the Snark", the 30 missiles were deployed at Presque Isle Air Force Base in Maine as part of the 702d Strategic Missile Wing. Fifteen months later, the Snarks were declared to be obsolete, and deactivated by order of President Kennedy.
- The Soviet Academy of Science gave names for the first time to craters discovered on the far side of the Moon by Luna 3. A list was published in Pravda, the official newspaper of the Soviet Communist Party, of 12 landmarks not visible from the Earth. The persons honored, only four (Dmitri Mendeleev, Igor Kurchatov, Nikolai Lobachevsky, and Alexander Popov) of whom were Russian, included Louis Pasteur, Marie Sklodowska-Curie (honored with the crater Sklodowska), James C. Maxwell, Heinrich Hertz, Tsu Chung-Chi, Giordano Bruno, inventor Thomas Edison and science fiction writer Jules Verne.
- In France, President Charles De Gaulle refused to summon an extraordinary session of the National Assembly about the agricultural crisis, as requested by 287 MPs. De Gaulle's authoritarian move was harshly criticized by the press and almost all the political parties.

== March 19, 1960 (Saturday) ==
- Voting was held in Ceylon (now Sri Lanka) for the 151 seats of the House of Representatives, with no party receiving the 76 necessary for a majority. Prime Minister Wijayananda Dahanayake, who had resigned from the ruling Sri Lanka Freedom Party (SLFP) to form the Lanka Democratic Party headed a field of 101 candidates, of whom 97 failed to win a seat in the election. The United National Party (UNP), which had won only 8 seats in the 1956 election, won 50 seats for a plurality, allowing Dudley Senanayake to form a new government with the SFLP a close second holding 46 seats. Senanayake's coalition did not last new elections would take place in July.
- A portion of the Great Wall of China was opened for visitors after repairs that had first been suggested in 1952 by Guo Moruo, an official in the Communist Chinese government. The section near Badaling was originally set aside for visits by foreign diplomats, and its first guest was Nepal's foreign minister. In 1972, television viewers in the West would see the wall at Badaling during a visit by President Nixon of the United States, and the area is now open to tourists.
- Dallas Rangers general manager Tex Schramm announced that the new NFL team was going to change its name to avoid a conflict with the minor league baseball team of the same name. "It seems Dallas is becoming big league in baseball as well as in football", Schram said, "and since both 'Rangers' will be around here for a long time, and since the baseball club had the name first, we're changing ours." The new name selected was the Dallas Cowboys.
- In La Paz, Bolivia, the far-right movement Bolivian Socialist Falange attempted an insurrection, led by the colonel of the carabineers Hermogenes Rio Ledezma. The Bolivian president Hermàn Siles Zuazo reacted firmly. At sunset, the riot was quelled, and Rio Ledezma was forced to flee.
- The University of Denver won the 1960 NCAA ice hockey championship, 5–3 over Michigan Tech, after John MacMillan scored two goals in the final 63 seconds of the game.
- Ohio State University won the NCAA basketball championship by upsetting the defending champion, the University of California, 75–55.
- An agreement between the United States and Spain on the Project Mercury tracking station in the Canary Islands was announced.

== March 20, 1960 (Sunday) ==
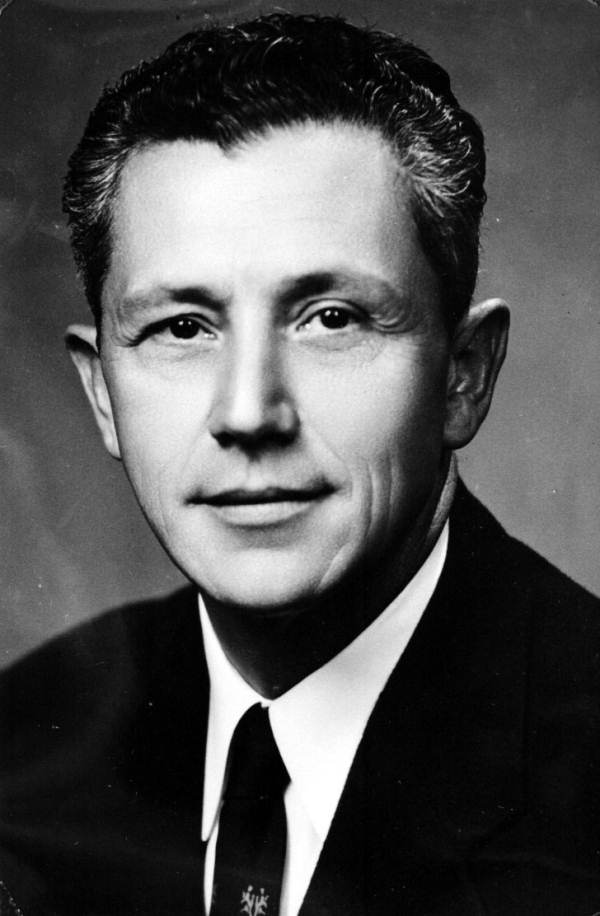
Governor Collins

- LeRoy Collins, the Governor of Florida, surprised the state and the rest of the world in a televised speech. Though he had been a defender of Florida's segregation laws, Governor Collins endorsed the goal of sit-in demonstrations to allow African-Americans to eat at lunch counters. "People have told me that our racial strife could be eliminated if the colored people would just stay in their place," said the Governor, "but friends, we can never stop Americans from struggling to be free."
- The Soviet Union's Council of Ministers adopted Resolution 241, directing urgent government funding for the oil exploration in western Siberia.
- Born: Norm Magnusson, American artist, founder of "funism"

== March 21, 1960 (Monday) ==
- The Sharpeville Massacre began at 1:20 p.m. when white police at the South African township of Sharpeville fired their guns into a crowd of unarmed black protesters, killing 69 people and wounding 180. Subsequent investigations would determine that two policemen had fired their guns, and that 50 others then began shooting into the crowd as they fled. Within 40 seconds, 705 rounds were fired. Of 155 bullets extracted from the dead and wounded, only 30 were frontal entry wounds. Most of the victims had been shot in the back as they ran. Of the dead, 31 were women, and 19 were children. Since the end of white minority rule, South Africa observes Human Rights Day annually on March 21.
- In Buenos Aires, Ricardo Klement brought a bouquet of flowers to his wife at their home at 16 Garibaldi Street, confirming to Mossad agents that the Argentine businessman was, as they suspected, Nazi war criminal Adolf Eichmann. The Israeli intelligence service was aware that Eichmann had married on March 21, 1935, while Eichmann was unaware that he had been found after 15 years on the run. The architect of Germany's "Final Solution" genocide, Eichmann eluded capture after the end of World War II. In May, he would be abducted and brought to Israel to stand trial.
- Born: Ayrton Senna, Brazilian race car driver, three time Formula One champion; in São Paulo (died at the San Marino Grand Prix, 1994)
- Died: Polly Thomson, 75, American therapist who served as the interpreter for Helen Keller after the death of Anne Sullivan in 1936.

== March 22, 1960 (Tuesday) ==
- Arthur Leonard Schawlow and Charles H. Townes of Bell Labs received U.S. Patent No. 2,929,922 for an optical maser, now more commonly referred to as the laser. Other scientists, including Gordon Gould, were working on their own discoveries for "light amplification by stimulated emission of radiation", and legal battles between Gould and Bell Labs continued for 28 years.
- In Garden City, Kansas, the trial of Richard Hickock and Perry Edward Smith for the Clutter family murders began. The two were convicted on March 29 and sentenced to death. They would be executed on April 14, 1965.
- Died: José Antonio Aguirre, 56, leader-in-exile (Lehendakari) of the Basque people of Spain

== March 23, 1960 (Wednesday) ==
- Abel Bonnard, who had served as the Minister of Education in the Government of Vichy France during the Nazi German occupation in World War II, returned from exile in Spain to his home nation, hoping for rehabilitation of his reputation and forgiveness of his 1945 death sentence in absentia. The death sentence was commuted to the symbolic punishment of "ten years of exile already served" but Bonnard's expulsion from the Academie Francaise was not changed.
- Marty Dalton, who had been an inmate of the Rhode Island State Prison in Cranston, Rhode Island for almost 63 years since his 1897 arrest for the murder of a New York businessman, died at the prison infirmary. Dalton had refused parole in 1930 after serving 33 years. After a two-hour tour of the outside world, he asked to stay because the prison was his only home.
- In Paris, Soviet Premier and Communist Party General Secretary Nikita Khrushchev began a ten-day state visit to France and was welcomed at the Orly airport by French president Charles de Gaulle. The welcome by the Parisians to the guest was mainly cordial, but with some anti-communist protest.
- The city of La Mirada, California, was incorporated as "Mirada Hills".
- Born: Nicol Stephen, Leader of Scottish Liberal Democrats from 2005 to 2008; in Aberdeen
- Died:
  - Franklin P. Adams, 78, American humorist and newspaper columnist who was universally known as "FPA"
  - Said Nursî, 81, Islamic philosopher

== March 24, 1960 (Thursday) ==
- The Tupolev Tu-124 jet airliner, first ever to be powered by turbofans, made its first flight, at the test grounds in the Soviet Russian city of Zhukovsky. The Tu-124s were then manufactured in Kharkov, and were primarily used by Aeroflot and other Communist-bloc airlines.
- Henry de Montherlant was elected to the Académie Française. Some academics did not take part in the vote because of Montherlant's ambiguous attitude during the German occupation of France.
- Born:
  - Nena (stage name for Gabriele Susanne Kerner), German singer known for the song "99 Luftballons"; in Hagen, Nordrhein-Westfalen, West Germany
  - Giorgio Gori, Italian TV journalist and mayor of Bergamo during the COVID crisis; in Bergamo

== March 25, 1960 (Friday) ==
- Fernando Tambroni, who had been minister of the treasury, became the new prime minister of Italy, forming a cabinet of ministers composed exclusively of Christian Democrats. Antonio Segni, who had been prime minister until his government collapsed, became the new foreign minister. Future prime ministers who served in the Tambroni Cabinet were Industry and Commerce Minister, Emilio Colombo, Agriculture Minister Mariano Rumor and Defense Minister Giulio Andreotti. Tambroni's "administrative cabinet", without a predetermined majority in parliament, was aimed at guaranteeing the approval of the new budget to meet the expenses of the Summer Olympic Games. Tambroni and his cabinet would resign on July 19.
- The severed head of Oliver Cromwell, Lord Protector of the Commonwealth of England, Scotland and Ireland from 1653 to 1658, was reburied in an undisclosed location at Sidney Sussex College, Cambridge after 300 years. Cromwell's body had been unearthed after his death in 1659, with the head displayed on a spike and the rest of the corpse dumped in the sea. After being passed among several owners, the head had been kept by several generations of a family since 1815.
- The Euromast, a 101 m (331 ft) structure designed by Hugh Maaskant, was dedicated in Rotterdam by Princess (and future Queen) Beatrix of the Netherlands.
- Died: Arturo Ambrosio, 89, Italian producer and pioneer of cinema

== March 26, 1960 (Saturday) ==
- In Brazil, the Oros Dam on the Jaguaribe River in the state of Ceará, nearing completion, collapsed because of torrential rains and inundated the city of Jaguaribe and the village of Mapua, both of which had been evacuated earlier. The Brazilian Army had evacuated 100,000 people from the river valley starting on March 22. While thousands of people were left homeless, the death toll from the damburst was 32 people.
- At the 12-hour endurance event at Sebring, Florida, race car driver Jim Hughes lost control of his car 23 minutes after the start, and his car rolled over onto George Thompson, a photographer for the Tampa Tribune. Both men were killed. Olivier Gendebien, who had alternated with Hans Hermann, won the race.
- The Minneapolis Lakers played their last NBA game, losing in Game 7 of the Western Conference playoffs, 97–86, to the St. Louis Hawks. The Lakers would move to Los Angeles during the off-season.
- Various Ku Klux Klan groups burned crosses along highways in Alabama and South Carolina, apparently in retaliation for sit-ins by African-Americans at lunch counters.
- Born:
  - Jennifer Grey, American film and television actress, known for Ferris Bueller's Day Off and Dirty Dancing, and later for Dancing with the Stars; in Manhattan
  - Jon Huntsman Jr., 16th Governor of Utah from 2005 to 2009, U.S. Ambassador to Russia from 2017 to 2019; in Redwood City
  - Marcus Allen, American NFL player and Hall of Famer; in San Diego
- Died:
  - Dr. Emil Grubbe, 85, the first person to be injured by radiation. After following Roentgen's work in x-rays in 1895, Grubbe had undergone 93 operations for radiation-induced cancer on his hands and face. The report of his death noted that "Burned by X-rays in the fall of 1895, Dr. Grubbe was the earliest known victim of man-made radiation. He later said that his radiation burns, which crippled and disfigured him, provided the idea of using radiation for therapeutic purposes."
  - Ian Keith, 61, American stage and film actor, died from a heart attack and a perforated duodenal ulcer. He had been performing in a leading role in the Broadway play The Andersonville Trial the evening before being stricken by the cardiac arrest while dining.

== March 27, 1960 (Sunday) ==
- Four students at St. Mary's University, Texas— Orion Knox, Jr., Al Brandt, Preston Knodell and Jo Cantu— discovered the Natural Bridge Caverns in Comal County, Texas. As the largest known cave system in that state, the caverns are now a tourist attraction.
- The last regularly scheduled service in America of a passenger train powered by a steam engine took place when Grand Trunk Western Railroad ran a steam locomotive for the last time, on a route between Detroit and Durand, Michigan.
- Born: Hans Pflügler, German National Team footballer; in Freising

== March 28, 1960 (Monday) ==
- In the worst peacetime loss of life in the history of British firefighting, 19 people were killed while responding to a fire in Glasgow, 14 of whom were Scottish firefighters with the Glasgow Fire Service and five with the Glasgow Salvage Corps.
- Four days of training for "open-water egress" (i.e., being able to escape from a space capsule that landed in the ocean) began for the Mercury astronauts received their first open-water egress training in the Gulf of Mexico off the coast of Pensacola, Florida, in cooperation with the U.S. Navy's School of Aviation Medicine. The training was conducted in conditions of up to 10-foot (3.0 m) swells. The average egress time was about 4 minutes from a completely restrained condition in the spacecraft to being in the life raft.
- Died: Russell V. Mack (R-WA), 68, U.S. Representative from Washington's 3rd congressional district, collapsed and died on the floor of the House of Representatives, apparently of a cerebral hemorrhage. The House had been completing a call for a quorum when Mack fell backward and struck his head on a seat. Three U.S. representatives who were also physicians—Thomas E. Morgan (D-PA), Dale Alford (D-AR), and Walter Judd (R-MN)—attempted to render aid. The Attending Physician of the United States Congress, Dr. George W. Calver, pronounced Mack dead a few minutes later.

== March 29, 1960 (Tuesday) ==
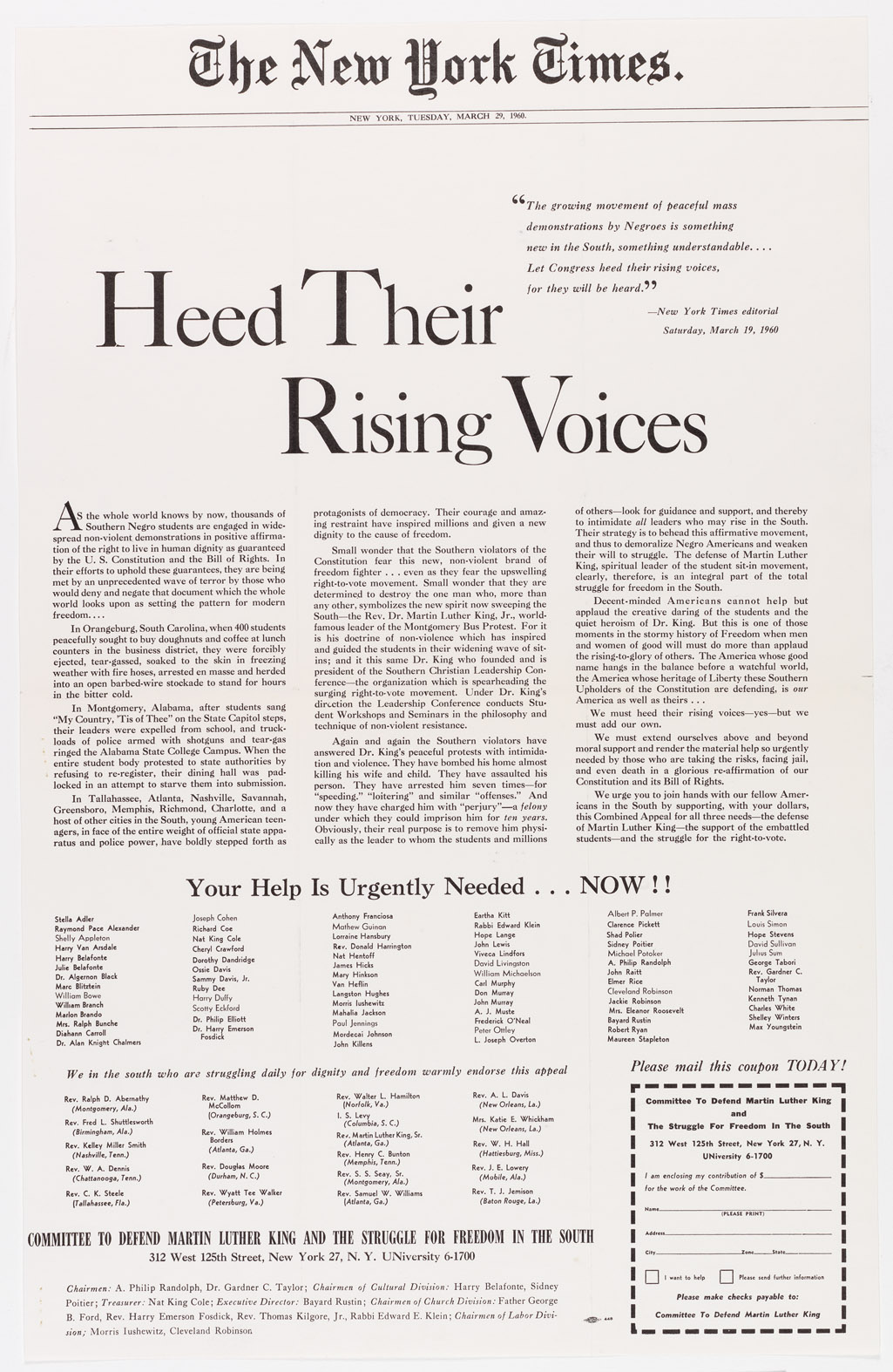
"Heed Their Rising Voices"

- The New York Times ran a full-page advertisement on page L25, with the heading "Heed Their Rising Voices". Part of the ad referred to disturbances in Montgomery, Alabama, and described actions by that city's police. One of the three City Commissioners of Montgomery, L. B. Sullivan, would bring a suit against the Times for libel and get a $500,000 judgment in an Alabama court. From the controversy came a landmark United States Supreme Court ruling in New York Times Co. v. Sullivan, 376 U.S. 254 (1964).
- NASA Headquarters decided that the spacecraft pre-launch operation facility at Huntsville, Alabama, was no longer required. Spacecraft designated for Mercury-Redstone missions were to be shipped directly from McDonnell to Cape Canaveral, thereby gaining approximately 2 months in the launch schedule.
- Dr. Melvin A. Cook received the first patent for a water-based explosive product. The water gel, slurry, and emulsion explosive was less sensitive to impact and shock, and safer than dynamite when used in industrial applications.
- "Tom Pillibi", sung by 18-year-old Jacqueline Boyer (music by André Popp, lyrics by Pierre Cour), won the Eurovision Song Contest 1960 for France.

== March 30, 1960 (Wednesday) ==
- A state of emergency was proclaimed in South Africa by Prime Minister Hendrik Verwoerd at 3:00 a.m., nine days after the Sharpeville Massacre, and the government began arresting dissidents. On the same day, thirty thousand black South Africans marched through Cape Town in protest of the internal passport law required for non-white South Africans, as well as the massacre, and the arrest of black leaders.
- In the United States, 5,000 black Americans marched through Baton Rouge, the state capital of Louisiana, in protest against discrimination at lunch counters and arrests of protesters by the police.
- Died: Jamil Mardam Bey, 65, Prime Minister of Syria from 1936 to 1939 and from 1946 to 1958

== March 31, 1960 (Thursday) ==
- Several hundred political prisoners, incarcerated since the Hungarian Revolution of 1956, were released as part of the second amnesty of the Kadar regime, including playwright Gyula Háy and novelist Tibor Dery.
