= April 1960 =

Month of 1960

| << | April 1960 | | | | | >> |
| Su | Mo | Tu | We | Th | Fr | Sa |
| | | | | | 1 | 2 |
| 3 | 4 | 5 | 6 | 7 | 8 | 9 |
| 10 | 11 | 12 | 13 | 14 | 15 | 16 |
| 17 | 18 | 19 | 20 | 21 | 22 | 23 |
| 24 | 25 | 26 | 27 | 28 | 29 | 30 |

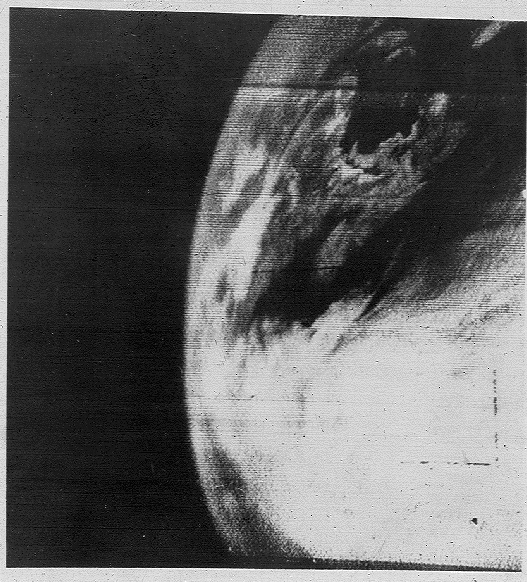
April 1, 1960: TIROS I opens era of satellite weather images

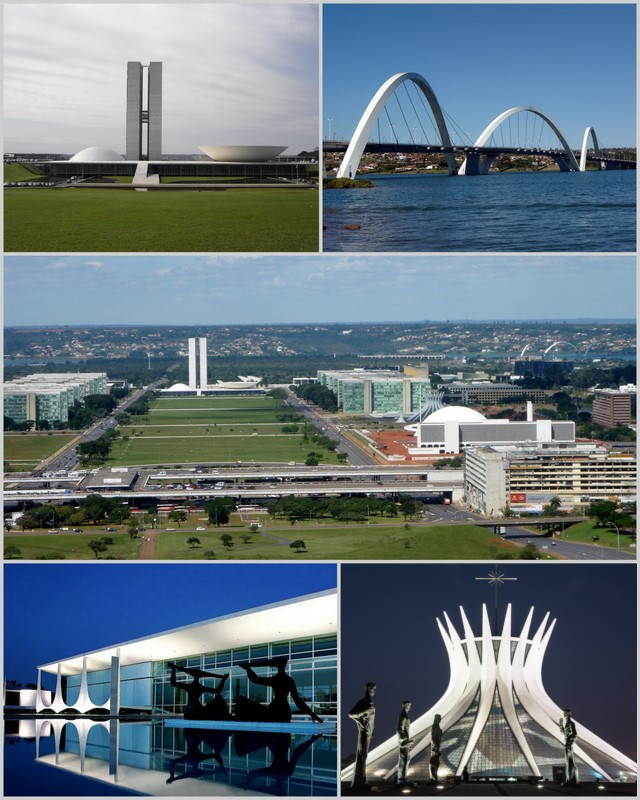
April 21, 1960: The new city of Brasília is dedicated

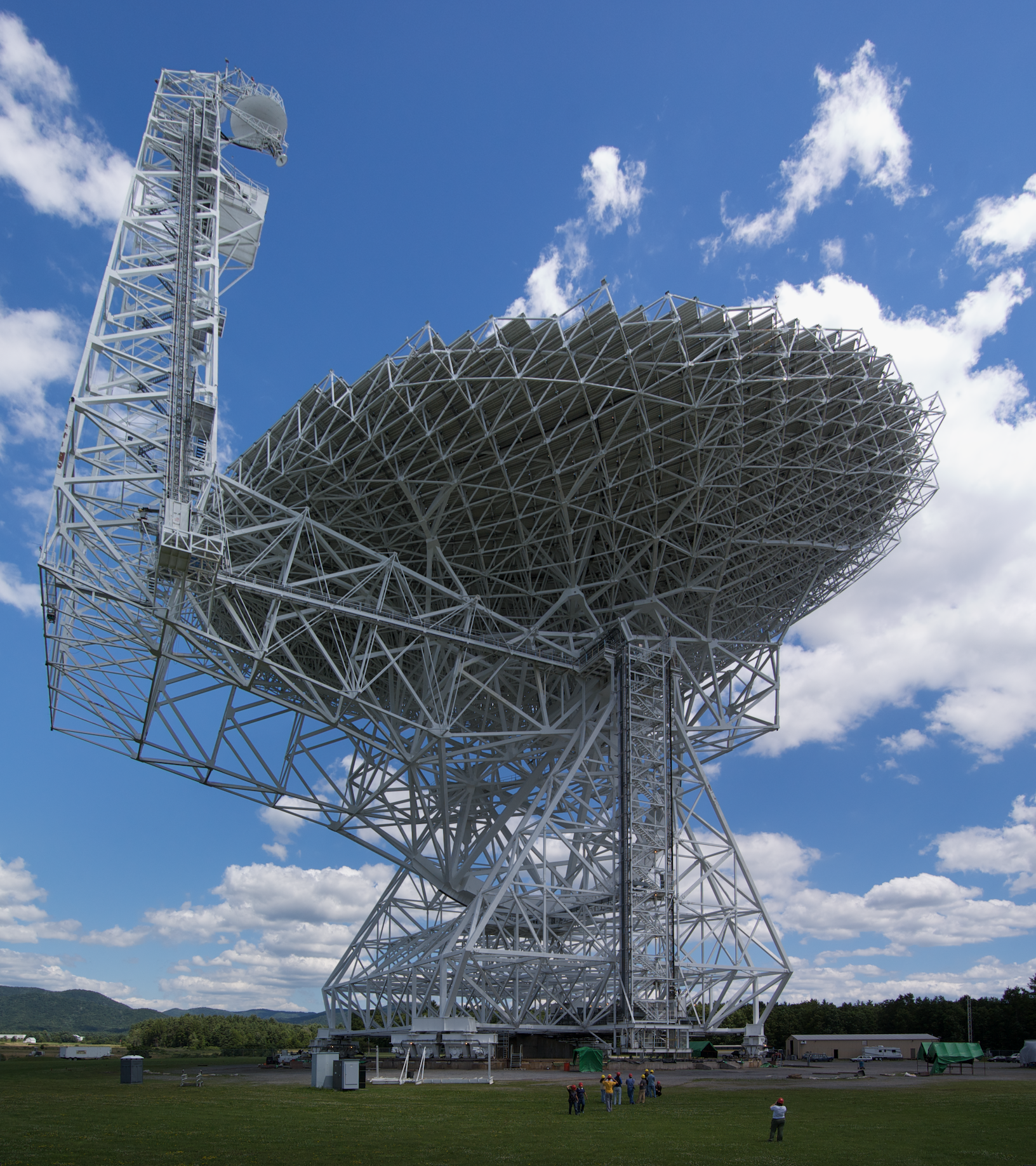
April 8, 1960: Radio telescope picks up signals from Epsilon Eridani

The following events occurred in April 1960:

== April 1, 1960 (Friday) ==
- The United States launched the first weather satellite, the 270-pound (120 kg) TIROS-1, from Cape Canaveral at 6:40 a.m. EST. The name was an acronym for Television Infra-Red Observation Satellite. The same evening, satellite weather photos were introduced to the world, on television, for the first time. Taken from an altitude of 450 miles (720 km), the pictures of cloud cover confirmed the spiral pattern of winds in a storm.
- The 1960 United States census began. Officially, there were 179,323,175 United States residents on that day.
- R Griggs & Co. began the production of Dr. Martens boots under licence in the UK. Known as style 1460, the original product is still in production today.
- The first McDonnell production Mercury spacecraft was delivered to NASA at Wallops Island for the beach-abort test.
- Died: Abdul Rahman of Negeri Sembilan, 64, the first Yang di-Pertuan Agong of Malaysia; in office

== April 2, 1960 (Saturday) ==
- A treaty was signed by France and nationalists in Madagascar, assuring the independence of the Malagasy Republic, which followed in June of the same year.
- Yvon Chouinard and Tom Frost opened a new chapter in climbing history by ascending the vertical Kat Pinnacle at Yosemite National Park with a newly designed type of piton.
- Sikiru Kayode Adetona was crowned as Ogbagba Anikilaya II, the Awujale of Ijebuland. As of 2012, Adetona was the longest ruling of the traditional Nigeria monarchs.
- South African Police at Cape Town stopped several thousand black marchers as they approached the city from the direction of Nyanga.
- Born: Linford Christie, Jamaican-born British track athlete who won the 1992 Olympic gold medal and the 1993 world championships in the 100 meter dash; in Saint Andrew Parish, Jamaica

== April 3, 1960 (Sunday) ==
- The Charismatic Movement, also referred to as the "Charismatic Renewal", began when Episcopal Priest Dennis Bennett told his congregation at St. Mark's in Van Nuys, California, that he had experienced Spirit baptism accompanied by speaking in tongues. The media soon covered the event as the intrusion of Pentecostalism into a main line church.
- Born: Marie Denise Pelletier, Canadian singer; in Montreal
- Died: Norodom Suramarit, 64, King of Cambodia since 1955. He had been preceded by, and was succeeded by, his son Norodom Sihanouk.

== April 4, 1960 (Monday) ==
- Elections in Burma resulted in victory for U Nu, who began his third non-consecutive term as prime minister.
- Senegal signed a transfer of power agreement with France, leading up to the country's independence.
- At the 32nd Academy Awards ceremony, Ben-Hur won a record eleven Oscars, including Best Picture.
- Sweden's first three female priests were ordained.
- Born: Hugo Weaving, Nigerian-born Australian actor; in Ibadan

== April 5, 1960 (Tuesday) ==
- Choosing between two U.S. Senators, voters in Wisconsin overwhelmingly favored John F. Kennedy of Massachusetts over Hubert Humphrey from neighboring Minnesota, by a margin of 478,118 to 372,034 in the first major primary for the Democratic nomination. Vice-President Nixon was unopposed for the Republican nomination.
- The name for Oakland, California's new pro football team was announced. The Oakland Señors were renamed the "Raiders" nine days later.
- The Space Task Group (STG) notified the Ames Research Center that preliminary planning for the modification of the Mercury spacecraft to accomplish controlled reentry had begun, and that preliminary specifications for a modified spacecraft, capable of carrying two astronauts rather than one, were to be ready by the end of the month. The program would be called the "Mercury Mark II project" and eventually Project Gemini.
- Died: Peter Llewelyn Davies, 63, whom J. M. Barrie, had identified as the inspiration for the name of Peter Pan, committed suicide.

== April 6, 1960 (Wednesday) ==
- Alberto Lleras Camargo, the President of Colombia, addressed a joint session of Congress as part of a 13-day state visit to the United States. Lleras was given a ticker-tape parade in New York on April 11.
- The Short SC.1 VTOL aircraft made its first transition from vertical to horizontal flight and back.

== April 7, 1960 (Thursday) ==
- Under the Unlawful Organisations Act No. 34, the African National Congress and Pan Africanist Congress parties were banned in South Africa. This resulted in the formation of "Umkonto we Sizwe" ("Spear of the Nation"), the guerrilla wing of the ANC, by Nelson Mandela and others.
- In an event described as "unique in world postal history", the governments of 70 nations simultaneously issued stamps to commemorate World Refugee Year.

== April 8, 1960 (Friday) ==
- Project Ozma, under the direction of astronomer Frank Drake at the National Radio Astronomy Observatory, in Green Bank, West Virginia, commenced and was the first modern Search for extraterrestrial intelligence (SETI) experiment. After detecting nothing from Tau Ceti, Drake steered the telescope toward Epsilon Eridani and picked up signals at precisely eight times per second. As rumors spread that the Project had picked up signs of intelligent life, Drake was forced to say that he had no comment. The source was later traced to an airplane.
- West Germany and the Netherlands signed a border agreement to restore land taken during the Dutch annexation of German territory after World War II. Germany agreed to pay DM 280,000,000 for the return of Elten, Selfkant (Zelfkant), and Suderwick (Zuiderwijk) and as reparations (Wiedergutmachung).
- Construction of an altitude facility chamber to simulate space environment was completed in Hangar S at Cape Canaveral. The purpose of this facility was for spacecraft checkout and astronaut training. Acceptance tests for this installation were completed on July 11, 1960.

== April 9, 1960 (Saturday) ==
- South Africa's Prime Minister Hendrik Verwoerd was shot and seriously wounded by David Pratt, a white farmer, in Johannesburg. Verwoerd survived, but would be stabbed to death in 1966.
- The Boston Celtics won the NBA championship, beating the St. Louis Hawks 122–103. The Hawks had forced a seventh game two days earlier by beating Boston 105–102.

== April 10, 1960 (Sunday) ==
- The last successful American U-2 overflight of the Soviet Union took place, as a pilot passed near the missile range at Tyuratam. The S-75 Dvina missile batteries that could have downed the plane had not been alerted of the intrusion in time, and several Soviet senior commanders were fired. On May 1, a U-2 plane flown by Francis Gary Powers would be struck down.

== April 11, 1960 (Monday) ==
- A fisherman in Masan in South Korea, discovered the mutilated body of Kim Chu Yol, a high school student who had been killed during March protests against the fraudulent presidential election. A police tear gas shell was visible in Kim's eye socket, and the outrage against the government's brutality triggered a riot. The violence in Masan was then followed by rioting in other South Korean cities.
- For Your Eyes Only, Ian Fleming's eighth James Bond novel, was first published by Jonathan Cape.

== April 12, 1960 (Tuesday) ==
- The International Court of Justice, more popularly known as the World Court, resolved a dispute between Portugal and India after more than four years, in Portugal's favor, ruling 11–4 that Portuguese officials could cross over India's territory to reach its colonies in Goa, Daman and Diu. The victory was short-lived, as India annexed all three territories the following year.
- Candlestick Park, described by one source as "the windiest, coldest, and the most hated baseball stadium in the history of the game", opened in San Francisco, and began a 40-season run as the home of the San Francisco Giants. U.S. Vice-President (and Republican presidential candidate) Richard Nixon threw out the first pitch.
- Eric Peugeot, the four-year-old grandson of French automotive tycoon Jean-Pierre Peugeot of Peugeot, was kidnapped from a playground at Saint-Cloud, near Paris. Eric was released three days later, in exchange for a ransom of $300,000.

== April 13, 1960 (Wednesday) ==
- The United States launched Transit I-B, the first successful navigation satellite, at 7:03 EST from Cape Canaveral. The Transit technology was eventually superseded by Global Positioning System satellites, which were aided by Rudolf E. Kálmán's development, later in the year, of the Kalman filter.
- The UK government cancelled the Blue Streak missile.

== April 14, 1960 (Thursday) ==
- East Germany's Communist SED completed "Socialist Spring in the Countryside" ("Socialistische Frühling in der Land") its collective farming project, to finish the creation of the Landwirtschaftliche Produktionsgenossenschaft (agricultural production cooperative). The "socialist spring" had been the seizure by the East German government of privately owned farms and businesses, prompting thousands of business owners and farm owners to flee to the West.
- Bye Bye Birdie, the first Broadway musical to acknowledge rock 'n roll as part of its score, opened at the Martin Beck Theatre, and introduced such songs as Put On A Happy Face. With music and lyrics by Charles Strouse and Lee Adams, the Tony Award winning musical featured Dick Van Dyke, Paul Lynde, Michael J. Pollard, Charles Nelson Reilly, Chita Rivera, Dick Gautier, and others.
- The first underwater launching of the Polaris missile took place. The unarmed weapon was fired from the ballistic submarine USS George Washington, off of the coast of California.
- The Montreal Canadiens defeated the Toronto Maple Leafs, 4 to 0, to win the National Hockey League's Stanley Cup, sweeping all the games to clinch the best-4-of-7 series.
- Sultan Alam Shah became the second Yang di-Pertuan Agong, the Malaysian head of state.
- Motown Record Corporation was incorporated in Michigan.

== April 15, 1960 (Friday) ==
- The Student Nonviolent Coordinating Committee (SNCC) was organized in Raleigh, North Carolina, by 300 students from 58 colleges, who assembled at the invitation of Ella Baker at Shaw University.
- Born: Philippe of Belgium, King of the Belgians since 2013; at Belvédère Castle in Laeken

== April 16, 1960 (Saturday) ==
- The Sino-Soviet split widened as the Chinese Communist Party journal Red Flag published the editorial Long Live Leninism, an assertion that began with the premise that the Soviet Union had, by pursuing peaceful change, deviated from Lenin's thesis that "so long as imperialism exists, war is inevitable".
- The "New Realism" artistic movement was founded by art critic Pierre Restany with the publication of his Manifeste des Nouveaux Réalistes.
- Born:
  - Rafael Benítez, Spanish-born soccer football team manager known for guiding Valencia CF, Liverpool F.C., Newcastle United, SSC Napoli and Inter Milan to league titles; in Madrid
  - Wahab Akbar, Filipino politician and Governor of Basilon Province, known for his "eye for an eye" policy against terroristm; in Lantawan, Basilan (d. 2007)

== April 17, 1960 (Sunday) ==
- The Russwood Park baseball stadium in Memphis, Tennessee, burned to the ground shortly after a game between the Chicago White Sox and the Cleveland Indians game.
- Died: Eddie Cochran, 21, American rock musician who wrote and recorded the classic "Summertime Blues", died from injuries received the previous day when he, his fiancée Sharon Sheeley, and his fellow musician, Gene Vincent, were involved in a taxi accident. The three Americans had been driving through the town of Chippenham in England, when their car blew a tyre and crashed into a lamp post. Cochran, who would be inducted into the Rock and Roll Hall of Fame in 1987, would have a posthumous hit with the ironically-titled "Three Steps to Heaven".

== April 18, 1960 (Monday) ==
- The Screen Actors Guild, led by future United States President Ronald Reagan, ended its strike against major movie studios.
- The European Convention on Extradition took effect, providing uniform rules for all member nations.
- Born:
  - J. Christopher Stevens, U.S Ambassador to Libya who was killed in the 2012 Benghazi attack on the U.S. consulate; in Grass Valley, California
  - Neo Rauch, German painter; in Leipzig

== April 19, 1960 (Tuesday) ==
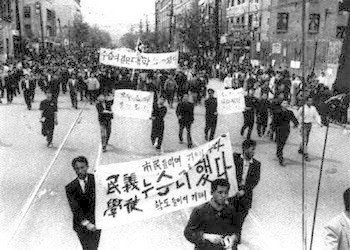
Seoul protesters

- More than 100,000 students in South Korea marched in Seoul in protest over election fraud committed by President Syngman Rhee in the voting of March 15, beginning the "April Revolution". Police fired into the crowds, killing 140 protesters.
- The crash of Lloyd Aereo Colombiano S.A. (LACSA) Flight 503 killed 37 of the 51 people on board during its landing at Bogotá in Colombia after a multi-stop flight that had originated in Miami. Only one crewmember and 13 passengers survived.
- China's Prime Minister Zhou Enlai was welcomed in New Delhi by India's Prime Minister Jawaharlal Nehru to discuss the countries' border dispute, but the talks ended without progress.
- The South West Africa People's Organization (SWAPO) was formed, with Sam Nujoma as its first president, eventually securing independence for Namibia.
- The People's Republic of China struck oil, five days after workers began drilling at Taching (Daqing).
- The first X-ray photograph of the Sun was taken, with a pinhole camera on an Aerobee rocket.
- The 64th Boston Marathon was won by Paavo Kotila of Finland in 2:20:54.
- Born: Gustavo Petro, 34th President of Colombia since 2022; in Ciénaga de Oro, Córdoba Department

== April 20, 1960 (Wednesday) ==
- Rebels led by General Jose Maria Castro León seized control of the Venezuelan state of Táchira and its capital, San Cristóbal, and attempted unsuccessfully to persuade other military garrisons to revolt against the government of President Rómulo Betancourt. The uprising was quickly put down.
- Elvis Presley returned to Hollywood for the first time since his return from military service in Germany, to begin filming G.I. Blues.
- The three-day "Manned Space Stations Symposium" began as a conference featuring leading aeronautical and aerospace scientists and engineers from across the United States, and was sponsored by the Institute of the Aeronautical Sciences, NASA, and the RAND Corporation sponsored a . This conference marked one of the focal points in American space station thinking up to that time.
- Born: Miguel Díaz-Canel, 3rd and current First Secretary of the Communist Party of Cuba; in Placetas, Villa Clara Province

== April 21, 1960 (Thursday) ==
- After a week in which 6,000 East Germans fled to West Berlin, several DDR police crossed the border and began searching luggage at railroad stations. West Berlin police arrested two of the DDR police, while others fled. The exodus of thousands came after the East German government "collectivized" private farms and businesses and directed landowners and shopkeepers to become employees of state-owned cooperatives.
- President Juscelino Kubitschek dedicated the city of Brasília, three years after he had directed construction to begin on a new capital city for Brazil. Located 600 miles (970 km) inland, the city was designed by architect Oscar Niemeyer and urban planner Lucio Costa at a cost of ten billion dollars.

== April 22, 1960 (Friday) ==
- The crash of a Belgian DC-4 airliner into a mountainside in Congo killed all 28 passengers and seven crew. The flight had originated in Brussels the night before, with a final destination of Lubumbashi (at the time, called Elisabethville) with stops at Rome, Cairo and Bunia. The plane descended for its approach to Bunia through low clouds and impacted a peak in the Virunga Mountains.
- France's President Charles De Gaulle was given an enthusiastic welcome by 200,000 people upon his arrival in Washington, D.C., on the fifth day of his tour of the Western Hemisphere. President De Gaulle spoke to a joint session of Congress on April 25, urging nuclear disarmament, and was cheered by more than a million people the next day at a ticker-tape parade in New York.
- Born:
  - Mart Laar, Prime Minister of Estonia from 1992 to 1994 and again from 1999 to 2002; in Viljandi
  - Gary Rhodes, English celebrity chef (d. 2019); in London

== April 23, 1960 (Saturday) ==
- Researcher Tim Dinsdale brought his 16 millimeter movie camera to capture what many believe to be the only film of the Loch Ness Monster.
- Born: Valerie Bertinelli, American TV actress known for One Day at a Time, as well as being a weight-loss spokesperson and a former wife of Eddie Van Halen; in Wilmington, Delaware

== April 24, 1960 (Sunday) ==
- When more than 100 black protesters marched on to a "whites only" beach in Biloxi, Mississippi, for a "wade-in" to force desegregation, they were attacked by several hundred white people, while Harrison County sheriff's deputies at the scene stood by. The violence then spilled over into the most violent riot in Mississippi history. A U.S. Department of Justice suit ended beach segregation the following month.
- One of the first widely publicized stories of hysterical strength happened in Tampa, Florida, when Mrs. Florence Rogers, a 123-pound (56 kg) woman, lifted one end of a 3,600-pound (1,600 kg) car that had fallen off of a jack and onto her 16-year-old son, Charles Trotter. Mrs. Rogers, an LPN, fractured several vertebrae in the process.
- A fraudulent parliamentary election in Laos resulted in a landslide victory for the ruling CDNI Party.
- Died: Max von Laue, 80, German physicist and Nobel Prize laureate, died 16 days after his car was struck by a motorcyclist.

== April 25, 1960 (Monday) ==
- The USS Triton (SSRN-586) completed the first submerged circumnavigation of the globe.
- A test program on the environmental-control-system training spacecraft for Project Mercury was completed by the McDonnell Corporation.

== April 26, 1960 (Tuesday) ==
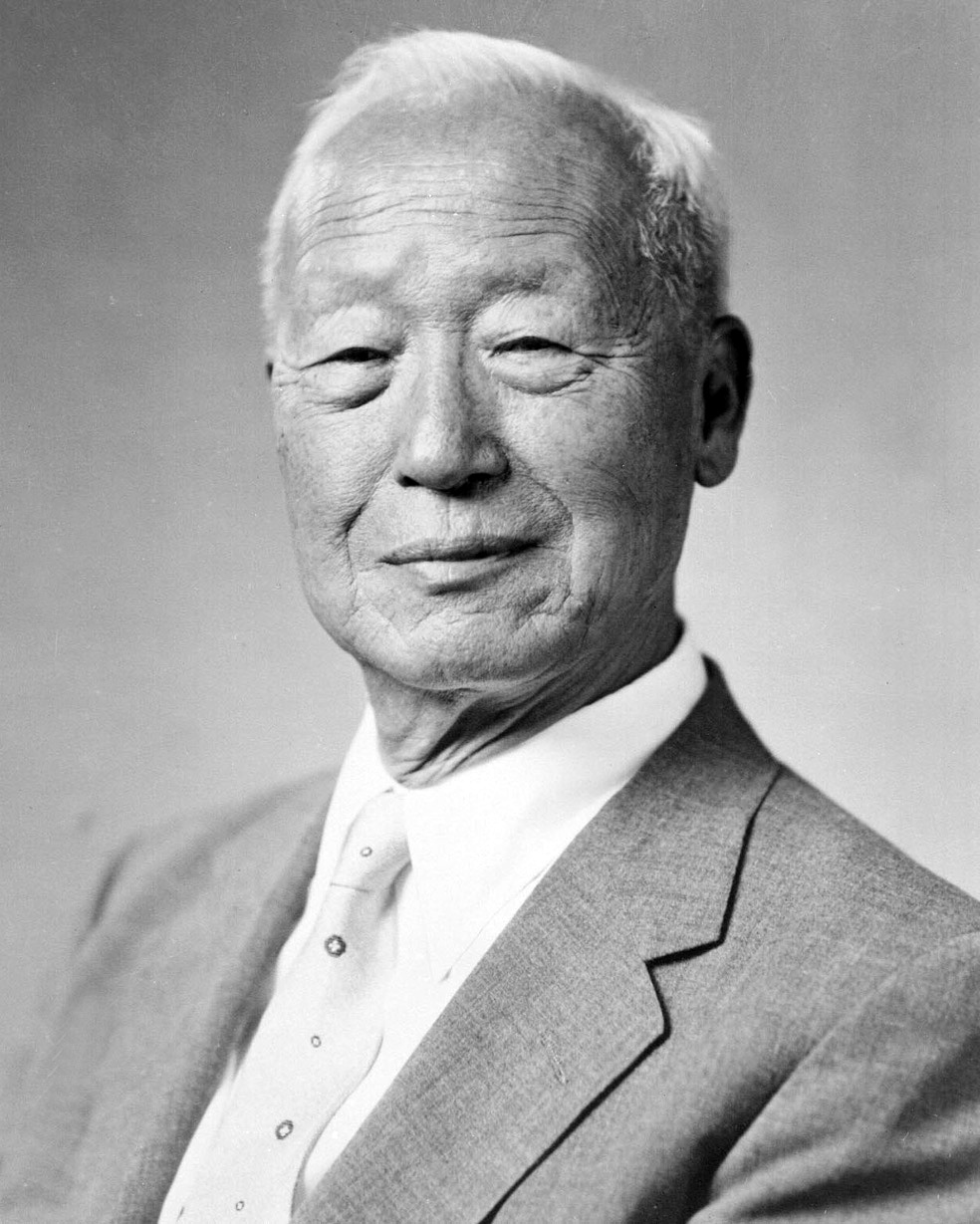
President Rhee

- Syngman Rhee resigned as President of South Korea after 12 years of dictatorial rule, after a week-long uprising in which 145 students had died. Rhee and his wife were flown out of the country by the United States, and he lived in exile in Hawaii until his death in 1965. Until a new President could be elected, Rhee was replaced in the interim by a former Mayor of Seoul, Heo Jeong.
- The "Manifesto of the Eighteen" was published in Saigon.
- Born: Affectionately, thoroughbred racehorse and one of only two female horses to earn more than half a million dollars in prize winnings. Between 1962 and 1965, she would win 18 major stakes races, and would later be inducted into the National Museum of Racing and Hall of Fame (d. 1979)
- Died: Amānullāh Khān, 67, King of Afghanistan from 1919 to 1929, died 31 years after his forced abdication.

== April 27, 1960 (Wednesday) ==
Togo

- The West African country of French Togoland, a UN trust territory, became independent, as the Togolese Republic was proclaimed at 12:10 a.m. local (and GMT) in Lomé. Sylvanus Olympio became the new nation's first President. The symbolic first raising of the new flag was confounded by tangled ropes and the problem was not resolved until later in the hour.
- Various gamma ray detectors were carried aboard Explorer XI on its orbital flight. These detectors found a directional flux of gamma radiation in space and thereby provided serious evidence against one formulation of the "steady state" cosmological theory.
- The Ghanaian constitutional referendum resulted in a vote in favour of replacing the constitutional monarchy with a republic led by a president.
- USS Tullibee (SSN-597), the first nuclear-powered electric-drive submarine, was launched from Groton, Connecticut.

== April 28, 1960 (Thursday) ==
- The construction of what would become Shea Stadium, at Flushing, Queens, was approved by New York City's Board of Estimate, 20–2, giving the proposed Continental League the chance to launch. The Continental League never played, but the stadium gave the National League the impetus to return to the city, with the New York Mets.
- Born:
  - Elena Kagan, American jurist, Associate Justice of the U.S. Supreme Court; in New York City
  - Walter Zenga, Italian footballer and football manager; in Milan
  - Ian Rankin, Scottish crime novelist; in Cardenden, Fife
- Died: Lee Ki-poong, former Vice-President of South Korea, died along with his wife and two sons as part of a suicide pact. Lee, and President Syngman Rhee, had resigned two days earlier in the wake of the April Revolution.

== April 29, 1960 (Friday) ==
- Agreements were concluded for all overseas Mercury tracking stations, as construction proceeded at Cape Canaveral, Bermuda, the Grand Canary Island, the Woomera and Muchea (both in Australia) at the demonstration site on Wallops Island, Virginia. The site of another station, at Guaymas in western Mexico had been surveyed, but construction not yet started.
- Italy's new government, led by Fernando Tambroni of the Christian Democrats, narrowly won a vote of confidence, 128–110, in the Italian Senate. Tambroni had quit on April 11, shortly after taking office.

== April 30, 1960 (Saturday) ==
- Thousands of Paraguayan rebels crossed the Paraná River, Paraguay's southern border with Argentina, seeking to overthrow the government of dictator Alfredo Stroessner.
- Born: David Miscavige, American Scientologist leader; in Philadelphia
