= Jari Porttila =

Finnish sports journalist (born 1960)

- Born: 2 February 1960 (age 66); Helsinki, Finland
- Other names: Mestari, Sporde
- Occupations: Sports journalist, broadcaster

Jari Porttila (born 2 February 1960 in Helsinki) is a Finnish sports journalist, columnist, and reporter for television channel MTV3. He has also been a commentator and sportsreader. Before MTV3 he worked for newspapers Uusi Suomi and Iltalehti.

From 1990s to 2000s Porttila worked as a sportsreader in Tulosruutu, a sports news program on MTV3, and occasionally as a live-by-live commentator. In 1999, he had a memorable interview at the sideline at the Finland vs. Turkey match in the UEFA Euro 2000 qualifying campaign. During the match, there was a streaker who held a Kurdish protest on the field. When the game was interrupted, Porttila interviewed the Turkish coach, Mustafa Denizli and asked "What do you think the next happen now?" which become a famous saying in Finnish media.

Nowadays, Porttila is mainly known for his columns, in which he speaks out in a high-spirited way about the events in the world of sports. He has many contacts in the inner circle of sports. He focuses usually on skiing, ski jumping, Nordic combined, Formula One, and ice hockey, but is able to commentate on almost everything in sports. Porttila has written six sports books about Finnish Olympic athletes. Most recently, he wrote the biography of Olympic champion Siiri Rantanen. Porttila is the editor-in-chief of maximusport.com and a commentator on the athletics diamond league at Cmore. He is also writing to Ilta-Sanomat.
