= Barbara Browne =

American bacteriologist

Barbara Browne (born Barbara Moulton, August 26, 1915 – May 12, 1997) was a bacteriologist who worked with the U.S. Food and Drug Administration to help revolutionize the medical drug industry.

== Early life and education ==
Barbara Browne was born under the name Barbara Moulton in Chicago, Illinois, whose father was Harold G. Moulton, an economics professor at the University of Chicago. Brown attended Smith College along with the University of Vienna, but finished getting her bachelor's degree at the University of Chicago. For two years after graduation at the university, Browne studied bacteriology and various infectious diseases. Like her father, Browne completed her master's at George Washington University in Washington, D.C., in 1940, then by 1944 received her medical degree.

== Career ==
Employed by the Food and Drug Administration in 1955 Browne saw the fraud within the administration. Fifteen years later Browne resigned from the FDA. She shifted her efforts towards creating better quality of drug approval. After testifying before the Kefauver Senate Subcommittee, the United States Congress modified the drug approval process. Browne worked with the Bureau of Deceptive Practices at the Federal Trade Commission as a medical officer in order to bring to light the ethical issues present within the Food and Drug Administration.

== Personal life ==
She then married E. Wayles Browne Jr., an economist.
